= Senator McCreesh =

Senator McCreesh may refer to:

- John McCreesh (1881–1959), Pennsylvania State Senate
- Thomas McCreesh (1928–2016), Pennsylvania State Senate
