= Joanna McClinton =

Speaker of the Pennsylvania House of Representatives since 2023

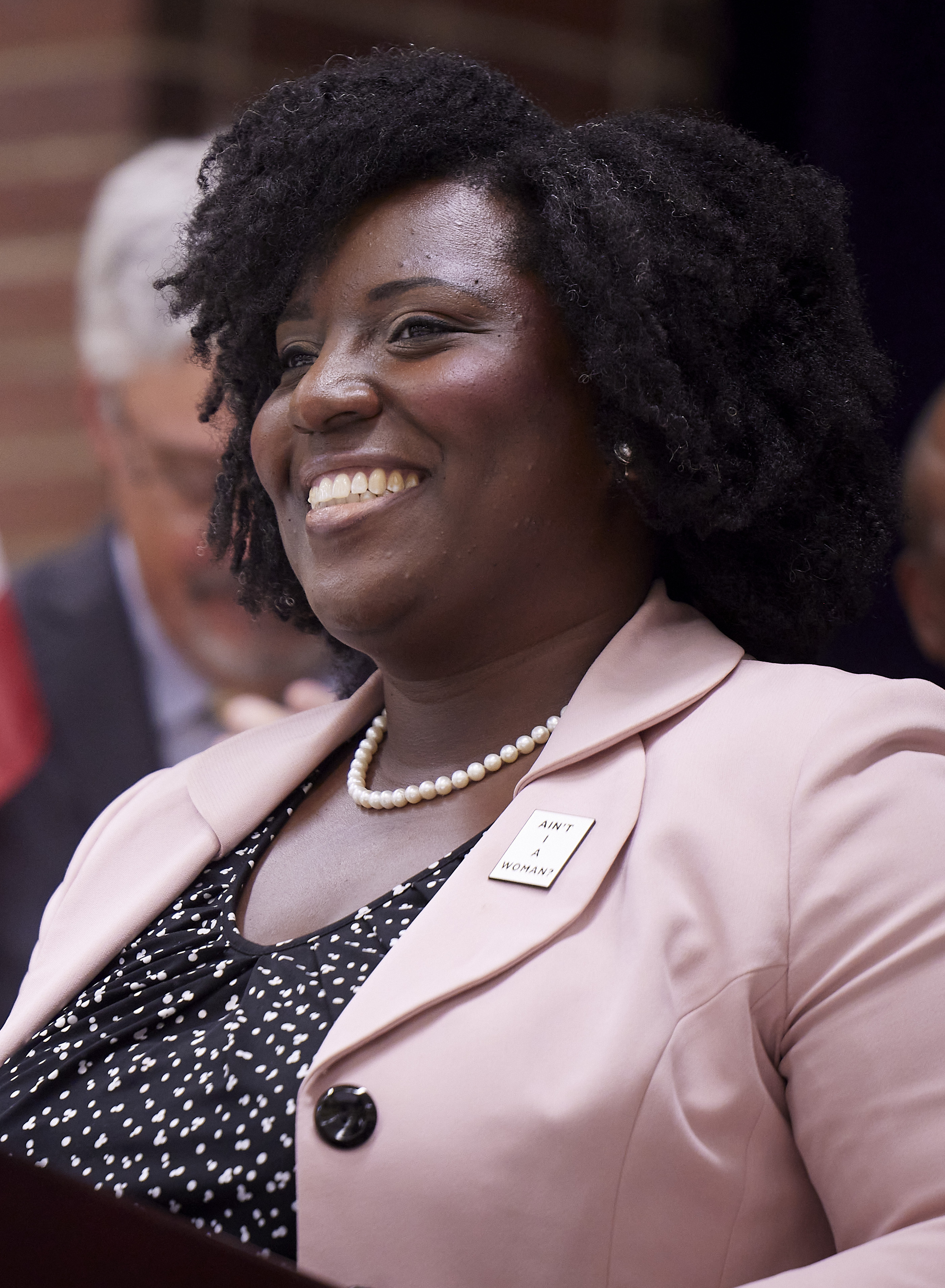
- McClinton in 2022

143rd Speaker of the Pennsylvania House of Representatives
- Incumbent
- Assumed office February 28, 2023
- Preceded by: Mark Rozzi
- Succeeded by
House positions
Majority Leader of the Pennsylvania House of Representatives
In office December 1, 2022 – February 28, 2023
Preceded by	Kerry Benninghoff
Succeeded by	Matthew Bradford
Minority Leader of the Pennsylvania House of Representatives
In office December 1, 2020 – December 1, 2022
Preceded by	Frank Dermody
Succeeded by	Bryan Cutler

Member of the Pennsylvania House of Representatives from the 191st district
- Incumbent
- Assumed office August 25, 2015
- Preceded by: Ronald G. Waters

Personal details
- Born: August 19, 1982 (age 44) Philadelphia, Pennsylvania, U.S.
- Party: Democratic
- Education: La Salle University (BA); Villanova University (JD)
- Website: Campaign website State House website

Joanna E. McClinton (born August 19, 1982) is an American politician from Pennsylvania currently serving as the 141st Speaker of the Pennsylvania House of Representatives since February 28, 2023. A member of the Democratic Party, she is the first woman to serve as Speaker.

She previously served as Majority Leader from December 1, 2022 to February 28, 2023 and Minority Leader from December 2020 to December 2022. She has served as the representative from the 191st district representing Delaware County and Philadelphia, Pennsylvania since 2015.

== Education and early career ==
McClinton was born and raised in Southwest Philadelphia. She said an internship with WDAS radio started her interest community engagement. McClinton received her B.A. in political science from La Salle University. She earned her J.D. from Villanova University School of Law, and while enrolled there interned at the Philadelphia District Attorney's Office as well as the Defender Association of Philadelphia. Upon graduation, McClinton went on to work for seven years as an assistant public defender. She was eventually named assistant chief of the East Zone. In 2013, McClinton was named Chief Counsel to State Senator Anthony Hardy Williams of the 8th district.

== Political career ==
McClinton started her first term in the state legislature after she won a special election for Pennsylvania House of Representatives in 2015. The special election was held following Ronald Waters' resignation on June 1, 2015 after he pled guilty to cash payments from lobbyists and sentenced to 23 months probation. She then went on to win reelection in 2016, running unopposed in the general election.

McClinton's policy proposals center around education reform, job creation, creating a state-funded indigent defense system, and reforming the criminal justice system. She proposed legislation to establish universal pre-K and reform the Pennsylvania's expungement system. As a public defender, much of McClinton's focus has been on reforming Pennsylvania's criminal justice system. She has proposed changing the indigent defense system from being funded by the city to being funded by the state, and connecting constituents with career placement resources. During the 2017–2018 legislative session McClinton will propose legislation that she co-sponsored to create a school-based drug substance abuse intervention program in Pennsylvania schools. This proposed legislation would require the Board of Education to work alongside the Pennsylvania Department of Drug and Alcohol Program to develop the appropriate curriculum guidelines and would require schools to implement the program into their health classes.

In 2018, she was elected to serve as Democratic Caucus Chair by members of the House Democratic Caucus. She was the first female and first African-American caucus chair.

In November 2020, she was elected to serve as the House Democratic Leader. She became Majority Leader in 2022.

=== Speaker of the Pennsylvania House of Representatives ===
On February 28, 2023, McClinton was elected Speaker of the Pennsylvania House of Representatives, becoming the first woman and second Black person (after K. Leroy Irvis) to hold the post.

As Speaker, McClinton oversaw the bipartisan passage of a law that made breast cancer screenings free to Pennsylvanians. It was signed into law by Governor Shapiro in May 2023. Additionally, she also oversaw the passage of multiple gun control bills, including a bill implementing red flag laws and another that seeks to close the gun show loophole through an expansion of background checks.

== Political positions ==
=== Democracy and voting rights ===
McClinton supports protecting voting rights for all. In January 2022, McClinton introduced the K. Leroy Irvis Voting Rights Act (HB 2090), named after former Speaker of the Pennsylvania House of Representatives K. Leroy Irvis. The legislation sought to make voting more accessible through same-day voter registration and expanding early voting.

== Honors and awards ==
McClinton has received numerous awards relating to her community service. McClinton has appeared on the Philadelphia and Pennsylvania Forty under 40. She appeared on FunTime magazine's women of distinction list in 2018. She received the Philadelphia Barrister Association's "Outstanding Lawyer of the Year" award in 2018.

Pennsylvania House of Representatives
Preceded by Ronald Waters	Member of the Pennsylvania House of Representatives from the 191st district 2015–present	Incumbent
Preceded by Frank Dermody	Minority Leader of the Pennsylvania House of Representatives; 2020–2023	Succeeded by Bryan Cutler
Preceded by Bryan Cutler	Majority Leader of the Pennsylvania House of Representatives; 2023	Succeeded by Matthew Bradford
Political offices
Preceded by Mark Rozzi	Speaker of the Pennsylvania House of Representatives; 2023–present	Incumbent
