= McCreesh =

McCreesh is a surname. Notable people with the surname include:

- Geoff McCreesh (born 1970), Irish boxer
- John McCreesh (1881–1959), American politician
- Paul McCreesh (born 1960), English conductor
- Raymond McCreesh (1957–1981), Provisional Irish Republican Army member
- Thomas McCreesh (1928–2016), American politician
