= Ohio's 7th congressional district =

U.S. House district for Ohio

Coordinates: 40°28′52″N 82°23′35″W

- Interactive map of district boundaries
- Representative: Max Miller; R–Rocky River
- Population (2025): 787,682
- Median household income: $86,485
- Ethnicity: 86.4% White; 3.7% Hispanic; 3.5% Two or more races; 3.0% Asian; 2.9% Black; 0.4% other
- Cook PVI: R+5

Ohio's 7th congressional district is represented by Max Miller. It is currently located in the northeastern section of the state, including southern and western Cuyahoga County, all of Medina and Wayne Counties, and a sliver of northern Holmes County.

== Recent election results from statewide races ==
=== 2023-2027 boundaries ===
Year	Office	Results
2008	President	McCain 50% - 49%
2012	President	Romney 52% - 48%
2016	President	Trump 54% - 42%
2016	Senate	Portman 61% - 34%
2018	Senate	Brown 52% - 48%
2018	Governor	DeWine 52% - 45%
2018	Secretary of State	LaRose 51% - 46%
2018	Treasurer	Sprague 55% - 45%
2018	Auditor	Faber 51% - 45%
2018	Attorney General	Yost 52% - 48%
2020	President	Trump 54% - 45%
2022	Senate	Vance 52% - 48%
2022	Governor	DeWine 63% - 37%
2022	Secretary of State	LaRose 59% - 40%
2022	Treasurer	Sprague 59% - 41%
2022	Auditor	Faber 59% - 41%
2022	Attorney General	Yost 60% - 40%
2024	President	Trump 55% - 44%
2024	Senate	Moreno 49% - 48%

=== 2027–2033 boundaries ===
Year	Office	Results
2008	President	McCain 49.6% - 48.9%
2012	President	Romney 52% - 48%
2016	President	Trump 54% - 42%
2016	Senate	Portman 61% - 34%
2018	Senate	Brown 52% - 48%
2018	Governor	DeWine 52% - 45%
2018	Attorney General	Yost 52% - 48%
2020	President	Trump 54% - 45%
2022	Senate	Vance 52% - 48%
2022	Governor	DeWine 63% - 37%
2022	Secretary of State	LaRose 60% - 39%
2022	Treasurer	Sprague 59% - 41%
2022	Auditor	Faber 59% - 41%
2022	Attorney General	Yost 60% - 40%
2024	President	Trump 55% - 44%
2024	Senate	Moreno 50% - 47%

== Composition ==
For the 118th and successive Congresses (based on redistricting following the 2020 census), the district contains all or portions of the following counties, townships, and municipalities:

Cuyahoga County (28)

Bay Village, Bentleyville, Berea, Brecksville, Broadview Heights, Brooklyn, Brooklyn Heights, Brook Park, Chagrin Falls (part; also 11th), Fairview Park, Glenwillow, Independence, Linndale, Middleburg Heights, North Olmsted, North Royalton, Oakwood, Olmsted Falls, Olmsted Township, Parma, Parma Heights, Rocky River, Seven Hills, Solon, Strongsville, Valley View, Walton Hills, Westlake

Holmes County (7)

Holmesville, Loudonville, Nashville, Prairie Township, Ripley Township, Salt Creek Township (part; also 12th), Washington Township

Medina County (28)

All 28 township and municipalities

Wayne County (32)

All 32 township and municipalities

== List of members representing the district ==
Member	Party	Years	Cong ress	Electoral history	Counties represented
District established March 4, 1823
Samuel Finley Vinton (Gallipolis)	Adams-Clay; Democratic-Republican	March 4, 1823 – March 3, 1825	18th 19th 20th 21st 22nd	Elected in 1822. Re-elected in 1824. Re-elected in 1826. Re-elected in 1828. Re-elected in 1830. Redistricted to the 6th district.	
Samuel Finley Vinton (Gallipolis)	Anti-Jacksonian	March 4, 1825 – March 3, 1833	18th 19th 20th 21st 22nd	Elected in 1822. Re-elected in 1824. Re-elected in 1826. Re-elected in 1828. Re-elected in 1830. Redistricted to the 6th district.	
William Allen (Chillicothe)	Jacksonian	March 4, 1833 – March 3, 1835	23rd	Elected in 1832. Lost re-election.	
William K. Bond (Chillicothe)	Anti-Jacksonian	March 4, 1835 – March 3, 1837	24th 25th 26th	Elected in 1834. Re-elected in 1836. Re-elected in 1838. Retired.	
William K. Bond (Chillicothe)	Whig	March 4, 1837 – March 3, 1841	24th 25th 26th	Elected in 1834. Re-elected in 1836. Re-elected in 1838. Retired.	
William Russell (Portsmouth)	Whig	March 4, 1841 – March 3, 1843	27th	Elected in 1840. [data missing]	
Joseph J. McDowell (Hillsboro)	Democratic	March 4, 1843 – March 3, 1847	28th 29th	Elected in 1843. Re-elected in 1844. [data missing]	
Jonathan D. Morris (Batavia)	Democratic	March 4, 1847 – March 3, 1851	30th 31st	Elected in 1846 after Rep-elect Thomas L. Hamer died before start of term. Re-elected in 1848. [data missing]	
Nelson Barrere (Hillsboro)	Whig	March 4, 1851 – March 3, 1853	32nd	Elected in 1850. Lost re-election.	
Aaron Harlan (Yellow Springs)	Whig	March 4, 1853 – March 3, 1855	33rd 34th 35th	Elected in 1852. Re-elected in 1854. Re-elected in 1856. Lost re-election.	
Aaron Harlan (Yellow Springs)	Anti-Nebraska	March 4, 1855 – March 3, 1857	33rd 34th 35th	Elected in 1852. Re-elected in 1854. Re-elected in 1856. Lost re-election.	
Aaron Harlan (Yellow Springs)	Republican	March 4, 1857 – March 3, 1859	33rd 34th 35th	Elected in 1852. Re-elected in 1854. Re-elected in 1856. Lost re-election.	
Thomas Corwin (Lebanon)	Republican	March 4, 1859 – March 12, 1861	36th 37th	Elected in 1858. Re-elected in 1860. Resigned to become U.S. Minister to Mexico.	
Vacant		March 12, 1861 – July 4, 1861	37th		
Richard A. Harrison (London)	Union	July 4, 1861 – March 3, 1863	37th	Elected to finish Corwin's term. [data missing]	
Samuel S. Cox (Columbus)	Democratic	March 4, 1863 – March 3, 1865	38th	Redistricted from the 12th district and re-elected in 1862. [data missing]	
Samuel Shellabarger (Springfield)	Republican	March 4, 1865 – March 3, 1869	39th 40th	Elected in 1864. Re-elected in 1866. [data missing]	
James J. Winans (Xenia)	Republican	March 4, 1869 – March 3, 1871	41st	Elected in 1868. [data missing]	
Samuel Shellabarger (Springfield)	Republican	March 4, 1871 – March 3, 1873	42nd	Elected in 1870. [data missing]	
Lawrence T. Neal (Chillicothe)	Democratic	March 4, 1873 – March 3, 1877	43rd 44th	Elected in 1872. Re-elected in 1874. [data missing]	
Henry L. Dickey (Greenfield)	Democratic	March 4, 1877 – March 3, 1879	45th	Elected in 1876. Redistricted to the 11th district.	
Frank H. Hurd (Toledo)	Democratic	March 4, 1879 – March 3, 1881	46th	Elected in 1878. [data missing]	
John P. Leedom (West Union)	Democratic	March 4, 1881 – March 3, 1883	47th	Elected in 1880. [data missing]	
Henry Lee Morey (Hamilton)	Republican	March 4, 1883 – June 20, 1884	48th	Lost contested election	
James E. Campbell (Hamilton)	Democratic	June 20, 1884 – March 3, 1885	48th	Won contested election. Redistricted to the 3rd district.	
George E. Seney (Tiffin)	Democratic	March 4, 1885 – March 3, 1887	49th	Redistricted from the 5th district and re-elected in 1884. Redistricted to the 5th district.	
James E. Campbell (Hamilton)	Democratic	March 4, 1887 – March 3, 1889	50th	Redistricted from the 3rd district and re-elected in 1886. [data missing]	
Henry Lee Morey (Hamilton)	Republican	March 4, 1889 – March 3, 1891	51st	Elected in 1888. [data missing]	
William E. Haynes (Fremont)	Democratic	March 4, 1891 – March 3, 1893	52nd	Redistricted from the 10th district and re-elected in 1890. [data missing]	
George W. Wilson (London)	Republican	March 4, 1893 – March 3, 1897	53rd 54th	Elected in 1892. Re-elected in 1894. [data missing]	
Walter L. Weaver (Springfield)	Republican	March 4, 1897 – March 3, 1901	55th 56th	Elected in 1896. Re-elected in 1898. [data missing]	
Thomas B. Kyle (Troy)	Republican	March 4, 1901 – March 3, 1905	57th 58th	Elected in 1900. Re-elected in 1902. [data missing]	
J. Warren Keifer (Springfield)	Republican	March 4, 1905 – March 3, 1911	59th 60th 61st	Elected in 1904. Re-elected in 1906. Re-elected in 1908. [data missing]	
James D. Post (Washington Courthouse)	Democratic	March 4, 1911 – March 3, 1915	62nd 63rd	Elected in 1910. Re-elected in 1912. [data missing]	
Simeon D. Fess (Yellow Springs)	Republican	March 4, 1915 – March 3, 1923	64th 65th 66th 67th	Redistricted from the 6th district and re-elected in 1914. Re-elected in 1916. Re-elected in 1918. Re-elected in 1920. Retired to run for U.S. senator.	
Charles Brand (Urbana)	Republican	March 4, 1923 – March 3, 1933	68th 69th 70th 71st 72nd	Elected in 1922. Re-elected in 1924. Re-elected in 1926. Re-elected in 1928. Re-elected in 1930. Retired.	
Leroy T. Marshall (Xenia)	Republican	March 4, 1933 – January 3, 1937	73rd 74th	Elected in 1932. Re-elected in 1934. Lost re-election.	
Arthur W. Aleshire (Springfield)	Democratic	January 3, 1937 – January 3, 1939	75th	Elected in 1936. Lost re-election.	
Clarence J. Brown (Blanchester)	Republican	January 3, 1939 – August 23, 1965	76th 77th 78th 79th 80th 81st 82nd 83rd 84th 85th 86th 87th 88th 89th	Elected in 1938. Re-elected in 1940. Re-elected in 1942. Re-elected in 1944. Re-elected in 1946. Re-elected in 1948. Re-elected in 1950. Re-elected in 1952. Re-elected in 1954. Re-elected in 1956. Re-elected in 1958. Re-elected in 1960. Re-elected in 1962. Re-elected in 1964. Died.	
Vacant		August 23, 1965 – November 2, 1965	89th		
Bud Brown (Urbana)	Republican	November 2, 1965 – January 3, 1983	89th 90th 91st 92nd 93rd 94th 95th 96th 97th	Elected to finish his father's term. Re-elected in 1966. Re-elected in 1968. Re-elected in 1970. Re-elected in 1972. Re-elected in 1974. Re-elected in 1976. Re-elected in 1978. Re-elected in 1980. Retired to run for governor.	
Mike DeWine (Cedarville)	Republican	January 3, 1983 – January 3, 1991	98th 99th 100th 101st	Elected in 1982. Re-elected in 1984. Re-elected in 1986. Re-elected in 1988. Retired to run for Lieutenant Governor of Ohio.	
Dave Hobson (Springfield)	Republican	January 3, 1991 – January 3, 2009	102nd 103rd 104th 105th 106th 107th 108th 109th 110th	Elected in 1990. Re-elected in 1992. Re-elected in 1994. Re-elected in 1996. Re-elected in 1998. Re-elected in 2000. Re-elected in 2002. Re-elected in 2004. Re-elected in 2006. Retired.	
Dave Hobson (Springfield)	Republican	January 3, 1991 – January 3, 2009	102nd 103rd 104th 105th 106th 107th 108th 109th 110th	Elected in 1990. Re-elected in 1992. Re-elected in 1994. Re-elected in 1996. Re-elected in 1998. Re-elected in 2000. Re-elected in 2002. Re-elected in 2004. Re-elected in 2006. Retired.	2003–2013
Steve Austria (Beavercreek)	Republican	January 3, 2009 – January 3, 2013	111th 112th	Elected in 2008. Re-elected in 2010. Retired.	2003–2013
Bob Gibbs (Lakeville)	Republican	January 3, 2013 – January 3, 2023	113th 114th 115th 116th 117th	Redistricted from the 18th district and re-elected in 2012. Re-elected in 2014. Re-elected in 2016. Re-elected in 2018. Re-elected in 2020; Retired.	2013–2023
Max Miller (Rocky River)	Republican	January 3, 2023 – present	118th 119th	Elected in 2022. Re-elected in 2024. Lost re-election.	2023–2027
Brian Poindexter (Brook Park)	Democratic	Assuming office on January 3, 2027		Elected in 2026.	2027–

== Recent election results ==
The following chart shows historic election results. Bold type indicates victor. Italic type indicates incumbent.

Year	Democratic	Republican	Other
1920	Paul F. Dye: 47,196	**Simeon D. Fess**: 73,794	
1922	Charles B. Zimmerman: 38,522	Charles Brand: 53,182	
1924	C. K. Wolf: 34,709	**Charles Brand**: 61,557	
1926	Harry E. Rice: 22,314	**Charles Brand**: 45,699	
1928	Harry E. Rice: 34,323	**Charles Brand**: 75,753	
1930	John L. Zimmerman Jr.: 35,663	**Charles Brand**: 50,595	
1932	Aaron J. Halloran: 57,715	Leroy T. Marshall: 65,064	
1934	C. W. Rich: 43,226	**Leroy T. Marshall**: 46,453	
1936	Arthur W. Aleshire: 68,456	Leroy T. Marshall: 67,454	
1938	Arthur W. Aleshire: 50,163	Clarence J. Brown: 68,185	
1940	J. Fuller Trump: 59,667	**Clarence J. Brown**: 83,415	
1942	George H. Smith: 23,384	**Clarence J. Brown**: 52,270	
1944	John L. Cashim: 52,403	**Clarence J. Brown**: 84,770	Carl H. Ehl: 211
1946	Carl H. Ehl: 29,824	**Clarence J. Brown**: 63,390	
1948		**Clarence J. Brown**: 71,737	
1950	Ben J. Goldman: 35,818	**Clarence J. Brown**: 77,660	
1952		**Clarence J. Brown**: 98,354	
1954	G. Louis Wren: 35,504	**Clarence J. Brown**: 62,821	
1956	Joseph A. Sullivan: 47,220	**Clarence J. Brown**: 91,439	
1958	Joseph A. Sullivan: 48,994	**Clarence J. Brown**: 75,085	
1960	Joseph A. Sullivan: 55,451	**Clarence J. Brown**: 105,026	
1962	Robert A. Riley: 39,908	**Clarence J. Brown**: 83,680	
1964	Jerry R. Graham: 70,857	**Bud Brown***: 93,022	
1966		**Bud Brown**: 81,225	
1968	Robert E. Cecile: 55,386	**Bud Brown**: 97,581	
1970	Joseph D. Lewis: 37,294	**Bud Brown**: 84,448	
1972		**Bud Brown**: 112,350	Dorothy Franke: 40,945
1974	Patrick L. Nelson: 34,828	**Bud Brown**: 73,503	Dorothy Franke: 13,088
1976	Dorothy Franke: 54,755	**Bud Brown**: 101,027	
1978		**Bud Brown**: 92,507	
1980	Donald Hollister: 38,952	**Bud Brown**: 124,137	
1982	Roger D. Tackett: 65,543	Mike DeWine: 87,842	John B. Winer (L): 2,761
1984	Donald E. Scott: 40,621	**Mike DeWine**: 147,885	Others: 4,352
1986		**Mike DeWine**: 119,238	
1988	Jack Schira: 50,423	**Mike DeWine**: 142,597	
1990	Jack Schira: 59,349	Dave Hobson: 97,123	
1992	Clifford S. Heskett: 66,237	**Dave Hobson**: 164,195	
1994		**Dave Hobson**: 140,124	
1996	Richard K. Blain: 61,419	**Dave Hobson**: 158,087	Dawn Marie Johnson (N): 13,478
1998	Donald E. Minor Jr.: 49,780	**Dave Hobson**: 120,765	James A. Schrader (L): 9,146
2000	Donald E. Minor Jr.: 60,755	**Dave Hobson**: 163,646	John Mitchel: 13,983; Jack D. Null (L): 3,802
2002	Kara Anastasio: 45,568	**Dave Hobson**: 113,252	Frank Doden (G): 8,812
2004	Kara Anastasio: 97,972	**Dave Hobson**: 182,621	
2006	William R. Conner: 85,202	**Dave Hobson**: 133,112	
2008	Sharen Neuhardt: 113,099	Steve Austria: 159,265	
2010	William R. Conner: 70,400	**Steve Austria**: 135,721	John Anderson (L): 9,381; David Easton (C): 2,811
2012	Joyce Healy-Abrams: 137,708	**Bob Gibbs**: 178,104	
2014		**Bob Gibbs**: 143,959	
2016	Roy Rich: 89,638	**Bob Gibbs**: 198,221	Dan Phillip: 21,694
2018	Ken Harbaugh: 107,536	**Bob Gibbs**: 153,117	
2020	Quentin Potter: 102,271	**Bob Gibbs**: 236,607	Brandon Lape (L): 11,671
2022	Matthew Diemer: 135,485	**Max Miller**: 168,002	Others: 86
2024	Matthew Diemer: 144,607	**Max Miller**: 204,459	Dennis Kucinich (I): 51,264

== See also ==
- Ohio's congressional districts
- List of United States congressional districts
