= Agnes Scanlon =

American politician (1923–2018)

Agnes M. Scanlon

Member of the Pennsylvania House of Representatives from the 177th district
- In office 1977–1978
- Preceded by: Joseph A. Sullivan
- Succeeded by: Gerald F. McMonagle

Personal details
- Born: December 22, 1923 Springfield, Massachusetts, U.S.
- Died: October 3, 2018 (aged 94) Philadelphia, Pennsylvania, U.S.
- Party: Democratic
- Spouse: Joseph Scanlon
- Children: Three children

Agnes M. Scanlon (December 22, 1923 – October 3, 2018) was a Democratic member of the Pennsylvania House of Representatives.

== Formative years and family ==
Born as Agnes M. Ruddock in Springfield, Massachusetts, on December 22, 1923, Scanlon graduated from the High School of Commerce in Springfield, the Springfield Vocational School, the Philadelphia Flore Academy of Beauty Culture, and the Berlitz School of Languages.

She and her husband, Pennsylvania Senator Joseph J. Scanlon, were the parents of three children, the grandparents of eight grandchildren and the great-grandparents of six great-grandchildren.

Her husband preceded her in death. Still a sitting member of the Pennsylvania State Senate, he died on September 13, 1970, at Temple University Hospital in Philadelphia while undergoing treatment for diabetes. He was buried at the Holy Sepulchre Cemetery in Cheltenham Township, Pennsylvania.

== Career ==
Employed during her early adult years as a beautician, she and her husband, Joe, owned and operated Joe Scanlon's Tavern at the corner of Allegheny Avenue and G Street in Philadelphia's Kensington neighborhood.

Hired as an administrative assistant for the Register of Wills office in Philadelphia, Agnes Scanlon later worked as an administrative assistant for the Philadelphia Parking Authority.

Executive committee leader for the Democratic Party's 33rd Ward from 1970 to 1974, she ran an unsuccessful campaign for the Philadelphia City Council in 1971.

She was then elected as a Democrat to the Pennsylvania House of Representatives for the 1977 term, during which she worked to increase state funding for Pennsylvania schools, but was an unsuccessful candidate for reelection, losing the opportunity to serve for the 1979 term by less than three hundred votes.

== Death ==
Scanlon died in Philadelphia on October 3, 2018.
