= Kenyatta Johnson =

Pennsylvania politician (born 1973)

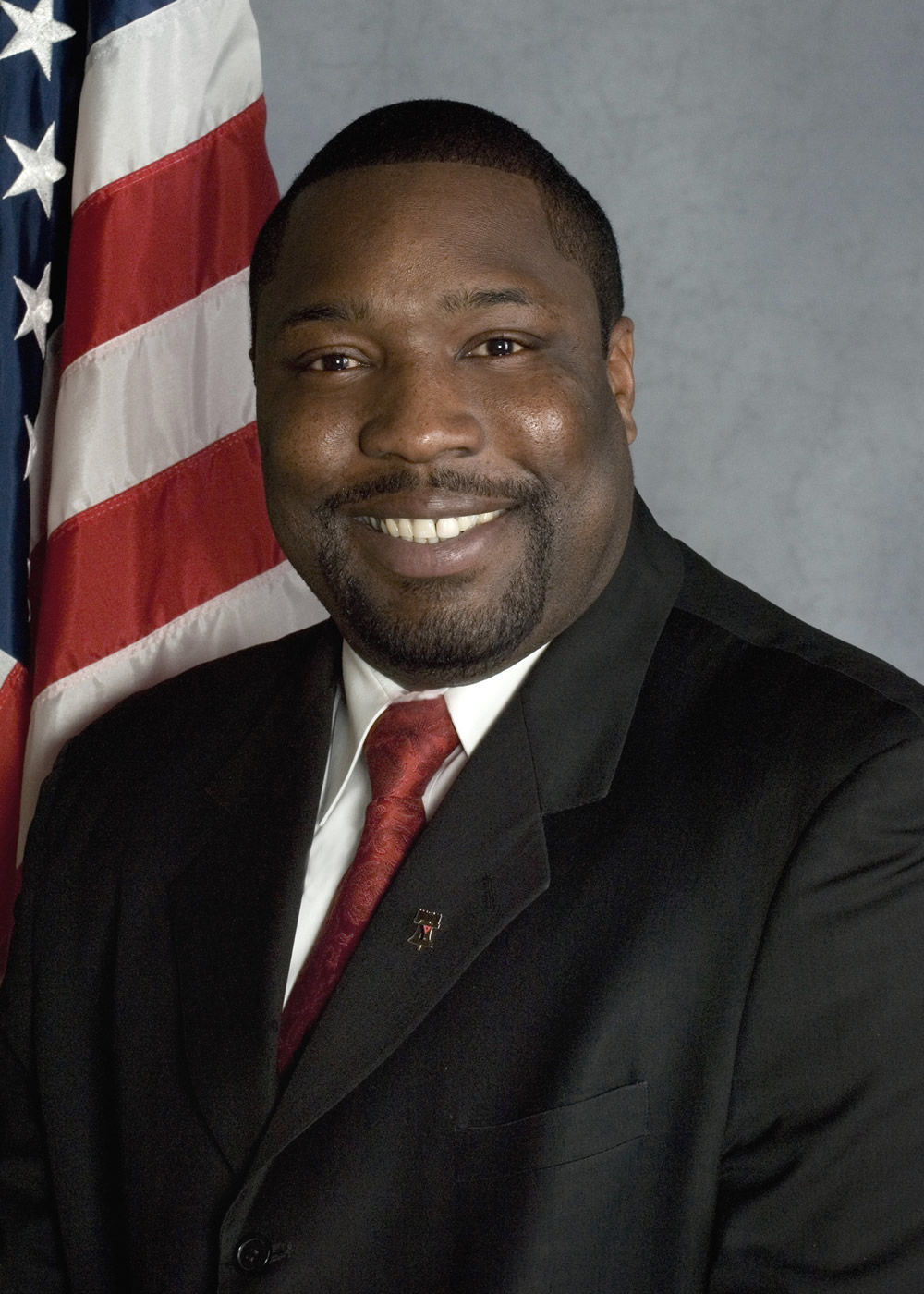
- Johnson in 2010

President of the Philadelphia City Council
- Incumbent
- Assumed office January 2, 2024
- Preceded by: Darrell L. Clarke

Member of the Philadelphia City Council from the 2nd District
- Incumbent
- Assumed office January 2, 2012
- Preceded by: Anna Verna

Member of the Pennsylvania House of Representatives from the 186th district
- In office January 6, 2009 – January 2, 2012
- Preceded by: Harold James
- Succeeded by: Harold James

Personal details
- Born: October 30, 1973 (age 53) Philadelphia, Pennsylvania, U.S.
- Party: Democratic
- Spouse: Dawn Chavous (m. 2012)
- Education: Mansfield University of Pennsylvania (BA); University of Pennsylvania (MGA)
- Website: Official website

Kenyatta J. Johnson (born October 30, 1973) is an American politician who has served as president of the Philadelphia City Council since 2024. A member of the Democratic Party, he has represented the second district on the Council since 2012. His district includes parts of Center City, South, and Southwest Philadelphia.

Johnson previously served as a member of the Pennsylvania House of Representatives, representing the 186th district from 2009 to 2012.

== Early life and education ==
Johnson was born in Philadelphia, Pennsylvania, on October 30, 1973, to Gregory White and Yvonne Martin. He attended Edward Bok High School, graduating in 1991. He graduated from Mansfield University of Pennsylvania with a Bachelor of Arts in criminal justice in 1996 and from the Fels Institute of Government, University of Pennsylvania, earning a Master of Government Administration in 2001.

== Politics ==
Johnson founded Peace Not Guns after the murder of his cousin. He has worked since 1998 to end gun violence through education and programs created to give children an alternative to the streets. His activism led to a successful run for the Pennsylvania House of Representatives. He served as State Representative for the 186th Legislative District from 2009 until 2012 when he took the oath of office for City Council. He was a senate staffer for six years for State Senator Anthony H. Williams before running for the House of Representatives.

Johnson is a former volunteer for AmeriCorps, the national service organization. He was a founding staff member of City Year, an AmeriCorps organization that aims to build advocacy through service.

Johnson's 2015 re-election campaign was "the most drawn-out and negative race" primary election of that election year. He defeated real estate developer Ori Feibush.

Johnson was elected president of the Philadelphia City Council on January 2, 2024, succeeding Darrell L. Clarke, who had served as president since 2012.

== Federal indictment ==
In an interview on January 28, 2020, with The Philadelphia Inquirer, Johnson announced that he and his wife, political consultant Dawn Chavous, expected federal prosecutors to announce charges against them. Johnson and his lawyer said they believed the grand jury indictment would focus on the relationships among the councilman’s City Hall office, Chavous's consulting firm, and Universal Companies, a South Philadelphia community development nonprofit and charter-school operator founded by the music producer Kenny Gamble.

On January 29, 2020, federal prosecutors brought a 22-count indictment against Johnson and charged him and associates, to include his wife, and two nonprofit executives, with racketeering, wire fraud, tax fraud, and other crimes. The indictment accused Johnson of allegedly abusing his “councilmanic prerogative” to influence zoning decisions in his district for his own profit.

The case was declared a mistrial in April 2022 after the jury deadlocked; the government retried the case and Johnson was acquitted.

== Personal life ==
In 2012, Johnson married political consultant Dawn Chavous, who worked as chief of staff for State Senator Anthony H. Williams and as campaign manager for his 2010 gubernatorial run.

== See also ==
- List of members of Philadelphia City Council since 1952
