= Joseph F. Smith (Pennsylvania politician) =

American politician

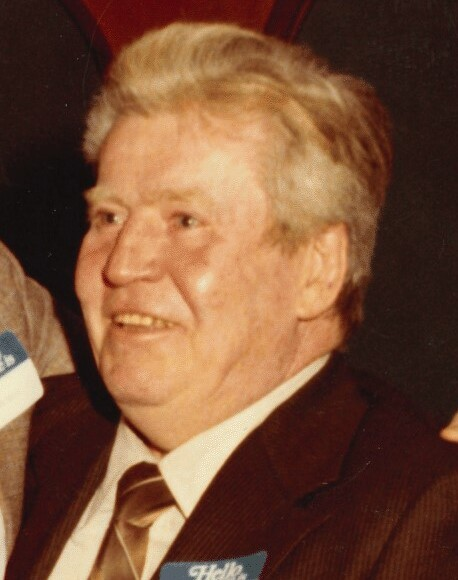
- Joseph F. Smith at a Philadelphia Democratic City Committee fundraiser in November 1984.

Member of the U.S. House of Representatives from Pennsylvania's 3rd district
- In office July 21, 1981 – January 3, 1983
- Preceded by: Raymond Lederer
- Succeeded by: Robert Borski

Chair of the Philadelphia Democratic City Committee
- In office April 14, 1983 – June 16, 1986
- Preceded by: Edgar Campbell (acting)^{[a]}
- Succeeded by: Bob Brady

Member of the Pennsylvania State Senate from the 4th district
- In office January 5, 1971 – July 21, 1981
- Preceded by: Joseph J. Scanlon
- Succeeded by: Joe Rocks

Personal details
- Born: January 24, 1920 Philadelphia, Pennsylvania
- Died: May 14, 1999 (aged 79) Philadelphia, Pennsylvania
- Party: Democratic
- a.Smith successfully ran for the post against Campbell, who had been serving as the city party's acting chair since the resignation of David Glancey, effective March 10, 1983.

Joseph Francis Smith (January 24, 1920 – May 14, 1999), was an American politician from Pennsylvania who served as a Democratic member of the United States House of Representatives for Pennsylvania's 3rd congressional district from 1981 to 1983. He served as Chairman of the Philadelphia Democratic City Committee from 1983 to 1986 and as a member of the Pennsylvania State Senate for the 4th district from 1971 to 1981.

== Early life and education ==
Smith was born in Philadelphia, Pennsylvania and attended St. Anne's Parochial School. He graduated from Northeast Catholic High School in Philadelphia in 1939. He attended St. Joseph's College in Philadelphia from 1940 to 1942. Smith was a sergeant and Purple Heart recipient in the United States Army during World War II from 1942 to 1945.

== Career ==
After leaving the military, Smith became active in local politics, serving first as Ward Chair for James A. Byrne between 1965 and 1970. He became Byrne's Administrative Assistant during that time. He then served in the Pennsylvania State Senate from 1971 until 1981, and eventually became Chairman of the Committee on Appropriations.

He won election in 1981 as a Democrat to the 97th Congress through a special election to fill the vacancy caused by the resignation of United States Representative Raymond Lederer due to the ABSCAM sting. Smith lost the Democratic primary in the special election to David B. Glancey, but then ran as a Republican, with the blessing of the GOP, in the general election and won. He promised during his campaign that he would caucus with the Democrats if elected.

After redistricting in 1982, Smith narrowly lost the Democratic primary against fellow congressman Tom Foglietta. He went on to become Democratic City Chairman in Philadelphia between 1983 and 1986. Smith also served as the 31st Ward Leader from 1982-1988 and as a committeeman for more than three decades.

== Legacy ==
In honor of Smith's years of service to his community, the United States Postal Service facility located at 1602 Frankford Avenue in Philadelphia ("Kensington Station") was renamed as the Joseph F. Smith Post Office Building.

== Personal life ==
He was married to Regina Bukowski-Smith, also of the Port Richmond section in Philadelphia. They had one daughter, Regina.

U.S. House of Representatives
Preceded by Raymond Lederer	Member of the U.S. House of Representatives from Pennsylvania's 3rd congressional district 1981–1983	Succeeded by Robert Borski
Pennsylvania State Senate
Preceded by Joseph Scanlon	Member of the Pennsylvania Senate for the 4th District; 1971–1980	Succeeded by Joe Rocks
Party political offices
Preceded by Edgar Campbell (acting)	Chairman of the Philadelphia Democratic Party; 1983–1986	Succeeded by Bob Brady
