= Pennsylvania House of Representatives, District 177 =

American legislative district

Pennsylvania's 177th State House of Representatives district
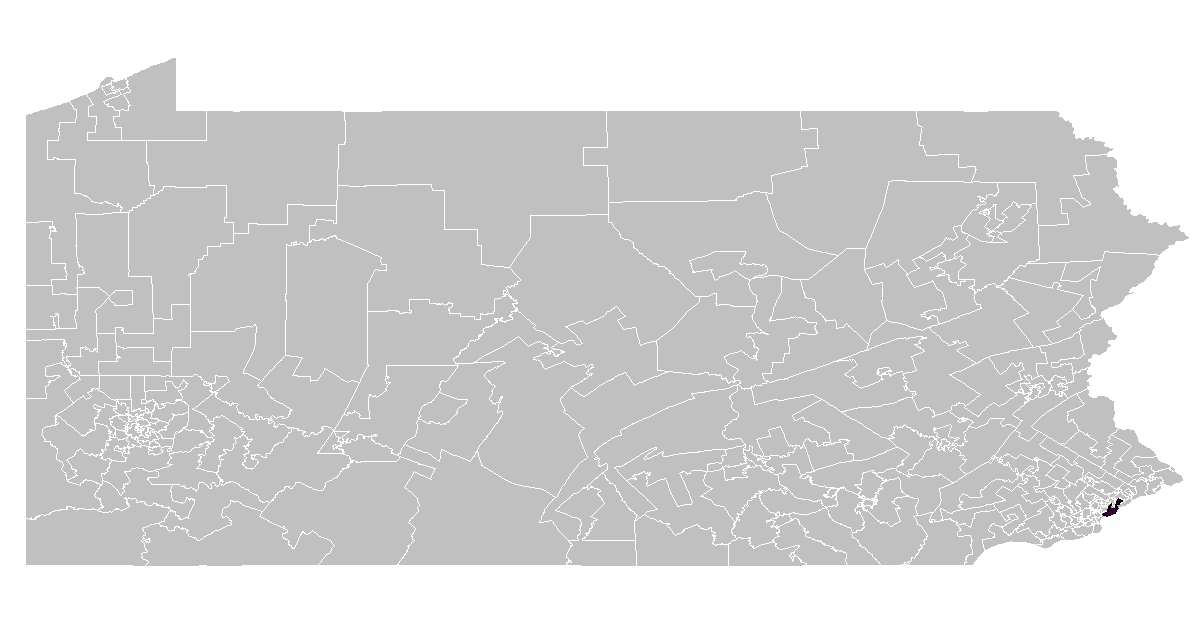
Representative
Joseph C. Hohenstein; D–Philadelphia

The 177th Pennsylvania House of Representatives District is located in Philadelphia County and includes the following areas:

- Ward 23 [PART, Divisions 01, 03, 04, 08, 09, 13 and 14]
- Ward 25 [PART, Divisions 01, 02, 03, 04, 05, 06, 07, 08, 10, 11, 12, 22 and 23]
- Ward 31 [PART, Divisions 06, 15, 16, 17, 18 and 19]
- Ward 41 [PART, Divisions 05 and 07]
- Ward 45 [PART, Divisions 01, 02, 03, 04, 05, 06, 07, 12, 15, 18, 20, 22, 23, 24 and 25]
- Ward 55 [PART, Divisions 01, 02, 03, 06, 08, 11, 12, 18, 19, 20, 21, 22, 23, 24, 25, 27 and 29]
- Ward 64 [PART, Divisions 02, 04, 06, 10, 11, 12, 13, 14, 16, 17 and 18]

== Representatives ==
Representative	Party	Years	District home	Note
Prior to 1969, seats were apportioned by county.
Joseph A. Sullivan	Democrat	1969 – 1976		
Agnes M. Scanlon	Democratic	1977 – 1978		
Gerald F. McMonagle	Democratic	1979 – 1984		
John J. Taylor	Republican	1985 – 2018		
Joseph Hohenstein	Democrat	2019 – present		Incumbent
