= Paul McKinney (politician) =

American politician (1923–1995)

Member of the Pennsylvania Senate from the 8th district
- In office January 7, 1975 – November 30, 1982
- Preceded by: Thomas McCreesh
- Succeeded by: Hardy Williams

Personal details
- Born: April 16, 1923 Albany, Georgia, U.S.
- Died: June 28, 1995 (aged 72) West Philadelphia, Pennsylvania, U.S.
- Party: Democratic
- Spouse: Bessie Grayson
- Children: Marcella, Gloria, Robert (Bobby), Paula, Diane, Gwen, Elaine and Vernell
- Occupation: Business Owner

Paul McKinney (April 16, 1923 – June 28, 1995) was an American politician who served as a Democratic member of the Pennsylvania State Senate for the 8th district from 1975 to 1982.

== Early life and education ==
McKinney was born in 1923 in Albany, Georgia. In 1941 he moved to Darby, Pennsylvania and served in the U.S. Merchant Marines during and after World War II. He moved to Philadelphia, Pennsylvania in the late 1940s and attended Palmer Business College.

== Business career ==
McKinney owned several business, his first being a restaurant and catering business with his wife Bessie. In the 1960s he owned and operated a television sales and repair shop. In 1966 he became one of Philadelphia's first African American U.S. Postal Service independent contractors.

== Political career ==
McKinney served as a Democratic Party Committeeman and Ward Chairman of West Philadelphia's 60th Ward for a number of years. In 1974 he was elected to the Pennsylvania Senate for the 8th district and served from 1975 to 1982.

== Personal life ==
In 1949, he married Bessie Grayson and together had five daughters. One of his daughters, Diane McKinney-Whetstone, became an award-winning author and faculty member of the University of Pennsylvania's creative writing program.
