= Clarence J. Brown =

American politician (1893–1965)

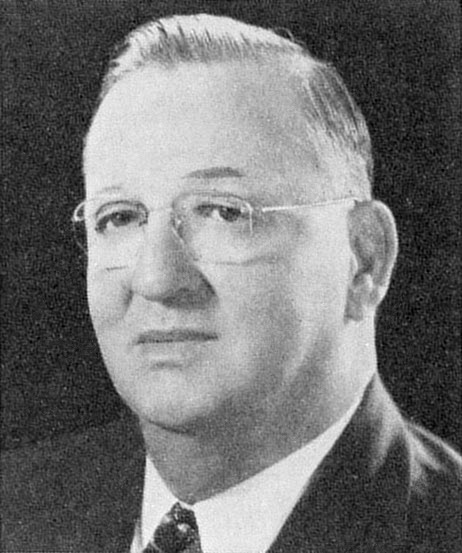
- Brown in 1953

Member of the U.S. House of Representatives from Ohio's 7th district
- In office January 3, 1939 – August 23, 1965
- Preceded by: Arthur W. Aleshire
- Succeeded by: Bud Brown

36th Lieutenant Governor of Ohio
- In office January 13, 1919 – January 8, 1923
- Governor: James M. Cox; Harry L. Davis
- Preceded by: Earl D. Bloom
- Succeeded by: Earl D. Bloom

36th Ohio Secretary of State
- In office January 10, 1927 – January 9, 1933
- Governor: A. Victor Donahey; Myers Y. Cooper; George White
- Preceded by: Thad H. Brown
- Succeeded by: George S. Myers

Personal details
- Born: Clarence James Brown; July 14, 1893 Blanchester, Ohio, U.S.
- Died: August 23, 1965 (aged 72) Bethesda, Maryland, U.S.
- Resting place: I.O.O.F. Cemetery, Blanchester, Ohio
- Party: Republican
- Spouse: Ethel McKinney
- Children: 3, including Bud
- Relatives: Clancy Brown (grandson)
- Education: Washington and Lee University School of Law

Clarence James Brown Sr. (July 14, 1893 – August 23, 1965) was an American politician; he represented Ohio as a Republican in the United States House of Representatives from 1939 until his death in Bethesda, Maryland, in 1965. Long representing conservative views, near the end of his life, he helped gain House passage of the Voting Rights Act of 1965, which he voted for to provide enforcement of the right to vote for all citizens, while also voting in favor of the Civil Rights Act of 1957, 1960, and 1964.

As president of Brown Publishing Company from 1920, he created a huge media company that lasted for 90 years. In 1918, at age 25, Brown was elected as the 36th lieutenant governor of Ohio, the youngest man to gain that post.

== Life and career ==
Brown was born in Blanchester, Clinton County, Ohio or West Union, Clermont County, Ohio, the son of Owen and Ellen Barerre (née McCoppin) Brown. He attended the Blanchester public schools, and then attended law school at Washington and Lee University, in Lexington, Virginia, from 1913 to 1915.

On his twenty-first birthday, Brown married Ethel McKinney. He worked as state statistician in 1915 and 1916 in the Ohio Secretary of State's office.

Brown began newspaper work in Blanchester in 1917, where he published several country newspapers. He became president of the Brown Publishing Company in Blanchester, and also owned and operated several large farms in the Blanchester area. He directed Brown Publishing for the rest of his life.

== Political career ==
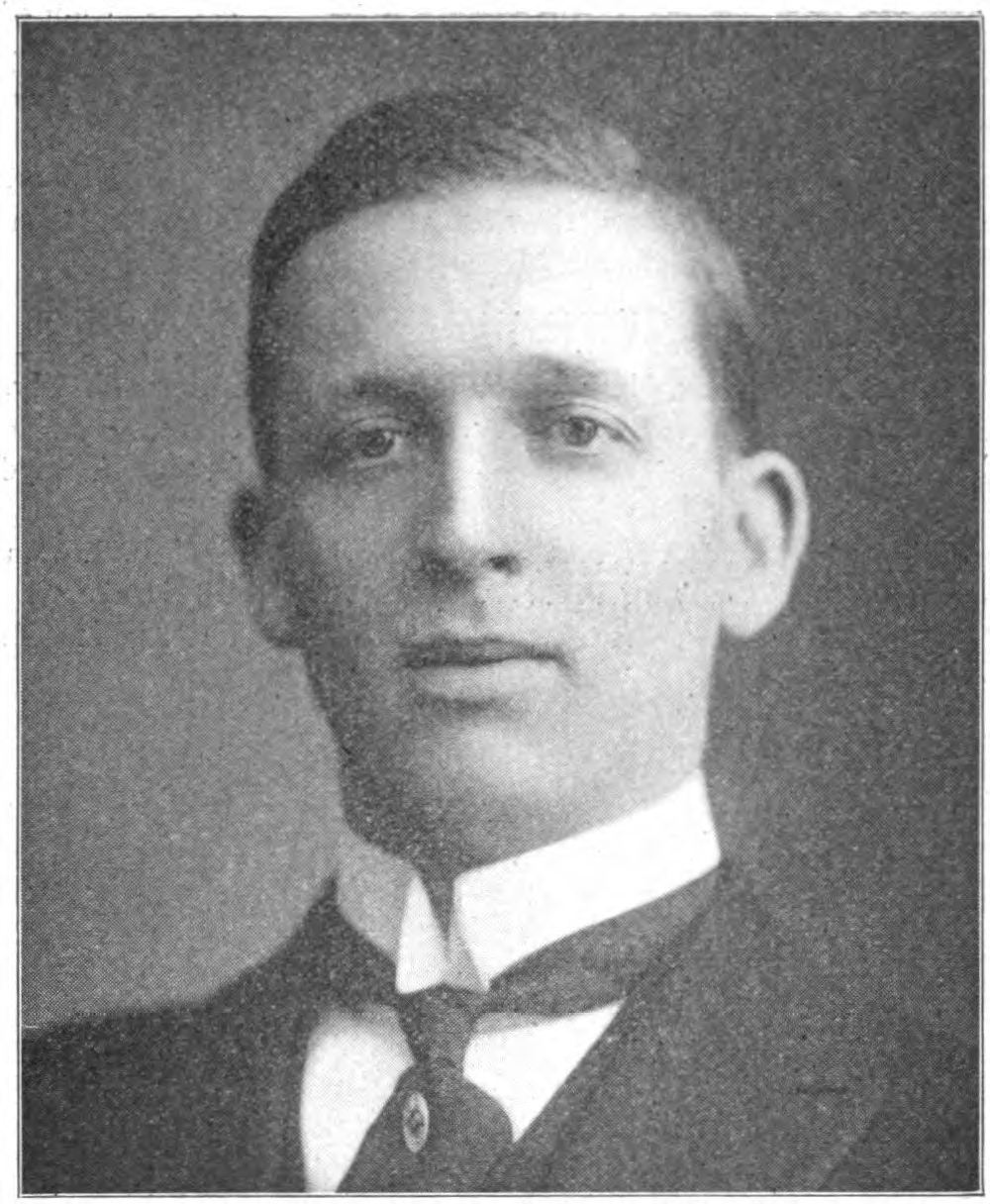
Brown as lieutenant governor of Ohio 1919–1923.

In 1918, at 25, Brown was elected as the 36th Lieutenant Governor of Ohio, serving from 1919 to 1923; he was the youngest man ever to hold the office. In 1926, he was elected Ohio Secretary of State and served from 1927 to 1933.

In 1921, at the height of the Ku Klux Klan's power in Ohio, Brown supported federal civil rights legislation to stop the lynching of African-Americans. In 1938, prior to his first election as U.S. representative, he was one of only 67 (of 870) candidates for U.S. House along with only 8 (out of 96) sitting Senators to pledge support to the NAACP for federal anti-lynching legislation, the legislative precursor to modern civil rights legislation. In 1940, during debate of the anti-lynching bill he stated:

We hear much of the struggle throughout the world to maintain democracy. From the lips of those who oppose this measure comes... at other times... the loudest protestations of belief in democracy. Let me say, here and now, that if democracy is to continue to live throughout the world, and here in our beloved America, those of us who have the ability and power to do so must see to it that the full rights of the weak and defenseless are safeguarded against the violence and the intolerance of the strong and the mighty.

In 1947, during floor debate involving Adam Clayton Powell Jr. (D–NY) and John E. Rankin (D–MS), Brown forced a rule change from Speaker Joseph W. Martin Jr. (R–MA) to prohibit racially offensive language from being used on the House floor.

Brown twice ran for governor of Ohio. In 1932, he lost the primary. In 1934, he won the Republican nomination but lost the general election. Brown was a delegate to the Republican National Conventions in 1936, 1940, 1944 and 1948 and a member of the Republican National Committee from 1944.

Brown was elected in 1938 as a Republican to the Seventy-sixth and to the thirteen succeeding Congresses, serving from January 3, 1939, until his death in 1965. While in Congress, he was chairman of the Select Committee on Newsprint in the Eightieth Congress; he was a personal friend of Democrat Speaker of the House Sam Rayburn of Texas.

In the 1930s and 1940s, Brown staunchly opposed President Franklin D. Roosevelt's New Deal policies to expand the federal bureaucracy. He also opposed expanding U.S. foreign military entanglements until the attack on Pearl Harbor. However, in March 1941 he voted in favor of providing increased military aid to the United Kingdom during that country's war against Nazi Germany. Following World War II, Brown warned against the continuation and expansion of foreign aid programs that were meant to be temporary. When Harry S. Truman became president, Brown opposed his Fair Deal, viewing it as corrupt cronyism through the expansion of federal bureaucracy.

Brown cosponsored legislation to create the Hoover Commission to study and reform the federal government and served on the commission, formally the Commission on the Organization of the Executive Branch of Government.

By the 1950s, Brown was the ranking minority member of the important Rules Committee in Congress. In the 1960s, he worked with its chairman, the Democrat Howard W. Smith of Virginia, to block expansive federal legislation sought by Presidents John F. Kennedy and Lyndon B. Johnson. Smith was a senior member of the Southern Bloc, which was established by white Democrats at the turn of the 20th century, when the former Confederate States disfranchised blacks. However, near the end of his life, Brown convinced the segregationist Smith to allow landmark civil rights legislation to reach the House floor for a vote.

He checked out of the hospital to help shepherd the Voting Rights Act of 1965 through Smith's Rules Committee, and he contributed to the achievements of the Civil rights movement.

Brown died from uremic poisoning due to kidney failure at Bethesda Naval Hospital, Bethesda, Maryland on August 23, 1965. He is buried in the I.O.O.F. Cemetery, Blanchester, Ohio.

Brown was a member of the Masons, K. of P., I.O.O.F., Moose, and M.W.A.

Brown and his wife Ethel had three children — Betty, Dorothy and Clarence J. "Bud" Brown Jr.

His son, Bud, won the special election in 1965 to fill his father's seat in Congress. His grandson is Clancy Brown, an actor. He is not related to the film director of the same name.

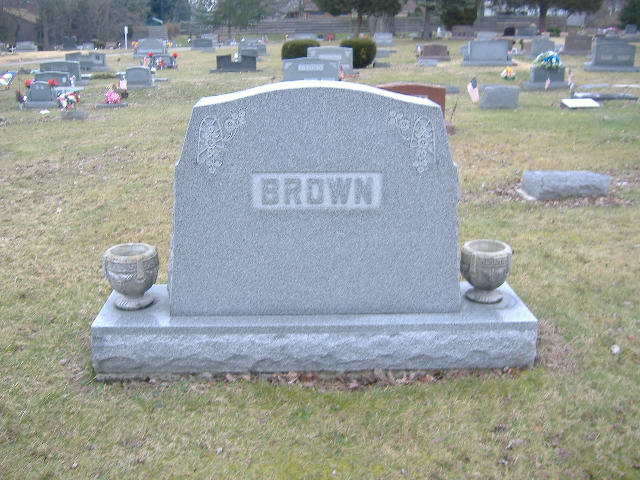
Brown family headstone at I.O.O.F. Cemetery in Blanchester, Ohio.

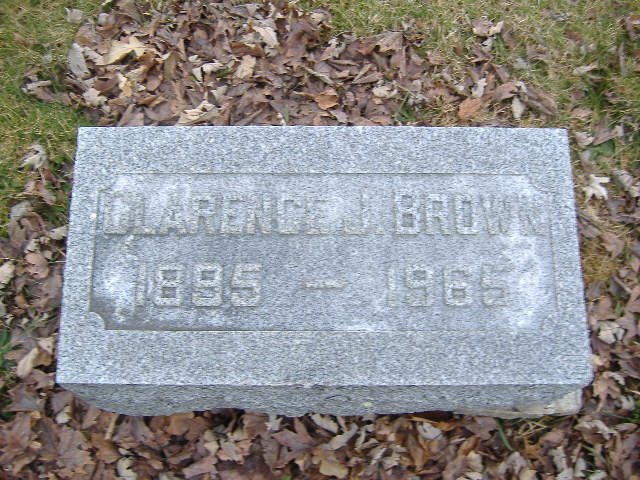
Gravemarker of Clarence J. Brown.

== See also ==
- List of United States representatives from Ohio
- List of members of the United States Congress who died in office (1950–1999)

== Notes ==
Political offices
Preceded by Earl D. Bloom	Lieutenant Governor of Ohio; 1919-1923	Succeeded by Earl D. Bloom
Legal offices
Preceded by Thad H. Brown	Ohio Secretary of State; 1927-1933	Succeeded by George S. Myers
Party political offices
Preceded by David S. Ingalls	Republican Party nominee for Governor of Ohio; 1934	Succeeded by John W. Bricker
