= Joseph Scanlon =

American politician

Joseph J. Scanlon

Member of the Pennsylvania Senate from the 4th district
- In office January 7, 1969 – September 13, 1970
- Preceded by: Thomas McCreesh
- Succeeded by: Joseph F. Smith
- Constituency: Part of Philadelphia

Personal details
- Born: April 3, 1924
- Died: September 13, 1970 (aged 46)
- Resting place: Holy Sepulchre Cemetery, Cheltenham Township, Pennsylvania, U.S.
- Spouse: Agnes M. (Ruddock) Scanlon
- Children: Three children

Joseph J. Scanlon (April 3, 1924 – September 13, 1970) was an American politician from Pennsylvania who served as a Democratic member of the Pennsylvania State Senate for the 4th district from 1969 to 1970.

== Biography ==
He graduated from Northeast Catholic High School in Philadelphia and attended Temple University. His father, Joseph A. Scanlon, was a member of the Pennsylvania House of Representatives for the Philadelphia County district from 1935 to 1952.

He and his wife, Agnes M. (Ruddock) Scanlon, were the parents of three children, the grandparents of eight grandchildren and the great-grandparents of six great-grandchildren. His wife was also a member of the Pennsylvania House of Representatives.

== Death and interment ==
Scanlon died in office in 1970 at Temple University Hospital while undergoing treatment for diabetes. He is interred at the Holy Sepulchre Cemetery in Cheltenham Township, Pennsylvania.
