= Gerald McMonagle =

American politician

Gerald F. McMonagle

Member of the Pennsylvania House of Representatives from the 177th district
- In office 1979–1984
- Preceded by: Agnes Scanlon
- Succeeded by: John J. Taylor

Personal details
- Born: May 19, 1936 (age 90) Philadelphia, Pennsylvania, United States
- Party: Democratic

Gerald F. McMonagle (born May 19, 1936) is a former Democratic member of the Pennsylvania House of Representatives.
