= McKinney and Associates =

McKinney & Associates
- Founded: 1990
- Headquarters: Washington, DC
- Website: www.mckpr.com

McKinney & Associates Public Relations (McKPR) was founded in 1990 with a commitment to practicing "public relations with a conscience." For the past 22 years, McKPR has become the go-to firm for advocacy, philanthropic and government clients, including the Robert Wood Johnson Foundation, NAACP Legal Defense and Educational Fund, Inc., Amnesty International USA and United States Department of Agriculture.

== About ==
The firm was co-founded in 1990 by Gwen McKinney and Leila McDowell as McKinney & McDowell Associates, making it the first woman and African American-owned strategic communication firm in Washington, DC. Today, Gwen McKinney solely leads McKinney & Associates.

MsKPR is a public relations firm that has worked with local, national, and international organization in public policy and social advocacy. The firm's work has included public relations, journalism, marketing, strategic planning, crisis communication, grassroots advocacy, and digital media. It has also developed communication campaign aimed at audiences including African Americans, Hispanic, Asian Americans, and women.

Past and current clients include:

- Amnesty International USA
- Asian American Justice Center
- Department of Homeland Security
- National Association for the Advancement of Colored People (NAACP)
- National Coalition to Abolish the Death Penalty
- National Institutes of Health
- National Public Radio (NPR)
- Robert Wood Johnson Foundation
- United States Department of Agriculture
- Unnatural Causes: Is Inequality Making Us Sick? (film)

== Campaigns ==
Amnesty International, "Ban the Belt" Campaign. Amnesty had released a report on stun technology (electroshock weapons) a few years before the 1999 USA Campaign that generated scant public attention. At the heart of the issue was the stun belt, increasingly becoming a tool of choice by the criminal justice system. Because of the temptation for abuse and misuse of this weapon, Amnesty viewed the stun belt as a tool of torture. Building upon the relationship with Muhammad Ali, Amnesty seized the opportunity to win a celebrity endorser to assist in a public call to ban the use of the stun belt. A poster (for worldwide distribution) and an ad were prepared for the New York Times. This was accompanied by a public service announcement and a video news release which, guided by McKinney & Associates provided a new wave of media coverage for the USA Campaign.

NAACP, "Stand for Freedom" Campaign The NAACP approached McKinney & Associates in 2011 to help launch the Stand for Freedom campaign. The centerpiece for the launch was a rally at the United Nations on December 10, marking International Human Rights Day, and the release of a report documenting the vote-blocking tactics of opponents. Working in close collaboration with NAACP senior leadership and communications staff, McKinney employed a multi-tiered strategy to support NAACP's goal to mobilize one million new voters. The campaign launch was an ambitious six-week sprint that involved envisioning a communications strategy, devising a multi-faceted message platform, generating media attention, producing communication collateral, and crafting a final report with qualitative and quantitative assessments on project outcomes.

PBS: Unnatural Causes ... Is Inequality Making Us Sick? The award-winning PBS series Unnatural Causes: Is Inequality Making Us Sick? was produced and distributed in 2008 by California Newsreel. Newsreel approached McKPR with a need to popularize the concepts in the series and to expand the public engagement beyond the relatively small and well-informed PBS audience. The firm led a team of communications consultants to roll out a six-month campaign that included messaging, collateral development and intensive publicity to support the PBS broadcast. McKPR was instrumental in shepherding relationships with Newsreel partners and stakeholders, and the firm helped plan and execute several screenings and panel discussions.

== Significance ==
Gwen McKinney, daughter of former Pennsylvania State Senator Paul McKinney, was a nationally syndicated reporter for the Philadelphia Tribune and the press secretary for Eleanor Holmes Norton during her 1990 campaign for United States Congress. Some of McKPR's earliest projects included work with the anti-apartheid movement and promotion of the then new South African government under President Nelson Mandela, National Rainbow Coalition, National Organization for Women and the governments of Haiti, Angola and Namibia.
