= Arthur W. Aleshire =

American politician (1900–1940)

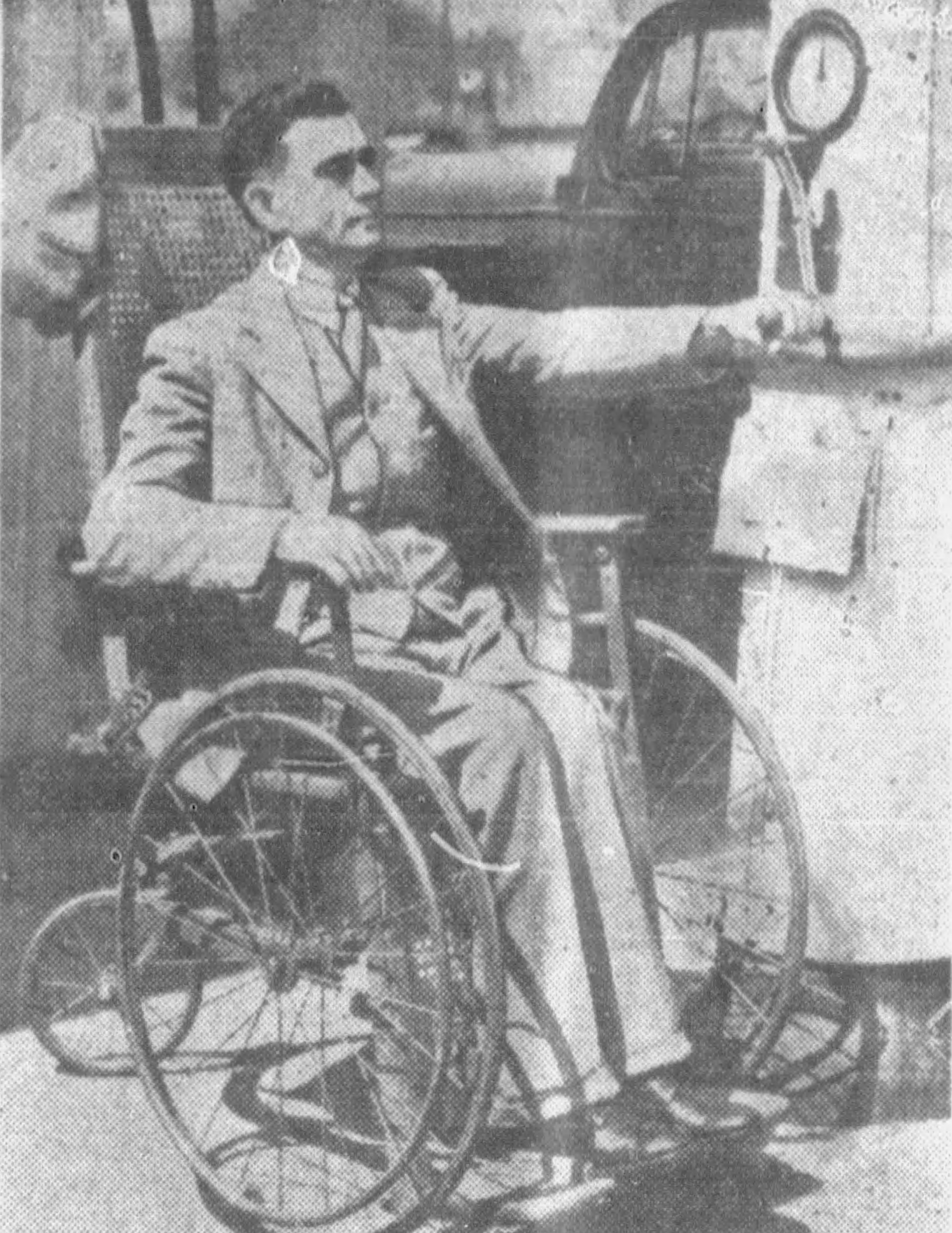
- Aleshire operating his filling station, 1936

Member of the U.S. House of Representatives from Ohio's 7th district
- In office January 3, 1937 – January 3, 1939
- Preceded by: Leroy T. Marshall
- Succeeded by: Clarence J. Brown

Personal details
- Born: Arthur William Aleshire; February 15, 1900 Luray, Virginia, U.S.
- Died: March 11, 1940 (aged 40) Springfield, Ohio, U.S.
- Resting place: Ferncliff Cemetery
- Party: Democratic
- Spouse: Myrtle Marsh (m. 1922)
- Children: 1
- Parents: William Aleshire (father); Ada Painter (mother)
- Occupation: Filling station operator; grocery store operator; politician

Arthur William Aleshire (February 15, 1900 – March 11, 1940) was an American politician serving as a U.S. representative from Ohio for one term from 1937 to 1939.

== Early life and career ==
Born near Luray, Virginia, Aleshire attended the rural schools. He moved to Clark County, Ohio, in 1912 with his parents, who settled on a farm near Springfield. He was employed by a railway express company in 1921 and 1922.

He engaged in dairy farming near Springfield, Ohio, in 1922 and 1923. He married Myrtle Marsh in 1922, and they had one son, Melvin.

=== Accident ===
Due to an accident in 1923, he lost the use of his legs and operated a filling station and grocery store in a wheelchair until his election to Congress.

== Congress ==
Aleshire was elected as a Democrat to the Seventy-fifth Congress (January 3, 1937 – January 3, 1939). He was an unsuccessful candidate for reelection in 1938 to the Seventy-sixth Congress. He resumed his former business pursuits near Springfield, Ohio.

== Death ==
He died in Springfield, Ohio, March 11, 1940. He was interred in Ferncliff Cemetery.

== Sources ==
- United States Congress. "Arthur W. Aleshire (id: A000088)". Biographical Directory of the United States Congress.
- Official Congressional Directory. 1938.

U.S. House of Representatives
Preceded by Leroy T. Marshall	Member of the U.S. House of Representatives from Ohio's 7th congressional district 1937–1939	Succeeded by Clarence J. Brown
