= Ronald Waters =

American politician

Member of the Pennsylvania House of Representatives from the 191st district
- In office May 18, 1999 – June 1, 2015
- Preceded by: Anthony Hardy Williams
- Succeeded by: Joanna E. McClinton

Personal details
- Party: Democratic

Ronald Waters is a Democratic politician and former member of the Pennsylvania House of Representatives, where he represented District 191. He was elected on May 18, 1999 in a special election. On June 1, 2015, he pleaded guilty to a bribery charge and was forced to resign his seat.
