= Peter Daniel Truman =

American politician

Member of the Pennsylvania House of Representatives from the 191st district
- In office January 4, 1983 – November 30, 1988
- Preceded by: Hardy Williams
- Succeeded by: Anthony Hardy Williams

Personal details
- Born: January 30, 1935 Philadelphia, Pennsylvania
- Died: February 13, 2018 (aged 83) Pennsylvania, U.S.
- Party: Democratic

Peter Daniel Truman (January 30, 1935 – February 13, 2018) was an American politician who was a Democratic member of the Pennsylvania House of Representatives. He was elected Clerk of Quarter Sessions serving from 1988-1992 and Democratic ward leader of the 3rd ward from 1982-1994.
