= Charles Brand (Ohio politician) =

American politician

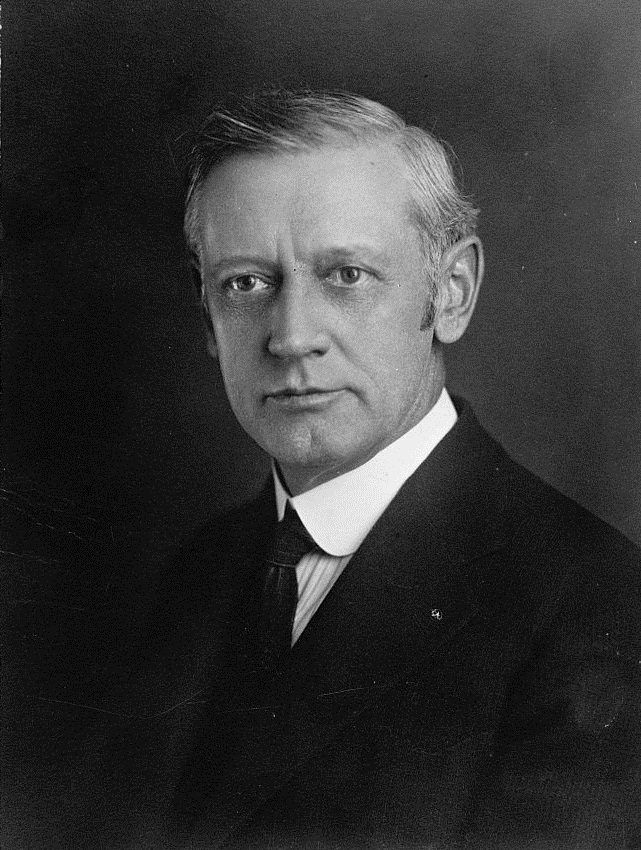

Member of the U.S. House of Representatives from Ohio's 7th district
- In office March 4, 1923 – March 3, 1933
- Preceded by: Simeon D. Fess
- Succeeded by: Leroy T. Marshall

Member of the Ohio Senate
- In office 1921–1922

Personal details
- Born: November 1, 1871 Urbana, Ohio, US
- Died: May 23, 1966 (aged 94) Melbourne Beach, Florida, US
- Resting place: Melbourne Cemetery
- Party: Republican
- Education: Ohio Wesleyan University

Charles Brand (November 1, 1871 – May 23, 1966) was an American businessman and politician who served five terms as a U.S. representative from Ohio from 1923 to 1933.

== Biography ==
Born in Urbana, Ohio, Brand attended the graded schools of his native city and Ohio Wesleyan University, Delaware, Ohio. He engaged in agricultural pursuits, manufacturing, and banking at Urbana. He served as member and president of the Urbana City Council from 1911 to 1912. He served as member of the Ohio State Senate in 1921 and 1922. He served as a member of the advisory committee of the War Finance Corporation in 1921.

=== Congress ===
Brand was elected as a Republican to the Sixty-eighth and to the four succeeding Congresses (March 4, 1923 – March 3, 1933). He was not a candidate for renomination in 1932.

=== Later career and death ===
He resumed former business pursuits until his retirement. He died in Melbourne Beach, Florida, May 23, 1966. He was interred in Melbourne Cemetery.

== Sources ==
- United States Congress. "Charles Brand (id: B000766)". Biographical Directory of the United States Congress.
- Media related to Charles Brand at Wikimedia Commons

U.S. House of Representatives
Preceded by Simeon D. Fess	Member of the U.S. House of Representatives from Ohio's 7th congressional district March 4, 1923–March 3, 1933	Succeeded by Leroy T. Marshall
