= Pennsylvania's 4th Senate district =

American legislative district

Pennsylvania's 4th State Senate district
Senator
Arthur L. Haywood III; D–Cheltenham Township
- Population (2021): 268,248

Pennsylvania State Senate District 4 includes parts of Montgomery County and Philadelphia County. It is currently represented by Democrat Arthur L. Haywood III.

== District profile ==
The district includes the following areas:

Montgomery County

- Abington Township
- Cheltenham Township
- Jenkintown
- Rockledge
- Springfield Township

Philadelphia County

- Ward 09
- Ward 10
- Ward 12 [PART, Divisions 01, 02, 03, 04, 05, 06, 07, 09, 10, 12, 13, 14, 18, 19, 20 and 21]
- Ward 17
- Ward 22
- Ward 50
- Ward 59

== Senators ==
Representative	Party	Years	District home	Note
John Hopkins	Federalist	1813 – 1817		
Charles Smith	Federalist	1815 – 1817		
Jacob Grosh	Federalist	1817 – 1821		
Molton Cropper Rogers	Democratic-Republican	1819 – 1820		
Edward Coleman	Federalist	1821 – 1823		
Isaac Dutton Barnard	Democratic-Republican	1821 – 1825		U.S. Senator for Pennsylvania from 1827 to 1831
Joshua Hunt	Federalist	1827 – 1829		
William Jackson	Anti-Masonic	1831 – 1833		
William Tennent Rogers	Democratic	1831 – 1839		
George C. Smith	Anti-Masonic	1833 – 1835		
Francis James	Anti-Masonic	1835 – 1836		U.S. Representative for Pennsylvania's 4th congressional district from 1839 to 1843
Samuel A. Smith	Republican	1841 – 1842		U.S. Representative for Pennsylvania's 8th congressional district from 1829 to 1833
William Williamson	Whig	1847 – 1848		
Hugh Jones Brooke	Whig	1849 – 1852		Pennsylvania State Senator for the 5th district from 1871 to 1872
Joseph Bailey	Democratic	1851 – 1853		U.S. Representative for Pennsylvania's 15th district from 1863 to 1865, U.S. Representative for Pennsylvania's 16th district from 1861 to 1863, Treasurer of Pennsylvania from 1854 to 1855, Pennsylvania State Senator for the 1st district in 1843, Pennsylvania State Representatives in 1840
Henry S. Evans	Whig	1851 – 1854		
James J. Lewis	Whig	1855 – 1856		
Mahlon Yardley	Republican	1859 – 1861		
William Kinsey	Democratic	1863 – 1864		
George C. Connell	Republican	1865 – 1870		
Henry Wolf Gray	Republican	1871 – 1872		
Alexander Kelly McClure	Republican	1873 – 1874		Pennsylvania State Representative from 1858 to 1859 and 1865 to 1866. Pennsylvania State Senator for the 18th district from 1861 to 1862
Horatio Gates Jones	Republican	1875 – 1881		
John J. MacFarlane	Republican	1883 – 1889		
C. Wesley Thomas	Republican	1891 – 1897		
J. Bayard Henry	Republican	1899 – 1901		
John T. Harrison	Republican	1903 – 1904		
Jesse S. Shepard	Republican	1903 – 1905		
Ernest Leigh Tustin	Republican	1907 – 1909		
John Oscar Sheatz	Republican	1913 – 1914		
Edward W. Patton	Republican	1915 – 1925		
Bertram G. Frazier	Republican	1929 – 1949		
John J. McCreesh	Democratic	1935 – 1958		
Thomas McCreesh	Democratic	1958 – 1968		Moved to 8th senatorial district and served from 1969 to 1974
Joseph J. Scanlon	Democratic	1969 – 1970		
Joseph F. Smith	Democratic	1971 – 1980		U.S. Representative for Pennsylvania's 3rd district from 1981 to 1983
Joseph M. Rocks	Republican	1981 – 1990		Pennsylvania State Representative for the 199th district from 1979 to 1982
Allyson Y. Schwartz	Democratic	1991 – 2005		Elected to represent Pennsylvania's 13th congressional district on November 2, 2004.
LeAnna M. Washington	Democratic	2005 – 2014		Elected May 17, 2005 to fill vacancy; lost 2014 primary election, resigned after being charged with a felony for using campaign staff and state resources to plan a fundraiser.
Arthur L. Haywood III	Democratic	2015 – present		Incumbent
