= Paul M. Lawson =

American politician

Member of the Pennsylvania House of Representatives from the 191st district
- In office January 7, 1969 – November 30, 1970
- Preceded by: District Created
- Succeeded by: Hardy Williams

Member of the Pennsylvania House of Representatives from the Philadelphia County district
- In office 1959–1968

Personal details
- Born: January 29, 1914 Franklin, Pennsylvania
- Died: February 10, 1988 (aged 74) Philadelphia, Pennsylvania
- Party: Democratic

Paul M. Lawson (January 29, 1914 – February 20, 1988) was a Democratic member of the Pennsylvania House of Representatives. He graduated from Penn State University.
