= Joe Hohenstein =

American politician

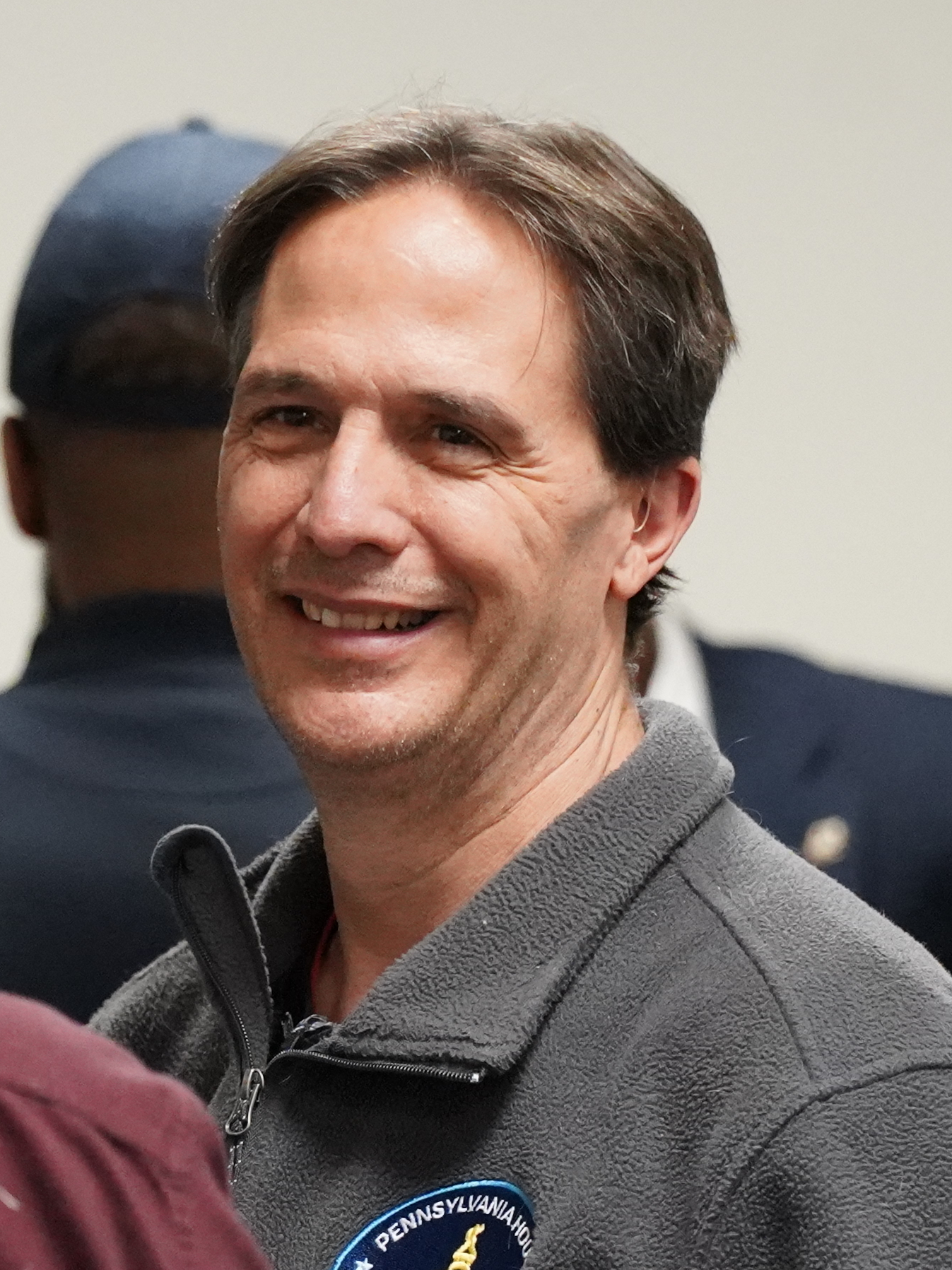

Member of the Pennsylvania House of Representatives from the 177th district
- Incumbent
- Assumed office January 1, 2019
- Preceded by: John J. Taylor

Personal details
- Born: June 24, 1967 (age 59)
- Party: Democratic
- Education: Earlham College
- Occupation: Attorney

Joseph C. Hohenstein (born June 24, 1967) is a Democratic member of the Pennsylvania House of Representatives. He has represented the 177th district since 2019.

Hohenstein was born in Philadelphia and his father was a member of the Philadelphia Federation of Teachers. Hohenstein graduated from Earlham College with a degree in international studies in 1989. He then attended law school at the University of Minnesota, where he received his J.D. in 1993 and passed the bar.

Hohenstein worked as a lawyer and served on the National Amicus Committee of the American Immigration Lawyers Association. He was the chairman of the board of the Frankford Friends School. Hohenstein has taught at Temple University Beasley School of Law and he developed the school's first immigration law clinic. In 2017, he represented two Syrian brothers and their families in a lawsuit against the Trump administration travel ban. He was elected to the Pennsylvania House of Representatives for the 177th district in 2018, defeating Pat Kozlowski.

Hohenstein lives in Philadelphia with his wife Brandi and two children Emma and Mars.
