= Pennsylvania House of Representatives, District 186 =

American legislative district

Pennsylvania's 186th State House of Representatives district
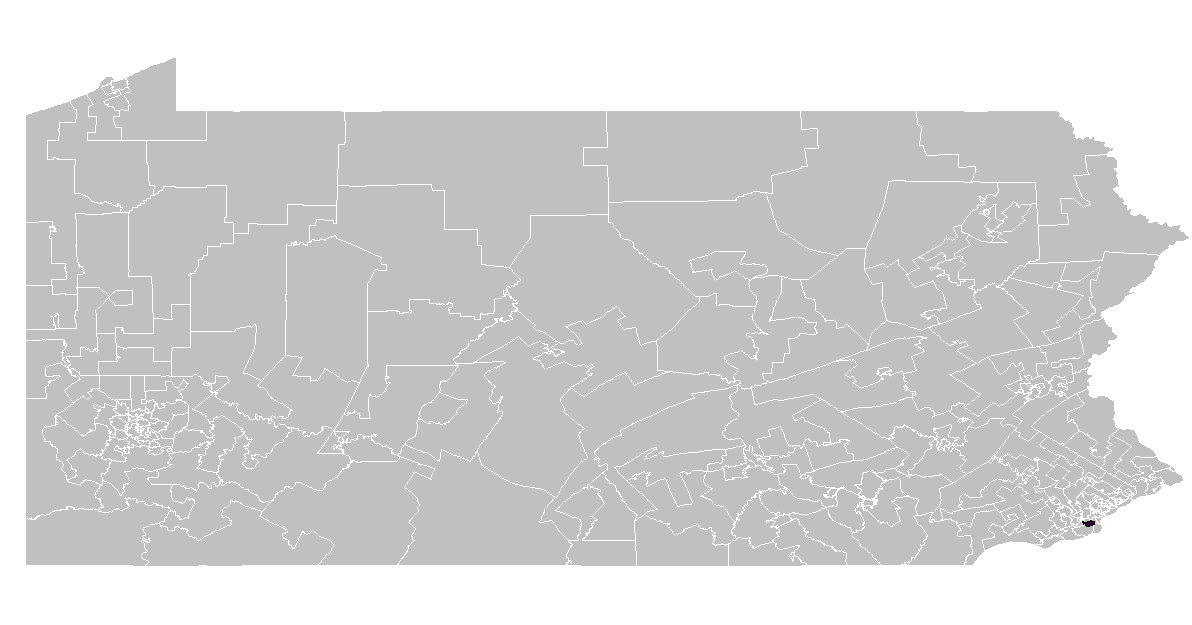
Representative
Jordan A. Harris; D–Philadelphia
- Demographics: 25.8% White; 60.2% Black; 4.4% Hispanic
- Population (2011) • Citizens of voting age: 61,186; 46,799

The 186th Pennsylvania House of Representatives District is located in Southeast Pennsylvania and has been represented since 2013 by Jordan A. Harris.

== District profile ==
The 186th Pennsylvania House of Representatives District is located in Philadelphia County and encompasses the Aquinas Center and the African Cultural Alliance of North America. It also includes the following areas:

- Ward 30
- Ward 36 [PART, Divisions 01, 02, 03, 04, 05, 06, 07, 08, 09, 14, 16, 17, 18, 19, 20, 21, 22, 23, 24, 25, 26, 27, 28, 29, 30, 31, 32, 33, 34, 35, 36, 37, 38, 39, 40 and 41]
- Ward 48 [PART, Divisions 04, 05, 06, 07, 08, 09, 10, 11, 12, 15, 16, 17, 18, 19, 21, 22 and 23]
- Ward 51 [PART, Divisions 03, 07, 08, 09, 10, 11, 12, 21, 22 and 24]

== Representatives ==
Representative	Party	Years	District home	Note
Prior to 1969, seats were apportioned by county.
Earl Vann	Democrat	1969 – 1976		
Edward A. Wiggins	Democratic	1977 – 1988		
David L. Shadding	Democratic	1979 – 1980		
Harold James	Democratic	1989 – 2008		Defeated in primary
Kenyatta Johnson	Democratic	2009 – 2012		Resigned upon election to the Philadelphia City Council
Harold James	Democratic	2012 – 2013		Elected in special election. Incumbent's predecessor

== Recent election results ==
PA House election, 2010: Pennsylvania House, District 186
Party	Candidate	Votes	%	±%
Democratic	Kenyatta Johnson	16,668	93.0	
Republican	Keith Todd	1,254	7.0	
Margin of victory		15,414	86.0	
Turnout		17,922	100.0	

PA House special election, 2012: Pennsylvania House, District 186
Party	Candidate	Votes	%	±%
Democratic	Harold James	4,586	93.96	
Republican	Barbara Hankinson	295	6.04	
Margin of victory		4,291	87.92	
Turnout		4,881	100	

PA House election, 2012: Pennsylvania House, District 186
Party	Candidate	Votes	%	±%
Democratic	Jordan A. Harris	26,469	100.0	
Margin of victory				
Turnout		26,469	100.0	

PA House election, 2014: Pennsylvania House, District 186
Party	Candidate	Votes	%	±%
Democratic	Jordan A. Harris	16,070	100.0	
Margin of victory				
Turnout		16,070	100.0	

PA House election, 2016: Pennsylvania House, District 186
Party	Candidate	Votes	%	±%
Democratic	Jordan A. Harris	29,455	100.0	
Margin of victory				
Turnout		29,455	100.0	
