= Diane McKinney-Whetstone =

American novelist

- Born: August 14, 1953 (age 73)
- Education: University of Pennsylvania (BA)
- Occupation: Author
- Spouse: Greg Whetstone
- Children: 2
- Parent(s): Paul McKinney; Bessie Grayson

Diane McKinney-Whetstone (born August 14, 1953) is an American author and is a member of the University of Pennsylvania Creative Writing program faculty. Her works of fiction have won numerous awards, including the BCALA Literary Award for Fiction from the Black Caucus of the American Library Association, Inc. in 2005 and 2009.

== Biography ==
McKinney-Whetstone is African American. She is the second of five daughters born to Pennsylvania State Senator Paul McKinney and his wife Bessie, with an older sister from her father's previous relationship, and also an older brother and sister from her mother’s first marriage. Diane received a BA in English from the University of Pennsylvania in 1975. She is married to Greg Whetstone and they have twins, Taiwo, a daughter and Kehinde, a son.

McKinney-Whetstone began writing when she was 39, joining the Rittenhouse Writer's Group, founded by University of Pennsylvania instructor James Rahn. She won a Pennsylvania Council on the Arts grant for a 500-page first draft. Her first novel, Tumbling, was published in 1996 by William Morrow and Company.

She is mentioned in:

- Booklist, April 15, 1996, February 15, 1998, February 15, 2000.
- Book Quarterly, April 4–11, 1996.
- The Detroit News, June 1, 1996.
- Essence, July 1996 November 1999, August 2000.
- Kirkus Reviews, March 15, 1996.
- Library Journal, June 15, 1996, March 1, 1998, October 1, 1999, November 1, 1999.
- Penn Arts & Sciences, fall 1996.
- The Pennsylvania Gazette, May 1998.
- People, May 27, 1996.
- School Library Journal, October 1998.
- Women's Review of Books, July 1996.

== Selected works ==
- Tumbling, 1996
- Tempest Rising, 1998
- Blues Dancing, 1999
- Leaving Cecil Street, 2004
- Trading Dreams at Midnight, 2008
- Lazaretto: A Novel, 2016
- Our Gen, 2022
- Family Spirit, 2025

== Awards and recognition ==
- Athenaeum Literary Award, Athenaeum of Philadelphia
- Pennsylvania Council on the Arts grant
- Finalist, Pew Fellowship in the Arts
- Zora Neale Hurston Society award for creative contribution to literature
- Citation, Commonwealth of Pennsylvania
- Author of the Year Award, Go On Girl Book Club
- American Library Association Black Caucus Award for Fiction, 2005 and 2009
