= Earl Vann =

American politician

Member of the Philadelphia City Council at-large
- In office 1976–1980
- Preceded by: Edgar C. Campbell Sr.
- Succeeded by: Augusta Clark

Member of the Pennsylvania House of Representatives from the 186th district
- In office January 7, 1969 – December 31, 1975
- Preceded by: District created
- Succeeded by: Edward Wiggins

Member of the Pennsylvania House of Representatives from the Philadelphia County district
- In office January 2, 1967 – November 30, 1968

Personal details
- Born: Kenneth Earl Bernard Vann; October 18, 1913 Wilmington, North Carolina, U.S.
- Died: October 23, 1985 (aged 72) Philadelphia, Pennsylvania, U.S.
- Resting place: Mount Lawn Cemetery, Sharon Hill, Pennsylvania
- Party: Democratic

Kenneth Earl Bernard Vann (October 18, 1913 – October 23, 1985) was an American politician who served as a Democratic member of the Pennsylvania House of Representatives in 1964 and from 1967 to 1975. He subsequently served as an at-large member of the Philadelphia City Council from 1976 to 1980.

== Early life and career ==
Vann was born in Wilmington, North Carolina, on October 18, 1913. He graduated from South Philadelphia High School and attended the University of Pennsylvania. During World War II, he served in the United States Coast Guard from 1942 to 1945.

From 1955 to 1963, Vann worked as an inspector of Pennsylvania state buildings. He became a clerk for Philadelphia's Board of Revision of Taxes in 1963 and worked as a city tax revenue collector from 1963 to 1964. He also served as secretary of the 36th Ward Democratic Executive Committee.

== Political career ==
=== Pennsylvania House of Representatives ===
Vann won a special election to the Pennsylvania House of Representatives on April 28, 1964, and was sworn in on June 16. He did not seek reelection that year. He returned to the House following his election in 1966 and served continuously from 1967 until his resignation on December 31, 1975.

During his House service, Vann chaired the Urban Affairs Committee. He was also appointed to the Legislative Budget and Finance Committee in 1975.

=== Philadelphia City Council ===
Vann was elected to the Philadelphia City Council in November 1975, alongside fellow Democratic state representatives James Tayoun and Lucien Blackwell. He served as an at-large council member from 1976 to 1980.

He was defeated in 1979 and subsequently worked as a salesman at a sporting goods store.

== Death ==
Vann died in Philadelphia on October 23, 1985, at the age of 72. He was buried at Mount Lawn Cemetery in Sharon Hill, Pennsylvania.
