= Leroy T. Marshall =

American politician

Member of the U.S. House of Representatives from Ohio's 7th district
- In office March 4, 1933 – January 3, 1937
- Preceded by: Charles Brand
- Succeeded by: Arthur W. Aleshire

Member of the Ohio Senate
- In office 1925-1928

Personal details
- Born: Leroy Tate Marshall; November 8, 1883 Bellbrook, Ohio, U.S.
- Died: November 22, 1950 (aged 67) Xenia, Ohio, U.S.
- Resting place: Woodland Cemetery
- Party: Republican
- Spouse: Nellie Catherine Turnbull
- Education: Cedarville University

Leroy Tate Marshall (November 8, 1883 – November 22, 1950) was an American lawyer and politician who served two terms as a U.S. representative from Ohio from 1933 to 1937.

== Biography ==
Born on a farm near Bellbrook, Ohio, Marshall attended the public schools of Greene County, Ohio, where he was a teacher in the public schools from 1903 to 1907. He graduated from Cedarville (Ohio) College in 1909 and moved to Xenia, Ohio, serving as clerk of courts, Greene County from 1909 to 1913. He studied law and was admitted to the Ohio bar in 1911, commencing the practicing of law in Xenia, Ohio.

=== Early political activism ===
He served as chairman of the Greene County Republican county committee from 1920 to 1932, also serving as member of the Ohio State Senate from 1925 to 1928.

=== Congress ===
Marshall was elected as a Republican to the Seventy-third and Seventy-fourth Congresses (March 4, 1933 – January 3, 1937). He was an unsuccessful candidate for reelection in 1936 to the Seventy-fifth Congress.

=== Later career and death ===
He returned to Xenia to continue the practice of law until his death there, on November 22, 1950.

He was interred in Woodland Cemetery in Dayton.

He married Nellie Catherine Turnbull at Cedarville on June 4, 1908.

== Sources ==
- United States Congress. "Leroy T. Marshall (id: M000158)". Biographical Directory of the United States Congress.

- Broadstone, Michael (1918). History of Greene County, Ohio: Its People, Industries and ... Vol. 2. p. 186.

U.S. House of Representatives
Preceded by Charles Brand	United States Representative from Ohio's 7th congressional district 1933–1937	Succeeded by Arthur W. Aleshire
Ohio Senate
Preceded by G. G. O. Pence	Senator from 5th-6th District; 1925-1928	Succeeded by Milton J. Scott
