= John J. McVeigh =

American army soldier (1925–2008)

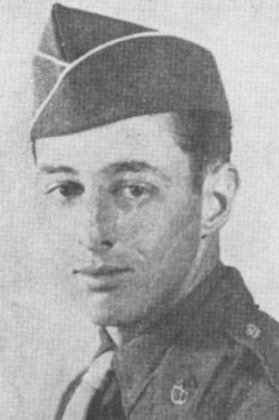
- McVeigh in 1944
- Born: John Joseph McVeigh; September 26, 1921; Philadelphia, Pennsylvania, U.S.
- Died: August 29, 1944 (aged 22) near Brest, France
- Burial place: Holy Sepulchre Cemetery
- Military career
- Allegiance: United States of America
- Branch: United States Army
- Service years: 1942–1944
- Rank: Sergeant
- Units: 23rd Infantry Regiment, 2nd Infantry Division
- Conflicts: World War II; Battle for Brest †
- Awards: Medal of Honor

John Joseph McVeigh (September 26, 1921 – August 29, 1944) was a United States Army soldier and a recipient of the United States highest military decoration —the Medal of Honor—for his actions during the Battle for Brest in World War II.

== Early life ==
John Joseph McVeigh was born Philadelphia, Pennsylvania, on 26 September 1921. His family was hit hard by the Great Depression; Unable to keep the household together, they sent him to live with his aunt and uncle who owned a bar. Before entering the army he worked at a rustproofing company.

== Military service ==
McVeigh entered the army in Philadelphia in September 1942. He trained at Camp McCoy and his unit was shipped to Northern Ireland in October 1943. By August 29, 1944, was serving as a sergeant in Company H, 23rd Infantry Regiment, 2nd Infantry Division. During a German counterattack on that day, near Brest, France, he directed his squad's fire and, when his position was almost overrun, single-handedly charged the Germans with his only weapon, a trench knife. McVeigh was killed in the attack and, on April 6, 1945. On 20 April 1945, his daughter, Joan. was presented the Medal of Honor, at Independence Hall, Philadelphia, by Brigadier General Malcolm F. Lindsey.

McVeigh, aged 22 at his death, was buried in the Holy Sepulchre Cemetery, Cheltenham, Pennsylvania.

== Medal of Honor citation ==
Sergeant McVeigh's official Medal of Honor citation reads:

For conspicuous gallantry and intrepidity at risk of his life above and beyond the call of duty near Brest, France, on 29 August 1944. Shortly after dusk an enemy counterattack of platoon strength was launched against 1 platoon of Company G, 23d Infantry. Since the Company G platoon was not dug in and had just begun to assume defensive positions along a hedge, part of the line sagged momentarily under heavy fire from small arms and 2 flak guns, leaving a section of heavy machineguns holding a wide frontage without rifle protection. The enemy drive moved so swiftly that German riflemen were soon almost on top of 1 machinegun position. Sgt. McVeigh, heedless of a tremendous amount of small arms and flak fire directed toward him, stood up in full view of the enemy and directed the fire of his squad on the attacking Germans until his position was almost overrun. He then drew his trench knife, and single-handed charged several of the enemy. In a savage hand-to-hand struggle, Sgt. McVeigh killed 1 German with the knife, his only weapon, and was advancing on 3 more of the enemy when he was shot down and killed with small arms fire at pointblank range. Sgt. McVeigh's heroic act allowed the 2 remaining men in his squad to concentrate their machinegun fire on the attacking enemy and then turn their weapons on the 3 Germans in the road, killing all 3. Fire from this machinegun and the other gun of the section was almost entirely responsible for stopping this enemy assault, and allowed the rifle platoon to which it was attached time to reorganize, assume positions on and hold the high ground gained during the day.

== See also ==
- List of Medal of Honor recipients

== Sources ==
- "Medal of Honor recipients - World War II (M-S)". Medal of Honor citations. United States Army Center of Military History. June 8, 2009. Archived from the original on 2008-04-30.
