= David Shadding =

American politician

David L. Shadding

Member of the Pennsylvania House of Representatives from the 186th district
- In office 1979–1980
- Preceded by: Edward Wiggins
- Succeeded by: Harold James

Personal details
- Born: February 8, 1941 (age 85)
- Party: Democratic

David L. Shadding (born February 8, 1941) is a former Democratic member of the Pennsylvania House of Representatives.
