= Carol Campbell (politician) =

American politician in Pennsylvania

Member of the Philadelphia City Council from the 4th district
- In office November 27, 2006 – January 7, 2008
- Preceded by: Michael Nutter
- Succeeded by: Curtis J. Jones Jr.

Personal details
- Born: Philadelphia, Pennsylvania, U.S.
- Died: November 19, 2008 Philadelphia, Pennsylvania, U.S.
- Party: Democratic
- Parent: Edgar C. Campbell Sr. (father)

Carol Ann Campbell (died November 19, 2008) was the Democratic Councilwoman representing Philadelphia's Fourth City Council District. Campbell was narrowly defeated for renomination by Curtis J. Jones, Jr. on May 15, 2007.

She is the daughter of former councilman Edgar Campbell. She was under investigation by the Pennsylvania Attorney General for corruption charges prior to her death in November 2008.

Campbell was Secretary of the Democratic City Committee and Chair of the Alliance of Black Ward Leaders.
