= Edgar C. Campbell Sr. =

American politician

Edgar Campbell

Chair of the Philadelphia Democratic Party
- Acting; March 10, 1983 – April 14, 1983
- Preceded by: David Glancey
- Succeeded by: Joseph F. Smith

Member of the Philadelphia City Council At-Large
- In office January 1, 1968 – January 5, 1976
- Preceded by: Walter S. Pytko
- Succeeded by: Earl Vann

Personal details
- Born: Edgar Cuthbert Campbell; November 11, 1902 Savannah, Georgia, United States
- Died: September 30, 1987 (aged 84) Philadelphia, Pennsylvania, United States
- Party: Republican (until 1928); Democratic (1928–1987)
- Spouse: Pearl B. Williams (m. 1925; died 1974)
- Children: Carol; Sonny

Edgar Cuthbert Campbell Sr. (November 11, 1902 – September 30, 1987) was an American politician and civil servant who served on the Philadelphia City Council from 1968 to 1976. He also served as clerk of the city's Quarter Sessions Court and as acting chair of the Philadelphia Democratic Party.

== Early life ==
Campbell was born on November 11, 1902, in Savannah, Georgia, and was his parents' only child. His father, a sawmill foreman, lost half of his arm in a workplace accident and later operated a grocery store.

Around 1920, Campbell moved with his family to Philadelphia. He attended First African Baptist Church with his mother.

== Political career ==
=== Early political involvement ===
Campbell became involved in local politics after moving to Philadelphia. Initially a supporter of the Republican Party, he later joined the Democratic Party. He served as an aide to Philadelphia City Council President George X. Schwartz and as a Democratic committeeman in the Fourth Ward, eventually becoming its ward leader.

=== Philadelphia City Council ===
In 1968, Campbell was elected to his first public office at age 65 as an at-large member of the Philadelphia City Council. He lost the primary for re-election in 1975.

=== Clerk of Quarter Sessions Court and party leadership ===
Following Campbell's primary defeat, Mayor Frank Rizzo agreed to let him run for clerk of Quarter Sessions Court as a replacement for the primary winner, who had since died. Campbell won the office in the general election. He was re-elected in 1979 and 1983.

In 1983, Campbell served as acting chair of the Philadelphia Democratic Party.

== Personal life ==
In 1923, Campbell met Pearl B. Williams while they were members of the same wedding party. Williams was the daughter of a minister in the African Methodist Episcopal Church. The couple married in 1925. She died on September 3, 1974. They had two children, Carol Ann and Edgar Jr., known as "Sonny", both of whom became active in city politics.

== Death ==
Campbell died on September 30, 1987. At the time of his death, he was widely described as the "dean" of the city's Black political leaders.

Party political offices
Preceded by David Glancey	Chair of the Philadelphia Democratic Party; 1983	Succeeded by Joseph F. Smith
