= John J. Taylor (Pennsylvania politician) =

American politician

Member of the Pennsylvania House of Representatives from the 177th district
- In office 1985–2018
- Preceded by: Gerald F. McMonagle
- Succeeded by: Joseph C. Hohenstein

Personal details
- Born: April 9, 1955 (age 71) Philadelphia, Pennsylvania
- Party: Republican
- Education: University of Central Florida (BA); Temple University (JD)
- Occupation: Attorney

John J. Taylor (born April 9, 1955) is an American legislator who served as a member of the Pennsylvania House of Representatives from the 177th Legislative District of Pennsylvania, from 1984 - 2018. He was Republican Chairman of the House Liquor Control Committee and a member of the House Urban Affairs Committee. Taylor was the chairman of the Republican City Committee from June 2013 to February 2016.

== Career ==
Taylor was first elected in 1984 at the age of 29, defeating incumbent Rep. Gerald McMonagle to represent the Kensington section of Philadelphia.

Taylor announced he would not seek re-election to the House in September 2017. The subsequent election was won by Joseph C. Hohenstein. He succeeded Taylor in January 2019.

Taylor is of counsel to the Philadelphia law firm of Pelino & Lentz P.C. Taylor is Ward Leader of the 25th Ward Republican Executive Committee in Philadelphia.

== Personal ==
Taylor is a 1980 graduate of the University of Central Florida in 1980 and earned his juris doctor at Temple University School of Law in 1984.

He resides in the Northwood section of Philadelphia with his wife, Evelyn. They have four children, two sons and two daughters.
