= Edward Wiggins =

American politician

Edward A. Wiggins

Member of the Pennsylvania House of Representatives from the 186th district
- In office 1977–1988
- Preceded by: Earl Vann
- Succeeded by: David Shadding

Personal details
- Born: March 13, 1933 Philadelphia, Pennsylvania
- Died: March 9, 2015 (aged 81) Philadelphia, Pennsylvania
- Party: Democratic

Edward A. Wiggins (March 13, 1933 – March 9, 2015) was a Democratic member of the Pennsylvania House of Representatives. He died in 2015 of heart failure.
