= Harold James (Pennsylvania politician) =

American politician (1942–2022)

Member of the Pennsylvania House of Representatives from the 186th district
- In office May 8, 2012 – 2013
- Preceded by: Kenyatta Johnson
- Succeeded by: Jordan A. Harris
- In office January 3, 1989 – November 30, 2008
- Preceded by: David Shadding
- Succeeded by: Kenyatta Johnson

Personal details
- Born: August 7, 1942 Philadelphia, Pennsylvania, U.S.
- Died: April 28, 2022 (aged 79) Philadelphia, Pennsylvania, U.S.
- Party: Democratic
- Education: Temple University
- Profession: police officer

Harold James (August 7, 1942 – April 28, 2022) was a Democratic politician, and member of the Pennsylvania House of Representatives. Before his election to the House of Representatives, James served as a police officer.

== Biography ==
James represented the 186th District from 1989 until 2008, serving as the first Chairman of the Gaming Oversight Committee, which was formed at the start of the 2007 legislation session. He was then defeated in the primary election by Kenyatta Johnson.

Later, after winning a special election to replace Johnson (who was elected to Philadelphia City Council), he served from April 2012 through January 2013. He chose not to run for reelection to a full term in 2012.

In 2015, he was found guilty of corruption.

== Death ==
James died in Philadelphia on April 28, 2022, at the age of seventy-nine.
