= Hardy Williams =

American politician

Member of the Pennsylvania Senate from the 8th district
- In office January 4, 1983 – November 30, 1998
- Preceded by: Paul McKinney
- Succeeded by: Anthony Hardy Williams

Member of the Pennsylvania House of Representatives from the 191st district
- In office January 5, 1971 – November 30, 1982
- Preceded by: Paul Lawson
- Succeeded by: Peter Daniel Truman

Personal details
- Born: April 14, 1931 Philadelphia, Pennsylvania
- Died: January 7, 2010 (aged 78) Philadelphia, Pennsylvania
- Party: Democratic

Hardy Williams (April 14, 1931 – January 7, 2010) was an American politician who served as a Democratic member of the Pennsylvania State Senate for the 8th district from 1983 to 1998.

== Background ==
He faced criticism in the 1980s for questions over his campaign finance practices. In 1998, he retired hours before the deadline to file nominating petitions, allowing his son Anthony Hardy Williams the opportunity to run unopposed for his father's 8th senatorial district seat. The younger Williams had already filed his nominating petitions to run for his House seat, so he remained on both ballots. He resigned his House seat when he won both elections simultaneously.

Hardy Williams died on January 7, 2010, at the Kearsley Home in the Wynnefield section of Philadelphia.
