= National Bar Association =

African American legal association

- Type: Legal society
- Headquarters: Washington, DC
- Location: United States
- Members: 67,000 in 2023
- Website: http://www.nationalbar.org/

The National Bar Association (NBA) was founded in 1925 and is the United States' oldest and largest national network of predominantly African American attorneys and judges. It represents the interests of approximately 67,000 lawyers, judges, law professors, and law students.

The NBA is organized around 26 substantive law sections, 10 divisions, 12 regions, and numerous affiliate chapters throughout the United States and around the world. Centennial President Wiley Adams is the 82nd president to lead the organization. He will be followed by President-Elect Ashley L. Upkins.

== Structure and activities ==
The National Bar Association (NBA) is governed by a Board of Governors, mostly elected from the membership but also including NBA's officers and representatives of groups such as the NBA's Divisions.

The National Bar Association Young Lawyers Division, represents the new members of the legal profession, and membership is open to NBA members who have been admitted to practice for less than 10 years or are under 40 years old. The association has several affiliate chapters located throughout the United States, including The Cook County Bar Association, The Barristers' Association of Philadelphia, the California Association of Black Lawyers, the Washington Bar Association, the Virgil Hawkins Florida Chapter National Bar Association, the Garden State Bar Association, the Black Women Lawyers Association of Northern California, and the Metropolitan Black Bar Association.

The National Bar Institute (NBI) is the philanthropic arm of the NBA, founded in 1982. The association has established an annual award in honor of the late Louisiana State Representative Pinkie C. Wilkerson of Grambling—the "Pinkie C. Wilkerson Outstanding State Legislator of the Year Award". The NBA offers a job listing service as well as advertising in its magazine to assist employers seeking to conduct affirmative action outreach toward minority job applicants.

The Women's Lawyers Division (WLD) of the National Bar Association (NBA) was established in 1972 as a dedicated group to address the unique issues and challenges faced by women in the legal profession. The division aims to support the professional development, mentorship, and networking of its members, primarily African-American women lawyers, judges, and law students.

The WLD provides various programs, including the "We Empower Mentoring Program," which pairs mentees with experienced mentors to help guide them through their legal careers. This program also awards stipends to mentees for attending the NBA Annual Convention.

== History ==
The National Bar Association was established in 1925 as the "Negro Bar Association" after Gertrude Rush, George H. Woodson, S. Joe Brown, James B. Morris, and Charles P. Howard Sr., were denied membership in the American Bar Association. The young Charles Hamilton Houston, future dean of Howard University Law School, also helped with the founding.

Its first president was George H. Woodson of Des Moines, Iowa. Arnette Hubbard became the NBA's first female president in 1981.

In 1940, the NBA attempted to establish "free legal clinics in all cities with a colored population of 5,000 or more." Its members supported litigation that achieved a US Supreme Court ruling that defendants had to be provided with legal counsel.

In 2010, the NBA partnered with the U.S. Census Bureau to work toward a complete and accurate count of the nation's population through various outreach activities.

== Affiliates ==
=== Alabama ===
- Birmingham: Brazil Bar Association
- Montgomery: Alabama Lawyers Association

=== Arkansas ===
- Little Rock: W. Harold Flowers Society

=== California ===
- Los Angeles: Black Women Lawyers Association of Los Angeles
- Los Angeles: John M. Langston Bar Association
- Mill Valley: CA Association of Black Lawyers
- Oakland: Charles Houston Bar Association
- Sacramento: Wiley M. Manuel Bar Association
- San Diego: Earl B. Gilliam Bar Association
- Santa Clara: Black Women Lawyers Association of Northern CA

=== District of Columbia ===
- Washington: Morocco
- Washington: Washington Bar Association
- Washington: GWAC

=== Delaware ===
- Wilmington: Delaware Barristers Association

=== Florida ===
- Apopka: Virgil Hawkins Florida Chapter

=== Georgia ===
- Atlanta: Georgia Association of Black Women Attorneys
- Atlanta: Gate City Bar Association
- Carrollton

=== Illinois ===
- Chicago: Cook County Bar Association

=== Indiana ===
- Indianapolis: Marion County Bar Association

=== Kentucky ===
- Lexington: John Rowe Chapter
- Louisville: Charles W. Anderson Jr. Bar Association

=== Louisiana ===
- Baton Rouge: Louis A. Martinet – Baton Rouge

=== Massachusetts ===
- Boston: Mass. Black Lawyers Association

=== Maryland ===
- Baltimore: Alliance of Black Women Attorneys
- Baltimore: Monumental City Bar Association
- Greenbelt: J. Franklyn Bourne Bar Association

=== Michigan ===
- Detroit: Wolverine Bar Association
- Lansing: Davis-Dunning Affiliate Chapter
- Troy: D. Augustus Straker Bar Association

=== Minnesota ===
- Minneapolis: Minnesota Association of Black Lawyers

=== Missouri ===
- Kansas City: Jackson County Bar Association
- St. Louis: Mound City Bar Association ()

=== Mississippi ===
- Jackson: Magnolia Bar Association

=== New Jersey ===
- Trenton: Garden State Bar Association

=== New Mexico ===
- Albuquerque: New Mexico Black Lawyers Association

=== Nevada ===
- Las Vegas: Las Vegas Chapter

=== New York ===
- New York: Metropolitan Black Bar Association
- New York: Association of Black Women Attorneys
- Rochester: Rochester Black Bar Association
- Wheatley Heights: Amistad Long Island Black Bar

=== Ohio ===
- Cincinnati: Black Lawyers Association of Cincinnati
- Cleveland: Norman S. Minor Bar Association
- Columbus: John Mercer Langston Bar Association

=== Pennsylvania ===
- Philadelphia: Barristers Association of Philadelphia

=== Tennessee ===
- Memphis: Ben F. Jones Chapter
- Nashville: Napier-Looby Chapter
- Tennessee Alliance of Black Lawyers

=== Texas ===
- Austin: Austin Black Lawyers Association
- Dallas: J.L. Turner Legal Association
- Dallas: AA Lawyers of TX State Bar
- Fort Worth: L. Clifford Davis Legal Association
- Houston: Houston Lawyers Association

=== Virginia ===
- Richmond: Old Dominion Bar Association

=== Washington ===
- Seattle: Loren Miller Bar Association

== See also ==
- Union Internationale des Avocats
