= Pennsylvania House of Representatives, District 191 =

American legislative district

Pennsylvania's 191st State House of Representatives district
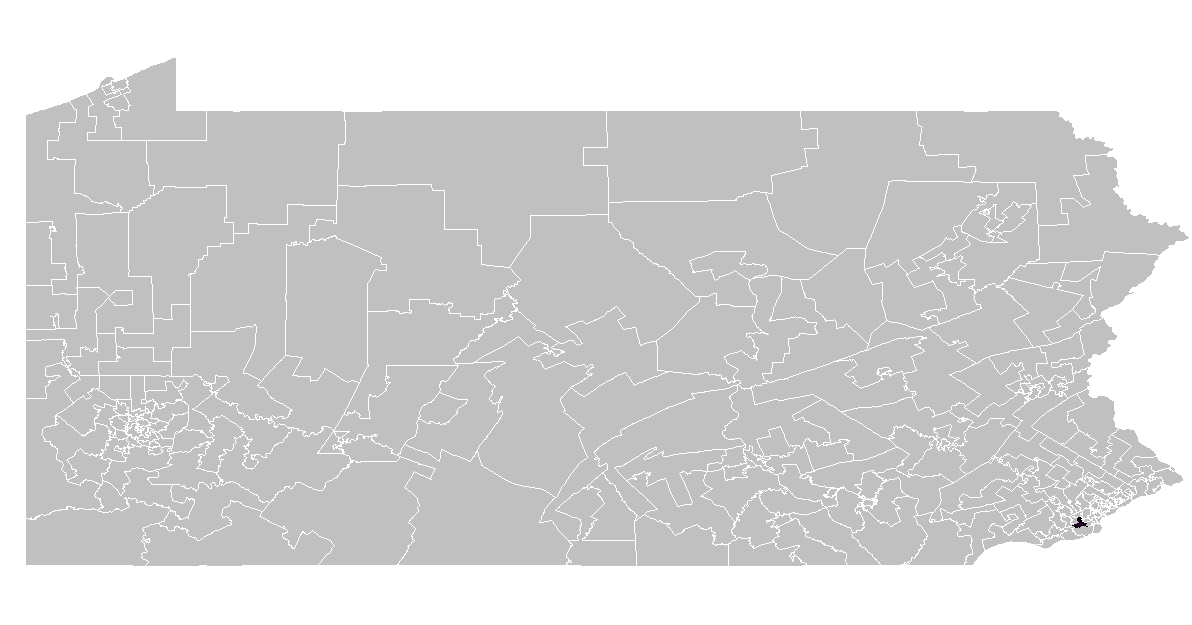
Representative
Joanna McClinton; D–Philadelphia

The 191st Pennsylvania House of Representatives District is located in Delaware County and Philadelphia County and includes the following areas:

- Delaware County
  - Yeadon (PART, Precincts 01, 04, 06, 07 and 09)
- Philadelphia (PART)
  - Ward 03
  - Ward 40 [PART, Divisions 02, 03, 04, 05, 06, 07, 08, 09, 10, 11, 12, 13, 14, 19, 20, 21, 23, 24, 25, 26, 33, 34 and 47]
  - Ward 51 [PART, Divisions 01, 23, 25 and 27]
  - Ward 60 [PART, Divisions 07, 19 and 22]

It has been represented by Democrat Joanna McClinton since 2015, who has also served as the Speaker of the House of Representatives since 2023.

== Representatives ==
Representative	Party	Years	District home	Note
Prior to 1969, seats were apportioned by county.
Paul M. Lawson	Democratic	1969 – 1970		
Hardy Williams	Democratic	1971 – 1982		
Peter Daniel Truman	Democratic	1983 – 1988		
Anthony Hardy Williams	Democratic	1989 – 1998		Was elected simultaneously to the Senate and the House of Representatives on November 3, 1998. He chose the Senate, leaving the House seat vacant.
Ronald G. Waters	Democratic	1999 – 2015		Elected May 18, 1999, to fill vacancy Resigned June 1, 2015
Joanna E. McClinton	Democratic	2015 – present		Elected August 11, 2015, to fill vacancy

== Recent election results ==
PA House election, 2022: Pennsylvania House of Representatives, District 191
Party	Candidate	Votes	%
Democratic	Joanna McClinton	Unopposed	
Total votes		17,359	100.00
Democratic hold			
