= James T. Nulty =

American politician

Pennsylvania Senate, District 8
- In office 191–1914
- Preceded by: John T. Murphy
- Succeeded by: William Wallace Smith

Personal details
- Born: May 9, 1857 Philadelphia, Pennsylvania, US
- Died: February 26, 1935 (aged 77) Philadelphia, Pennsylvania, US
- Party: Fusion Democrat

James T. Nulty (May 9, 1857 – February 26, 1935) was an American politician from Philadelphia, Pennsylvania who served as a Fusion Democrat member of the Pennsylvania Senate for the 8th District from 1911-1914. He was a funeral home owner and an inventor who held multiple patents in steel production.

== Early life ==
Nulty was born in the Frankford section of Philadelphia, Pennsylvania and was educated in the public and parochial schools.

== Business career ==
He began working for William and Harvey Rowland and was promoted to the position of metal roller. While working at Rowlands, he invented a railroad spike and a two-piece rail which doubled as an electrical power line conduit and short grounding system (U.S. Patent No. 372,273). The two-piece rail was sold to the Johnstown Railway Company in 1888.

In 1882, Nulty established a funeral home business in the Frankford section of Philadelphia.

As an embalmer, Nulty was the inventor of the "Derma" formula embalming process that was used by undertakers throughout the nation at the turn of the 20th century.

The Nulty family continues to operate the Nulty Funeral Home business.

== Political career ==
He was elected to the Pennsylvania Senate for the 8th district and served from 1913-1914. During his legislative tenure, Nulty served on Senate committees for Military Affairs, Public Supply of Light, Heat and Water and Education.

== Personal life ==
Nulty was a member of the Knights of Columbus, Ancient Order of Hibernians, St. Patrick's Alliance, Foresters of America, B.P.O.E. No. 2 and the Undertakers Association.
