= Pennsylvania's 8th Senate district =

American legislative district

Pennsylvania's 8th State Senate district
Senator
Anthony Hardy Williams; D–Philadelphia
- Population (2021): 256,726

Pennsylvania State Senate District 8 includes parts of Delaware County and Philadelphia County. It is currently represented by Democrat Anthony Hardy Williams.

== District profile ==
The district includes the following areas:

Delaware County

- Collingdale
- Colwyn
- Darby
- Darby Township
- Folcroft
- Norwood
- Sharon Hill
- Tinicum Township
- Yeadon

Philadelphia County

- Ward 03
- Ward 26 [PART, Divisions 04, 05, 06, 07, 08, 09, 10, 11, 12, 13, 14, 15, 16, 17, 18, 19, 21 and 22]
- Ward 27 [PART, Divisions 01, 02, 04, 05, 07, 08, 09, 10, 12, 14, 15, 16, 17, 19, 20, 21, 22 and 23]
- Ward 36
- Ward 40 [PART, Divisions 01, 02, 03, 04, 05, 06, 07, 08, 09, 10, 11, 12, 13, 14, 15, 16, 17, 18, 19, 20, 21, 22, 23, 24, 25, 26, 27, 28, 29, 31, 32, 33, 34, 35, 36, 37, 39, 41, 42, 43, 44, 45, 46, 47, 48, 49, 50 and 51]
- Ward 46 [PART, Divisions 01, 02, 03, 04, 05, 06, 08, 09, 10, 11, 12, 13, 14, 15, 16, 17, 18, 20 and 21]
- Ward 48
- Ward 51
- Ward 60 [PART, Divisions 06, 07, 10, 11, 17, 18, 19, 20, 21 and 22]

== Senators ==
Representative	Party	Years	District home	Note
Henry Jarrett	Democratic-Republican	1813 – 1816		
Thomas Jones Rogers	Democratic-Republican	1815 – 1818		U.S. Representative for Pennsylvania's 6th congressional district from 1818 to 1823 and for Pennsylvania's 8th congressional district from 1823 to 1824
John Erwin	Democratic-Republican	1817 – 1818		
Joseph Fry, Jr.	Democratic-Republican	1817 – 1820		Member of the Pennsylvania House of Representatives from 1816 to 1817. U.S. Representative for Pennsylvania's 7th congressional district from 1827 to 1831
Henry Winter	Democratic-Republican	1819 – 1822		Pennsylvania State Senator for the 12th district from 1823 to 1826
John Andrew Schulze	Democratic-Republican	1821 – 1824		6th Governor of Pennsylvania
John Harrison	National Republican	1823 – 1824		
Adam Ritscher	Democratic-Republican	1823 – 1826		
George Seltzer	Democratic	1827 – 1830		
Jacob Stoever	Democratic	1831 – 1834		
John Harper	Anti-Masonic	1835 – 1836		Pennsylvania State Senator for the 7th district from 1837 to 1838
David Rittenhouse Porter	Democratic	1835 – 1837		Pennsylvania State Representative in 1819. 9th Governor of Pennsylvania
Isaac Slenker	Democratic	1837 – 1838		
James Martin Bell	Whig	1837 – 1839		
Robert Plunket Maclay	Whig	1839 – 1841		
James Mathers	Whig	1841 – 1842		
Francis Wade Hughes	Democratic	1843 – 1844		Secretary of the Commonwealth of Pennsylvania from 1852 to 1853. Pennsylvania Attorney General from 1853 to 1855
Henry C. Eyer	Democratic	1843 – 1844		Pennsylvania State Senator for the 15th district from 1845 to 1846
George Rahn	Democratic	1845 – 1846		
William A. Overfield	Jackson Democrat	1847 – 1848		
Charles Frailey	Democratic	1851 – 1852		Pennsylvania State Senator for the 9th district from 1835 to 1840
David Taggart	Whig	1855 – 1858		Speaker in 1857
Thomas Craig, Jr.	Democratic	1857 – 1860		
Henry Spering Mott	Republican	1861 – 1862		
Hiester Clymer	Democratic	1861 – 1866		U.S. Representative for Pennsylvania's 8th congressional district from 1873 to 1881
Joseph Depuy Davis	Democratic	1867 – 1874		
Jacob Crouse	Republican	1875 – 1876		
William Imlay Newell	Republican	1877 – 1882		
Benjamin F. Hughes	Republican	1883 – 1886		
Henry S. Taylor	Republican	1887 – 1889		Died in office
Jacob Crouse	Republican	1889 – 1898		
David Martin	Republican	1899 – 1902		Pennsylvania Senator for the 5th district from 1917 to 1920
Horatio Balch Hackett	Republican	1903 – 1905		
Vivian Frank Gable	Democratic	1905 – 1906		
John T. Murphy	Republican	1907 – 1910		
James T. Nulty	Fusion Democrat	1911 – 1914		
William Wallace Smith	Republican	1915 – 1918		
George Gray	Republican	1919 – 1922		
Thaddeus Stevens Krause	Republican	1923 – 1934		
Walter S. Pytko	Democratic	1935 – 1938		
Louis H. Farrell	Republican	1939 – 1950		
John F. Byrne, Sr.	Democratic	1951 – 1952		
Francis P. McCusker	Republican	1953 – 1954		
William Vincent Mullin	Democratic	1955 – 1966		
Thomas McCreesh	Democratic	1967 – 1974		Pennsylvania State Senator for the 4th senatorial district from 1959 to 1966
Paul McKinney	Democratic	1975 – 1982		
Hardy Williams	Democratic	1983 – 1998		Pennsylvania State Representative for the 191st district from 1971 to 1982
Anthony Hardy Williams	Democratic	1999 – present		Pennsylvania State Representative for the 191st district from 1989 to 1998. Democratic Whip of the Pennsylvania Senate since 2011
