= Jordan A. Harris =

American politician

Jordan Harris
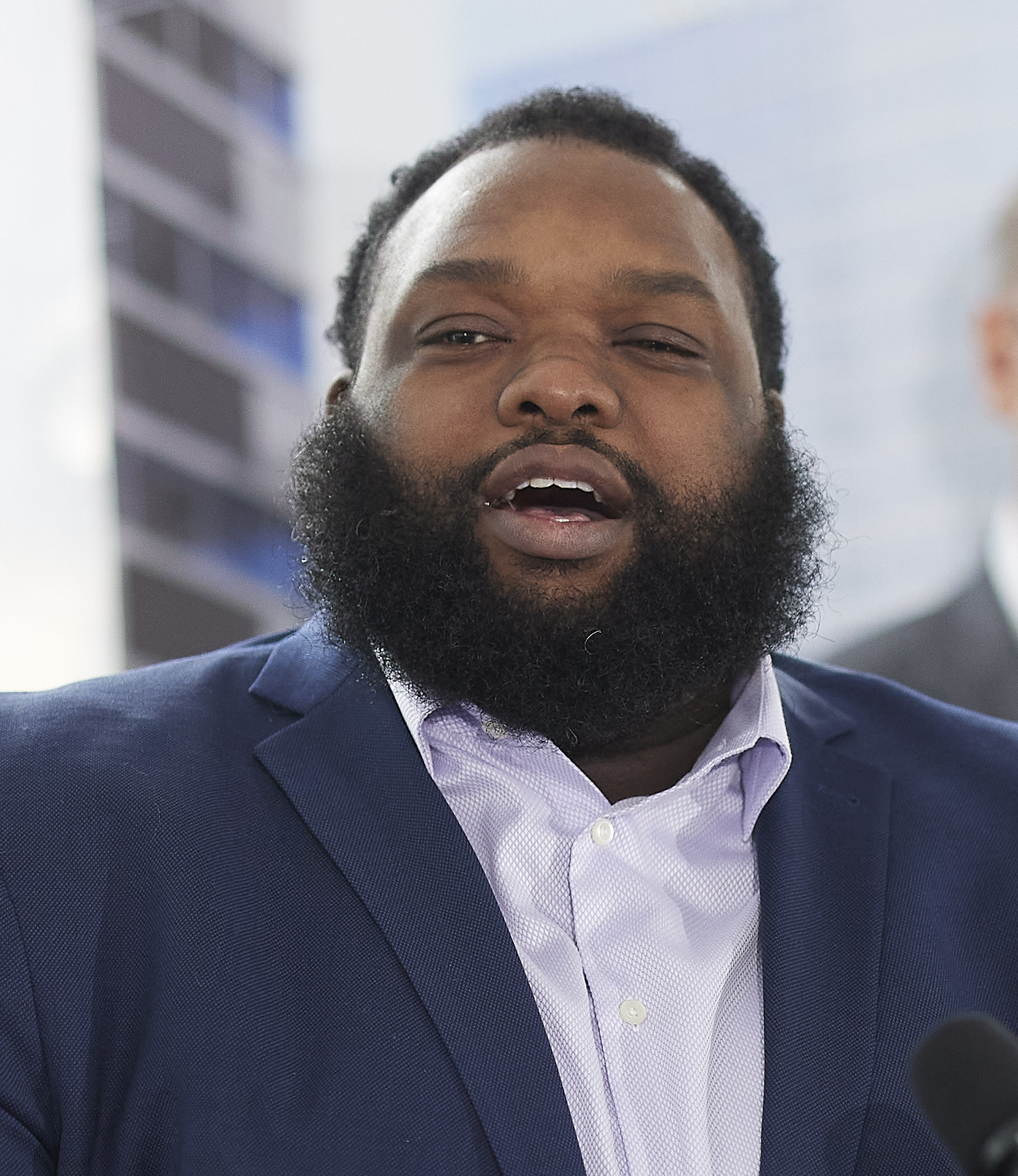

Member of the Pennsylvania House of Representatives from the 186th district
- Incumbent
- Assumed office January 1, 2013
- Preceded by: Harold James

Personal details
- Born: May 12, 1984 (age 42) Philadelphia, Pennsylvania, U.S.
- Party: Democratic
- Education: Millersville University (BA); Cabrini University (MEd); Neumann University
- Profession: Legislator
- Website: Official website

Jordan A. Harris is an American politician who has served in the Pennsylvania House of Representatives since 2013, representing the 186th district in South and Southwest Philadelphia. A member of the Democratic Party, he currently serves as chairman of the House Appropriations Committee.

Harris is a member of the Knight Foundation's Philadelphia Community Advisory Committee.

== Early life and education ==
Harris attended John Bartram Motivation High School in Philadelphia. Harris holds a bachelor's degree in governmental and political affairs from Millersville University and a master's degree in education from Cabrini College. He is currently enrolled in a doctoral program at Neumann University. Harris is a former teacher in the Philadelphia Public Schools. He has served in city government, rising to the position of director of the Philadelphia Youth Commission.

== Political career ==
Since his election to the Pennsylvania House of Representatives in 2012, Harris has advocated for criminal justice reform, supporting clean slate bills to allow people convicted of felonies to, after a certain amount of time, have their conviction removed from their record. Harris worked on this legislation since he was sworn into office, and Governor Tom Wolf signed the Clean Slate Act in June 2018. As of June 2022, over 40 million Pennsylvanians have had their record sealed as a result of the law.

Harris was selected by the Pennsylvania Democratic Party as one of 20 delegates to the United States Electoral College for Joe Biden and his running mate, Kamala Harris, in the 2020 United States presidential election.

Harris previously served as the Chair of the Pennsylvania House Legislative Black Caucus and served as the Democratic Whip in the 2021-2022 legislative session.

In May 2023, Harris, along with fellow Philadelphia-area Representative Jared Solomon, established the legislative Black-Jewish Caucus.
