= Joseph A. Sullivan =

American politician

Member of the Pennsylvania House of Representatives from the 177th district
- In office 1969–1976
- Preceded by: District created
- Succeeded by: Agnes M. Scanlon

Member of the Pennsylvania House of Representatives from the Philadelphia County district
- In office 1959–1968

Personal details
- Born: August 9, 1911 Philadelphia, Pennsylvania
- Died: March 15, 2002 (aged 90) Philadelphia, Pennsylvania
- Party: Democratic

Joseph A. Sullivan (August 9, 1911 – March 15, 2002) was a former Democratic member of the Pennsylvania House of Representatives.

In 1975 he was elected sheriff and served two terms after mayor Frank Rizzo encouraged him to run. He was also leader of the 25th ward from 1965 to 1984.
