= The Barristers' Association of Philadelphia =

The Barristers’ Association of Philadelphia, Pennsylvania
- Barristers' Association logo
- Formation: 1950
- Purpose: Professional development of Black lawyers in the City of Philadelphia
- Headquarters: Philadelphia, Pennsylvania
- Region served: Philadelphia, Pennsylvania
- Members: 1,000 Black lawyers, judges and law students
- President: Courtney Richardson
- Affiliations: National Bar Association
- Website: http://www.phillybarristers.com

The Barristers' Association of Philadelphia, Incorporated is a minority bar association located in Philadelphia, Pennsylvania, which represents African-American attorneys. The association was established in 1950. The Barristers' Association of Philadelphia is an affiliate of the National Bar Association. One notable member of the Barristers is John F. Street, the former Mayor of Philadelphia. The purpose of the Barristers is to address the professional needs and development of Black lawyers in the City of Philadelphia through programs such as seminars, cultural events and publications.

In 1973, members of the Barristers’ Association served on the Liacouras Commission, which investigated ways to eliminate racial discrimination in Pennsylvania Bar admission procedures. In 1978, the Barristers’ Association joined other concerned groups in filing an action against the Philadelphia Registration Commission which resulted in the addition of 50,000 Philadelphians to the voter registration pools. In 1983, the Barristers’ Association provided testimony before the Pennsylvania State Legislature on the issue of the merit selection of judges.

In more recent years, the Barristers’ Association has sponsored or participated in activities that promoted youth awareness and career opportunities in the legal profession, and increased citizens’ awareness of their rights under the law. Scholarships to minority law students at local law schools are awarded annually to further encourage and support Black students in their pursuit of a degree in law. Continuing legal education seminars and political education forums are offered to members of the Barristers’ Association to facilitate professional development and political awareness.

Today, the Barristers’ Association continues to provide a forum for discussion and dissemination of information of matters of particular interest to Black attorneys and the Philadelphia Black community at large. The Barristers' offers an attorney referral program to its members. In 2016, the Barristers' opposed House Bill 1538, which aimed to prohibit public officials from publicly releasing the names of police officers who used firearms or force to seriously injure civilians until the end of an official investigation. Some of its signature programs include the Annual Thanksgiving Turkey Drive, the Dr. Martin Luther King, Jr. Annual Memorial Breakfast and accompanying Day of Service Project, the Annual Awards and Scholarship Gala, and the Annual Expungement Clinic.

The Barristers’ Association's membership encompasses a network of approximately 1,000 lawyers and jurists who serve society at the highest positions in both the private and public sectors of the legal profession. As an affiliate of the National Bar Association, the Barristers’ Association is an active participant in a community of practicing Black lawyers, judges and law students in all 50 states and the District of Columbia.

== Organization ==
The Barristers’ Association's structure consists of an Executive Committee and an Advisory Board. The Executive Committee is responsible for the operation of the organization and is composed of elected officers and appointed members. The Advisory Board, which is made up of distinguished members of the legal profession, provides advice and counsel to the Executive Committee.

It operates under law for 501(c)(6) Business Leagues. In 2024 it claimed $87,665 in total revenue and $122,467 in total assets. It had $131,999 in expenses.
