= Holy Sepulchre Cemetery (Cheltenham Township, Pennsylvania) =

Catholic cemetery in Pennsylvania

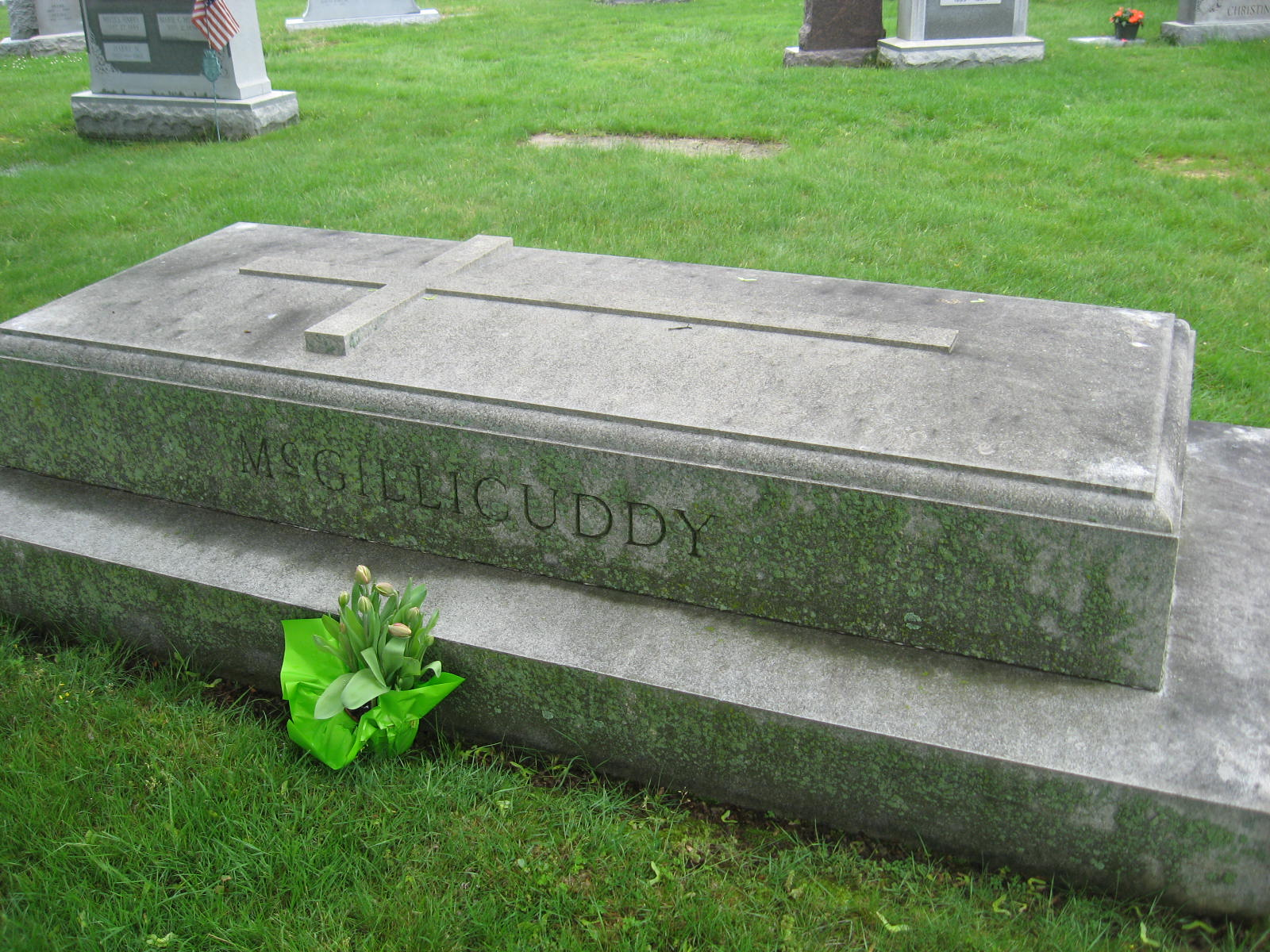
- The gravesite of Connie Mack in the cemetery
- Interactive map of Holy Sepulchre Cemetery

Details
- Established: 1894
- Location: 3301 W. Cheltenham Avenue, Cheltenham Township, Pennsylvania, U.S.
- Country: United States
- Coordinates: 40.0862°N 75.1710°W
- Type: Catholic Church
- Owned by: Archdiocese of Philadelphia
- Website: www.philadelphiacatholiccemeteries.com/cemeteries/holy-sepulchre-cemetery
- Find a Grave: Holy Sepulchre Cemetery

Holy Sepulchre Cemetery is a Catholic cemetery owned by the Archdiocese of Philadelphia and located in Cheltenham Township, Pennsylvania, United States. It has a Philadelphia mailing address, 3301 West Cheltenham Avenue, Philadelphia, Pennsylvania, but the grounds are in Cheltenham Township, Montgomery County. It was established in 1894 and is managed by StonMor Partners.

The cemetery contains a large bronze statue of Christ created by J. Otto Schweizer in 1949. The statue depicts Christ with his hands raised in a blessing and is named "Benediction".

== Notable burials ==
- Stan Baumgartner (1894–1955), Major League Baseball pitcher
- Henry Burk (1850–1903), U.S. Congressman
- James J. Connolly (1881–1952), U.S. Congressman
- Michael Crescenz (1949–1968), Medal of Honor recipient, reinterred in Arlington National Cemetery
- Clare G. Fenerty (1895–1952), U.S. Congressman
- William J. Green Jr. (1910–1963), U.S. Congressman
- Bill Hallman (1867–1920), Major League Baseball player
- Bill Hewitt (1909–1947), professional football player
- Frank "Lefty" Hoerst (1917–2000), Major league baseball pitcher
- John B. Kelly Sr. (1889–1960), Olympic gold medalist in rowing, father of Grace Kelly
- John B. Kelly Jr. (1927–1985), Olympic bronze medalist in rowing
- Matt Kilroy (1866–1940), Major League Baseball pitcher
- Raymond Lederer (1938–2008), U.S. Congressman
- James R. Lloyd, Jr. (1950–1989), Pennsylvania State Senator
- James Washington Logue (1863–1925), U.S. Congressman
- Connie Mack (1862–1956), Hall of Fame baseball player and manager
- Billy Maharg (1881–1953), Major League Baseball player and professional boxer
- William McAleer (1838–1912), U.S. Congressman
- John J. McVeigh (1921–1944), Medal of Honor recipient
- Austin Meehan (1897–1961), Philadelphia politician
- Francis J. Myers (1901–1956), U.S. Congressman
- Robert N. C. Nix Jr. (1928–2003), Chief Justice of the Supreme Court of Pennsylvania
- Robert N. C. Nix Sr. (1898–1987), U.S. Congressman, first African American to represent Pennsylvania in the United States House of Representatives
- David Reilly (1971–2005), lead singer of the band God Lives Underwater
- Frank Rizzo (1920–1991), mayor of Philadelphia
- Joseph J. Scanlon (1924–1970), Pennsylvania State Senator
- Steve Yerkes (1888–1971), Major League Baseball player

== See also ==
- Archdiocese of Philadelphia
- Holy Cross Cemetery (Yeadon, Pennsylvania)
