= Anthony H. Williams =

American politician

Anthony Hardy Williams
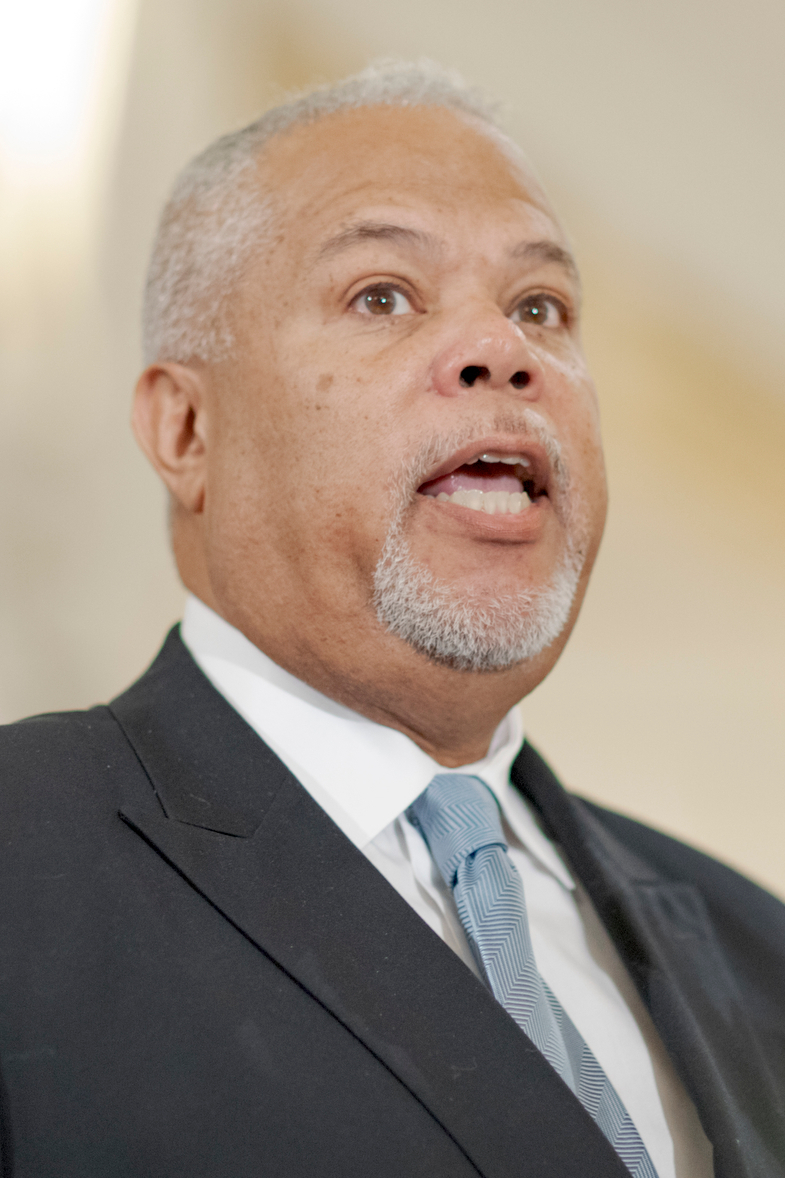

Member of the Pennsylvania Senate from the 8th district
- Incumbent
- Assumed office January 5, 1999
- Preceded by: Hardy Williams

Democratic Whip of the Pennsylvania Senate
- In office January 25, 2011 – November 15, 2022
- Preceded by: Michael O'Pake
- Succeeded by: Christine Tartaglione

Member of the Pennsylvania House of Representatives from the 191st district
- In office January 3, 1989 – November 30, 1998
- Preceded by: Peter Truman
- Succeeded by: Ronald Waters

Personal details
- Born: February 28, 1957 (age 69)
- Party: Democratic
- Other political affiliations: Forward Party (2023–present)
- Spouse: Shari
- Education: Franklin and Marshall College

Anthony Hardy Williams (born February 28, 1957) is an American politician, former businessman, and Democratic member of the Pennsylvania State Senate, representing the 8th District since 1998. Prior to entering public service, he worked at PepsiCo as a mid-level executive and later owned a small vending company.

== Life and career ==
Williams is the son of Hardy, a politician, and Carole, an elementary school teacher. He grew up in Philadelphia. He attended Anderson Elementary School (one block from his home, where his mother taught), Mitchell Elementary School, Conwell Middle Magnet School and Westtown School. He then earned a degree in economics from Franklin & Marshall College.

He was sworn in to represent the 191st legislative district in the Pennsylvania House of Representatives in 1989. In 1992, Williams’s first wife sent a letter to all of his House colleagues vividly describing his infidelity. In 1998, Williams' father, Pennsylvania State Senator Hardy Williams, retired hours before the deadline to file nominating petitions, allowing Anthony the opportunity to run unopposed for his father's 8th senatorial district seat. The younger Williams had already filed his nominating petitions to run for his House seat, so he remained on both ballots. He declined to take his House seat when he won both elections simultaneously.

On June 21, 2023, Williams along with fellow State Senator Lisa Boscola announced they were affiliating with Andrew Yang's Forward Party, though they were not dropping their membership of the Democratic Party and the State Senate's Democratic caucus.

== Current committees and assignments ==
Williams is the Democratic chairman of the State Government Committee and the Life Sciences Caucus. He is also a member of the Pennsylvania Council on the Arts and chairs the Black Elected Officials of Philadelphia County, an ad hoc group encompassing federal, state and municipal politicians of color. In January 2011, following the death of Michael O'Pake, Williams was elected Democratic Whip.

For the 2025–2026 Session, Williams sits on the following committees in the State Senate:

- Community, Economic & Recreational Development (Minority Chair)
- Banking & Insurance
- Education
- State Government

== Ward leader ==
Williams is the Ward Leader of the 3rd Ward Democratic Executive Committee. He also chairs the Philadelphia Democratic United Ward Leaders of Color, a group of ward leaders of color who represent various wards within The City and County of Philadelphia.

== Gubernatorial candidacy ==
On February 23, 2010, Williams declared his candidacy for Governor in the 2010 election. In the May primary, he finished third out of four candidates.

2010 Democratic Gubernatorial Primary results
Party	Candidate	Votes	%
Democratic	Dan Onorato	452,611	45.1
Democratic	Jack Wagner	244,234	24.3
Democratic	Anthony Williams	180,932	18.0
Democratic	Joe Hoeffel	125,989	12.6
Total votes		1,003,766	97.7
