= John McCreesh =

American politician

John J. McCreesh

Member of the Pennsylvania Senate from the 4th district
- In office January 1, 1935 – 1958
- Preceded by: Bertram Frazier
- Succeeded by: Thomas McCreesh

Personal details
- Born: August , 1881 County Armagh, Ireland
- Died: September 10, 1959 (aged 83) West Philadelphia, Pennsylvania, United States

John J. McCreesh (August 1881 – September 10, 1959) was an American politician from Pennsylvania who served as a Democratic member of the Pennsylvania State Senate for the 4th district from 1935 to 1958. He was born in Armagh County, Ireland now a part of Northern Ireland. Upon his retirement in 1958, he was succeeded by his son Thomas McCreesh.
