= Thomas McCreesh =

American politician

Thomas P. McCreesh

Member of the Pennsylvania Senate from the 4th district
- In office 1959–1968
- Preceded by: John J. McCreesh
- Succeeded by: Joseph J. Scanlon

Member of the Pennsylvania Senate from the 8th district
- In office 1969–1974
- Succeeded by: Paul McKinney

Personal details
- Born: March 2, 1928 Philadelphia, Pennsylvania, US
- Died: February 19, 2016 (aged 87) Media, Pennsylvania, US
- Spouse: Rita McTamney (m.1963–2005; her death)
- Occupation: real estate broker and appraiser

Thomas P. McCreesh (March 2, 1928 – February 19, 2016) was an American politician from Pennsylvania who served as a Democratic member of the Pennsylvania State Senate for the 4th district from 1959 to 1968 and for the 8th district from 1969 to 1974. He succeeded his father John J. McCreesh in the senate upon his retirement in 1958.

== Early life and education ==
He was born in Philadelphia, Pennsylvania to John J. and Susan (née McCabe) McCreesh. He was a rowing champion in 1948 for the Penn Athletic Rowing Association. He served in the Korean War. He was a real estate broker and appraiser. He attended Saint Joseph's University and, in 1950, graduated with a Bachelor of Science degree in political science. In 1963, he married Rita McTamney. He also served as a page in the Pennsylvania State senate in the 1940s.
