= 2022 United States Senate election in Pennsylvania =

- November 8, 2022
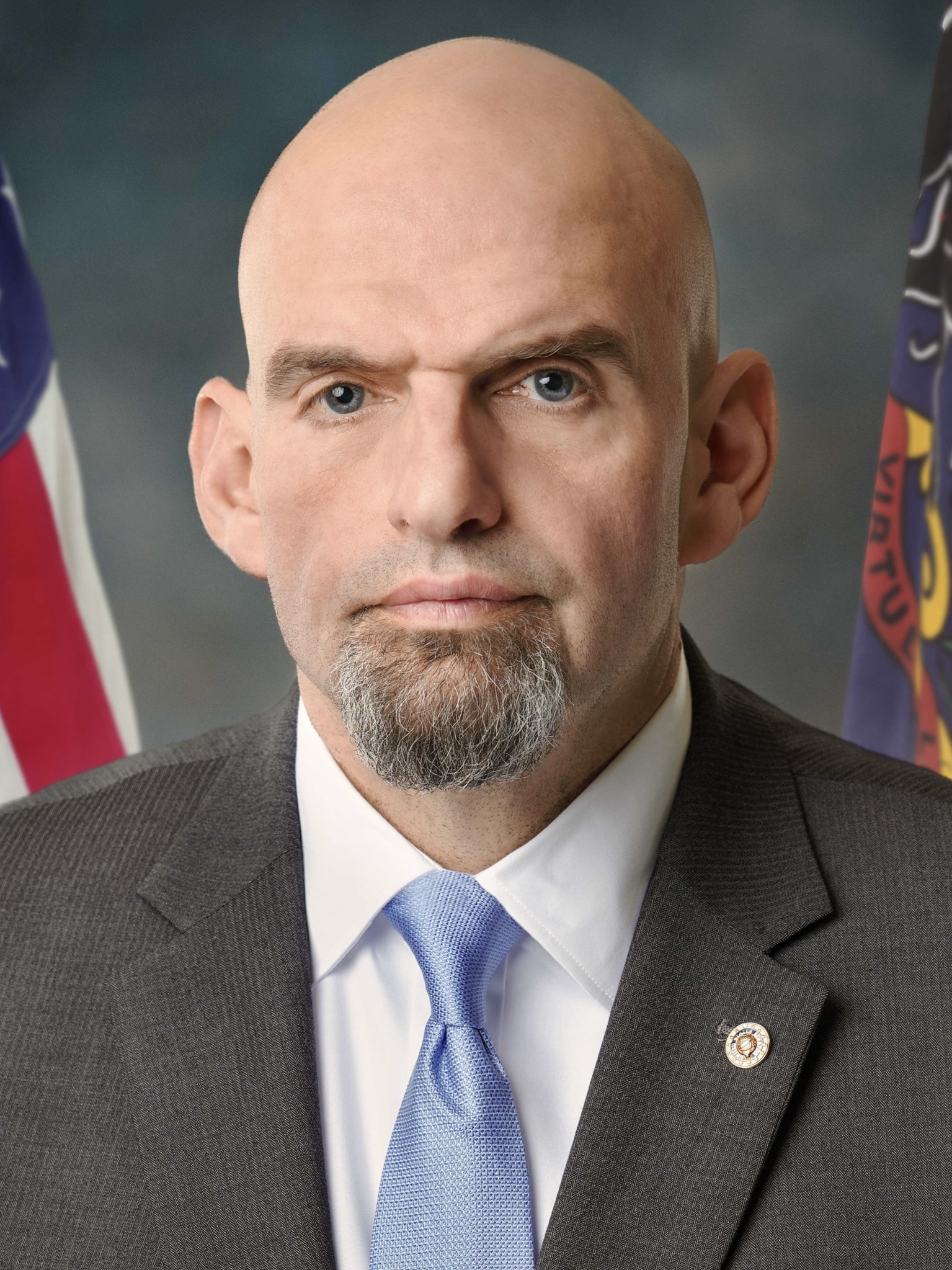

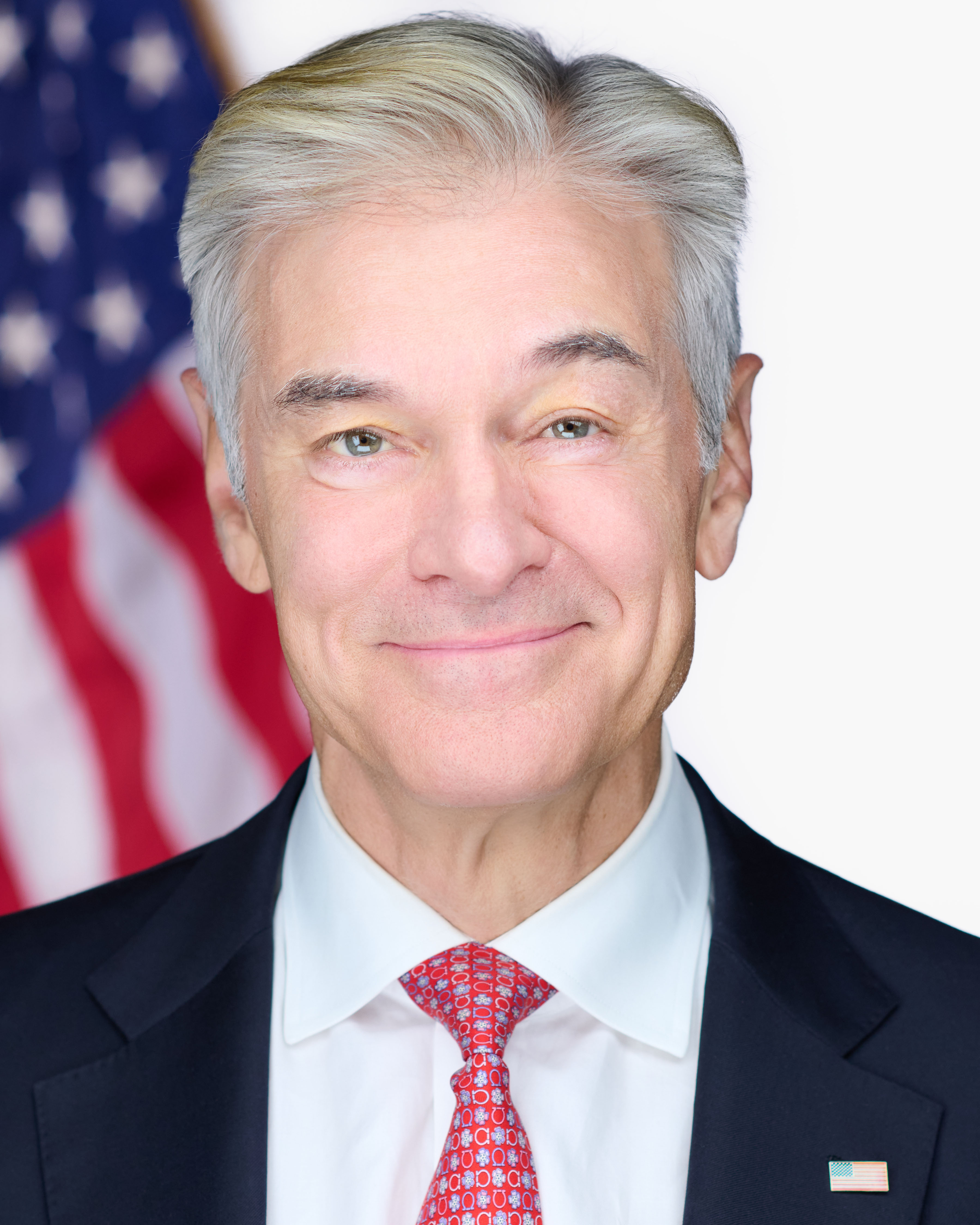
Nominee	John Fetterman	Mehmet Oz
Party	Democratic	Republican
Popular vote	2,751,012	2,487,260
Percentage	51.17%	46.27%
- Fetterman: 40–50% 50–60% 60–70% 70–80% 80–90% >90% Oz: 40–50% 50–60% 60–70% 70–80% 80–90% >90% Tie: 40–50% 50% No data
U.S. senator before election
Pat Toomey
Republican
Elected U.S. senator
John Fetterman
Democratic

The 2022 United States Senate election in Pennsylvania was held on November 8, 2022, to elect a member of the United States Senate to represent the Commonwealth of Pennsylvania. Democratic lieutenant governor John Fetterman defeated Republican surgeon Mehmet Oz to win his first term in office. Fetterman succeeded Republican incumbent Pat Toomey, who did not seek re-election to a third term. This was the only U.S. Senate seat to flip parties in 2022.

In the May 17 primary, Fetterman won the Democratic nomination with 59% of the vote over Representative Conor Lamb and state Representative Malcolm Kenyatta. Oz finished with a 0.1% margin ahead of businessman Dave McCormick in the Republican primary, triggering an automatic recount. McCormick conceded the nomination on June 3, making Oz the first Muslim candidate to be nominated by either major party for U.S. Senate.

As the only open Republican-held Senate seat in a state won by Joe Biden in the 2020 presidential election, the race was among the most competitive of the 2022 midterms and characterized as highly contentious. Fetterman framed Oz as an elitist carpetbagger with a radical anti-abortion stance in the wake of Dobbs v. Jackson Women's Health Organization overturning Roe v. Wade, while Oz framed Fetterman as a socialist insufficiently committed to fighting crime. Fetterman's health was also a major issue due to him suffering a stroke days before his primary victory. Although Fetterman led most pre-election polls, concerns towards his health and a scrutinized debate performance helped Oz take a narrow lead before the election.

Despite Oz's lead in final polls, Fetterman won by a 4.9% margin, helping provide Senate Democrats a net gain of one seat and their first outright majority since 2015. With Fetterman's victory, elected Democrats held both U.S. Senate seats from Pennsylvania for the first time since 1947. (Note: Democrats held both of Pennsylvania's Senate seats from 2009 to 2011 when Arlen Specter, who was elected as a Republican, switched to the Democratic Party.)

== Republican primary ==
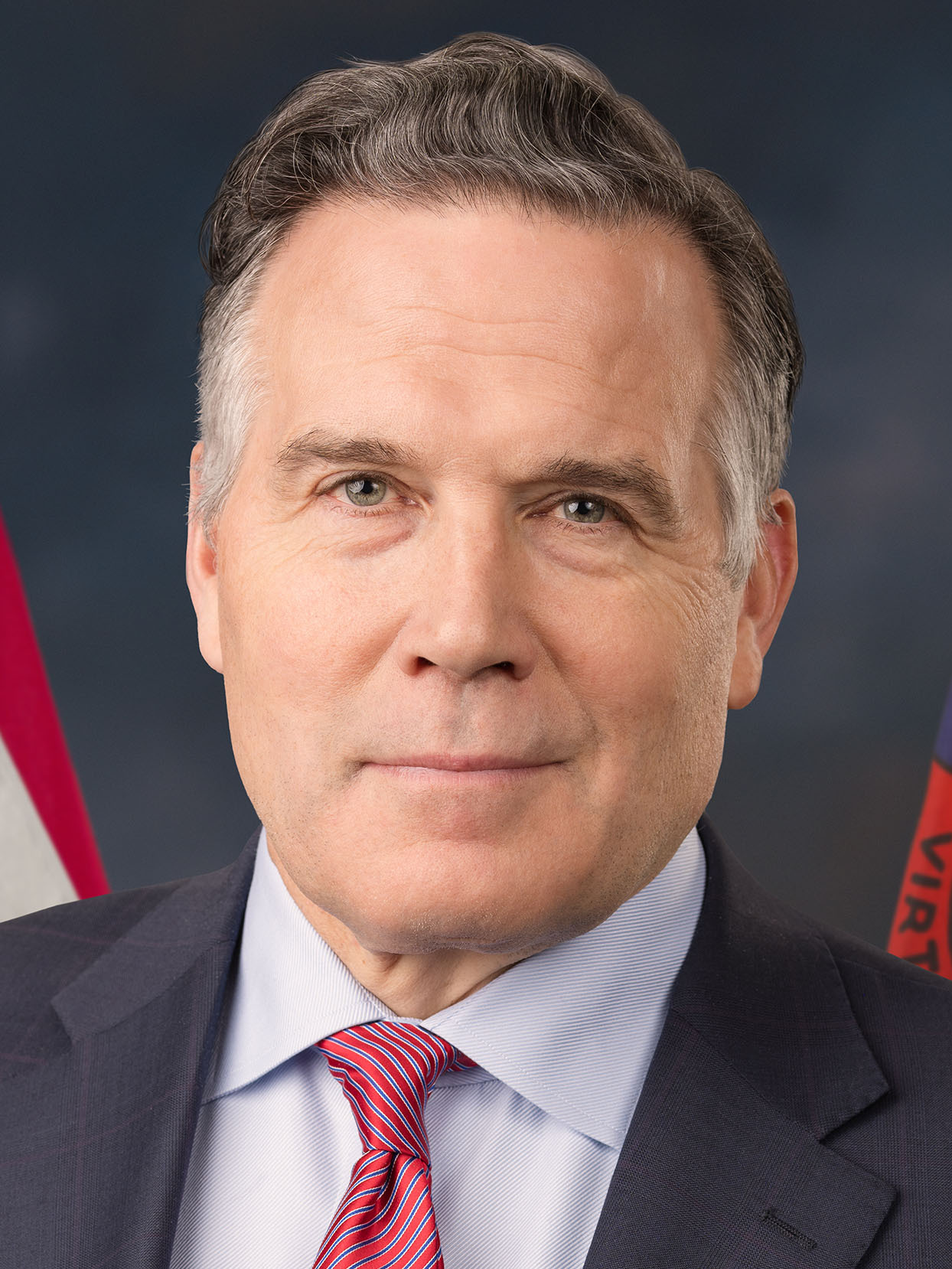
Former U.S. Treasury Under Secretary and future U.S. Senator David McCormick narrowly lost the primary, placing second.

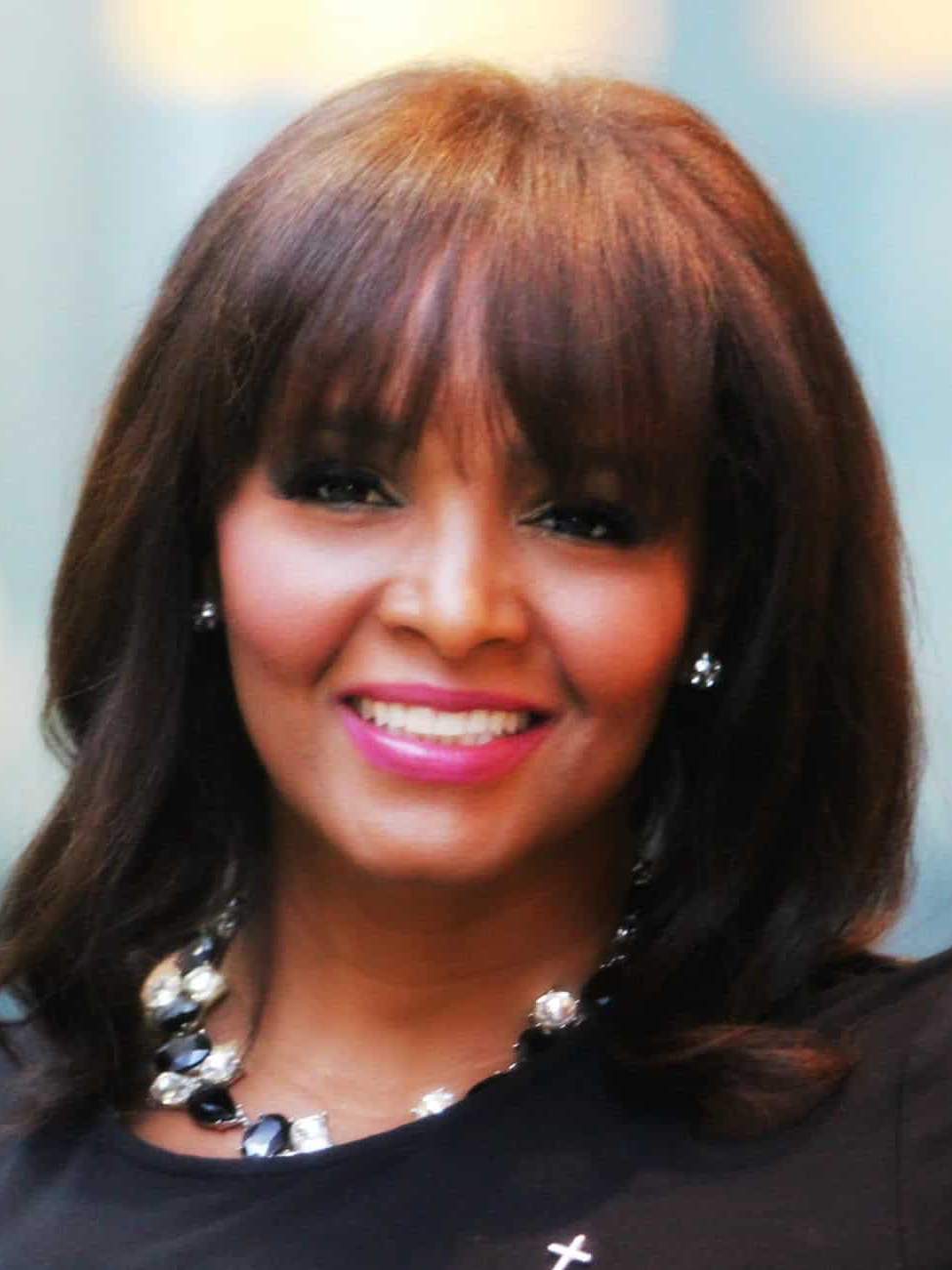
Author Kathy Barnette finished third in the primary.

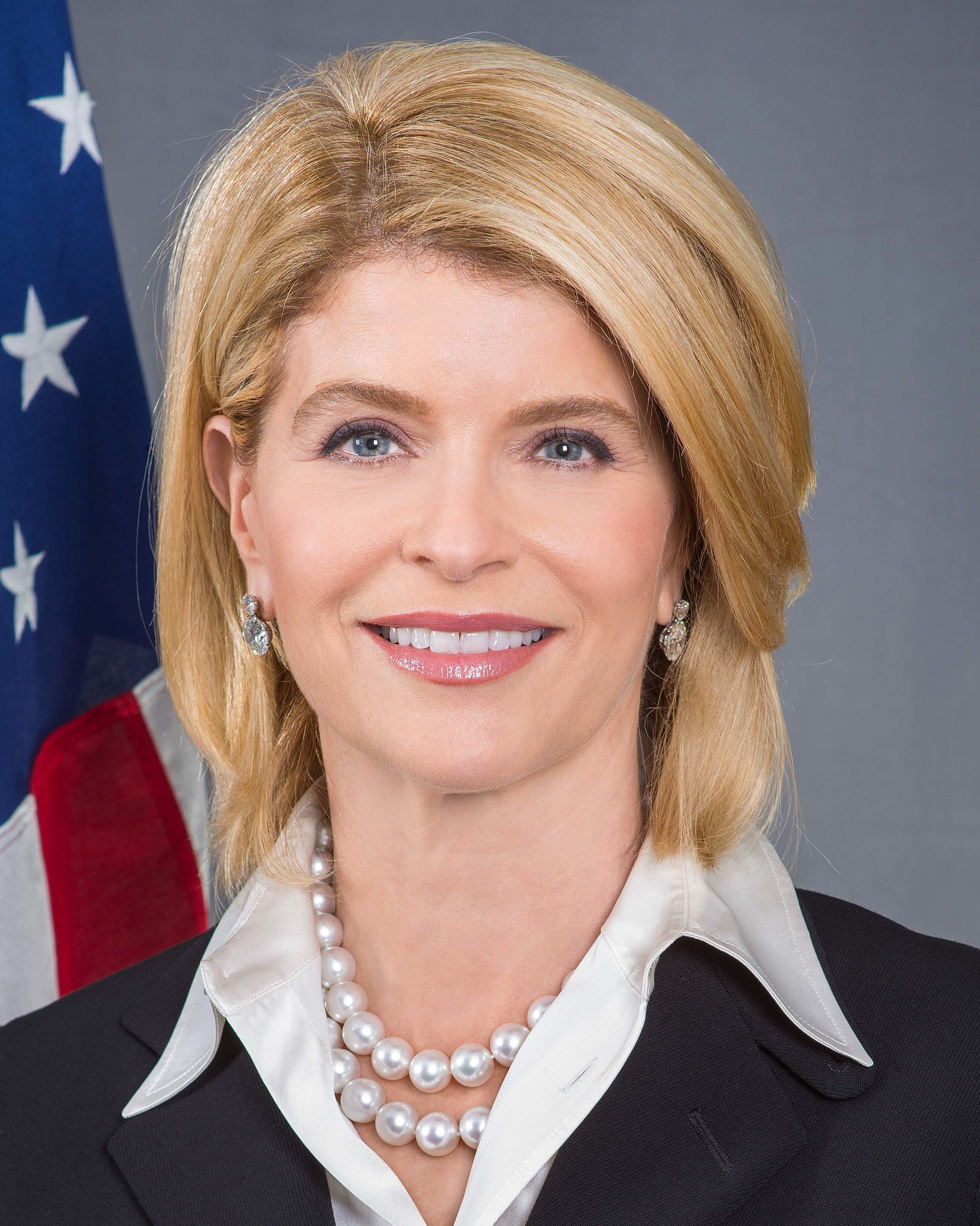
Former U.S. Ambassador to Denmark Carla Sands finished fourth in the primary.

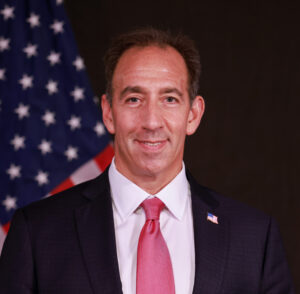
Businessman Jeff Bartos finished fifth in the primary.

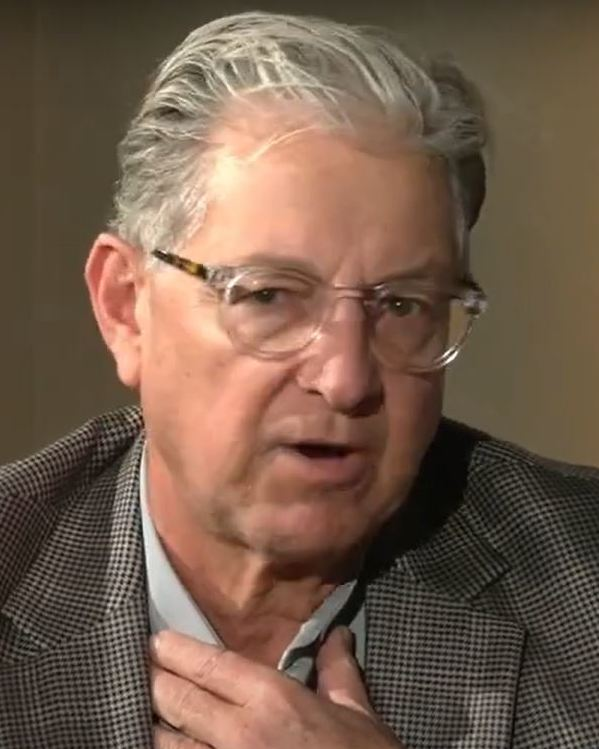
Former Pennsylvania Boxing Commissioner George Bochetto finished seventh in the primary.

=== Campaign ===
==== Early campaign ====
In October 2020, incumbent Republican Senator Pat Toomey decided not to run for re-election, stating that he wished to return to the private sector.

By October 2021, businessman Jeff Bartos, who had posted strong fund-raising totals, and veteran Sean Parnell, who had the endorsement of former president Donald Trump, emerged as the race's front-runners. However, Parnell's campaign faced a large scandal in November 2021, after his ex-wife, Laurie Snell, testified in court during a custody hearing for the couple's children that Parnell had strangled and spat on her, abused their children, and told her to "go get an abortion". Parnell denied the allegations under oath. Even before these allegations were made, doubts had arisen among Republicans regarding Parnell's fundraising ability, and it became widely assumed that he would suspend his campaign if he did not win custody of his children. On November 22, 2021, Snell was given custody of the couple's children and Parnell suspended his campaign.

==== Entry of Oz and McCormick ====
On November 30, with Parnell out of the race, Mehmet Oz, a celebrity doctor and television personality, announced his candidacy. Oz's campaign entered an immediate controversy over whether Oz himself was a resident of Pennsylvania, as he had lived in Cliffside Park, New Jersey, for most of his life and had only registered to vote in Pennsylvania in October 2020. The January 2022 entrance of David McCormick, a businessman, into the race prompted attacks for McCormick's past detraction of Trump and criticism of "America First" economic policies from Oz allies. Super PACs allied to McCormick hit back with a spate of well-funded television advertisements, accusing Oz of being a "Hollywood liberal."

Republican straw polls in January 2022 indicated strong support for Bartos and political commentator Kathy Barnette among party activists as the campaign started to escalate. Bartos won the Republican State Committee Central Caucus's straw poll, placing first with 49 votes, while Barnette finished in second place with 30 votes. McCormick and Sands trailed at third and fourth place; and Oz and former Boxing Commissioner George Bochetto performed poorly, each receiving only one vote. Despite this, political commentators largely considered Oz and McCormick to be the frontrunners, with the other candidates trailing them.

The McCormick campaign targeted Oz's ties to Turkey and called on him to renounce his Turkish citizenship, accusing Oz of harboring dual loyalties. Oz later stated that if he were elected to the Senate, he would renounce his Turkish citizenship. Former president Trump endorsed Oz on April 10, citing the popularity of his television show and perceived appeal to female voters. Oz frequently highlighted this endorsement, it becoming one of his major talking points during the campaign.

==== Late campaign ====
Oz had been ahead of the other candidates in the polls since the start of his campaign, with McCormick soon rising quickly in the polls to challenge Oz, with both men polling the low 20s. Barnette had also begun to rise in the polls at this point after a string of attention-getting debate performances and an ad spend in support of her by the Club for Growth. Her late surge prompted a change in tactics from the two frontrunners, who had largely ignored her as irrelevant until then. Pro-Oz Super PAC American Leadership Action launched an ad campaign accusing Barnette of supporting Black Lives Matter, while McCormick stated that Barnette was unelectable, citing her heavy loss in a U.S. House race the previous election cycle. Oz himself also accused Barnette of Islamophobia, pointing to a 2015 tweet in which she stated, "Pedophilia is a Cornerstone of Islam."

=== Candidates ===
==== Nominee ====
- Mehmet Oz, host of The Dr. Oz Show and former cardiologist

==== Eliminated in primary ====
- Kathy Barnette, Armed Forces Reserves veteran, author, political commentator on Fox News, and 2020 nominee to represent Pennsylvania's fourth district in the U.S. House of Representatives
- Jeff Bartos, businessman, philanthropist and nominee for lieutenant governor in 2018
- George Bochetto, Pennsylvania state boxing commissioner (1996–2002)
- Sean Gale, candidate for the Montgomery County Commission in 2019
- Dave McCormick, U.S. under secretary of the treasury for international affairs (2007–2009) and CEO of Bridgewater Associates (2020–2022)
- Carla Sands, U.S. ambassador to Denmark (2017–2021)

==== Disqualified ====
- John Debellis, small business owner
- John Eichenberg, truck driver
- Robert Jeffries, perennial candidate
- Ron Johnson, former Fredonia borough councilor (ran as the Constitution nominee)
- Richard Mulholland, HVAC technician
- Max Richardson
- Martin Rosenfeld, Elk County deputy sheriff and treasurer of the Elk County Republican Party
- David Xu, U.S. Army veteran, college professor and IT business owner

==== Withdrew ====
- Sean Parnell, U.S. Army veteran, author, and nominee for PA-17 in 2020 (endorsed McCormick)
- Craig Snyder, former chief of staff to U.S. Senator Arlen Specter
- Everett Stern, whistleblower, private intelligence agency owner, and candidate for PA-13 in 2014 and U.S. Senate in 2016 (ran as an independent)

==== Declined ====
- Kenneth Braithwaite, U.S. secretary of the Navy (2020–2021), U.S. ambassador to Norway (2018–2020), and former advisor to U.S. Senator Arlen Specter
- Mike Kelly, U.S. representative for PA-16; formerly PA-03 (2011–present) (endorsed Parnell)
- Paul Mango, deputy chief of staff for Policy at the U.S. Department of Health and Human Services (2019–2021), and candidate for governor in 2018
- Keith Rothfus, U.S. representative for PA-12 (2013–2019)
- Kiron Skinner, Taube Professor of International Relations and Politics at Carnegie Mellon University and former director of Policy Planning at the U.S. State Department (2018–2019)
- Pat Toomey, incumbent U.S. senator
- Donald Trump Jr., businessman and son of former president Donald Trump (endorsed Parnell)

=== Debates and forums ===
2022 Pennsylvania Senate election Republican primary debates
No.	Date	Host	Moderator	Link	Participants							
Key: P Participant A Absent N Non-invitee I Invitee W Withdrawn												
Key: P Participant A Absent N Non-invitee I Invitee W Withdrawn					Kathy Barnette	George Bochetto	Jeff Bartos	Sean Gale	David McCormick	Mehmet Oz	Carla Sands	Everett Stern
1	Feb. 22, 2022	BroadandLiberty.com; Pennsylvania Chamber of Business & Industry	Becky Corbin	Video	P	P	P	N	A	A	A	P
2	Apr. 25, 2022	Nexstar/WHTM-TV; WPXI	Dennis Owens; Lisa Sylvester	Video	P	N	P	N	P	P	P	W
3	May 4, 2022	Newsmax TV	Greta Van Susteren; Rick Dayton		P	N	P	N	P	P	P	W

=== Endorsements ===
Kathy Barnette

Executive branch officials

- Michael Flynn, national security advisor (2017) (formerly Democratic)
- Sebastian Gorka, deputy assistant to the president (2017)

U.S. senators

- Joni Ernst, Iowa (2015–present)

U.S. representatives

- Burgess Owens, Utah's 4th congressional district (2021–present)
- Scott Perry, PA-10 (2013–present)

State legislators

- Cris Dush, state senator from the 25th district (2021–present)
- Vernon Jones, Georgia state representative (1993–2001, 2017–2021)
- Doug Mastriano, state senator for the 33rd district (2019–present)

Organizations

- Club for Growth
- Gun Owners of America
- Pennsylvania State Police Fraternal Order of Police Pioneer Lodge #37
- Republican National Hispanic Assembly
- Susan B. Anthony List

Newspapers and other media

- Gab, alt-tech social media website

Individuals

- Jack Brewer, NFL player
- Tomi Lahren, conservative political commentator and television host
- John Ratzenberger, actor
Jeff Bartos

U.S. representatives

- ~~Fred Keller, U.S. representative for PA-12 (2019–2023)~~ (switched endorsement to Oz)

Statewide officials

- Stacy Garrity, Pennsylvania treasurer (2021–present)

State senators

- Ryan Aument, 36th district (2015–2024)
- Wayne Langerholc, 35th district (2017–present)
- Dan Laughlin, 49th district (2017–present)
- Scott Martin, 13th district (2017–present)
- Bob Mensch, 24th district (2009–2022), 147th district (2007–2009)
- Patrick Stefano, 32nd district (2015–present)
- Scott Wagner, 28th district (2014–2018), Republican nominee for Governor in 2018
- Judy Ward, 30th district; formerly the 80th (2015–present)

State representatives

- Torren Ecker, 193rd district (2019–present)
- Sue Helm, 104th district (2007–2022)
- John D. Hershey, 82nd district (2018–2023)
- R. Lee James, 64th district (2013–present)
- Barry Jozwiak, 5th district (2015–present)
- Dawn Keefer, 92nd district (2015–2024)
- Jack Rader, 176th district (2015–present)
- Frank Ryan, 101st district (2017–2023)
- Tommy Sankey, 73rd district; formerly the 74th (2013–2022)
- Jesse Topper, 78th district (2014–present)

Organizations

- BIPAC

Individuals

- John Arnold, philanthropist and founder of Arnold Ventures LLC
- Kenneth Langone, billionaire businessman, investor, and philanthropist
- Ross Perot Jr., real-estate developer
George Bochetto

Judges

- Sandra Schultz Newman, Pennsylvania Supreme Court justice (1996–2006)

Labor unions

- Fraternal Order of Police Philadelphia – Lodge #5
Robert Jeffries

Individuals

- Roger Stone, political consultant and lobbyist
Dave McCormick

Executive branch officials

- Gary Cohn, director of the National Economic Council (2017–2018) (Democratic)
- Emil Henry, assistant secretary for financial institutions (2005–2007)
- Hope Hicks, counselor to the president (2020–2021), White House communications director (2017–2018), White House director of strategic communications (2017)
- Larry Kudlow, director of the National Economic Council
- Robert Lighthizer, U.S. trade representative (2017–2021)
- Justin Muzinich, U.S. deputy secretary of the treasury (2018–2021)
- Mike Pompeo, U.S. secretary of state (2018–2021), director of the CIA (2017–2018), and U.S. representative for Kansas's 4th congressional district (2011–2017)
- Dina Powell, U.S. deputy national security advisor for Strategy (2017–2018), assistant secretary of state for educational and cultural affairs (2005–2007), director of the White House Presidential Personnel Office (2003–2005) (McCormick's wife)

U.S. senators

- Ted Cruz, Texas (2013–present) and candidate for president of the United States in 2016
- Rick Santorum, Pennsylvania (1995–2007)
- Dan Sullivan, Alaska (2015–present)

U.S. governors

- Mike Huckabee, governor of Arkansas (1996–2007)

U.S. representatives

- Dan Meuser, PA-09 (2019–present)
- Elise Stefanik, New York's 21st congressional district (2015–present)
- Glenn Thompson, PA-16; formerly PA-05 (2009–present)

Local officials

- Joel Klein, New York City Schools chancellor (2002–2011), United States assistant attorney general for the Antitrust Division (1996–2000), deputy White House counsel (1993–1995) (Democratic)

Labor unions

- National Border Patrol Council

Individuals

- Stanley Druckenmiller, lead investor for the Quantum Fund and hedge fund manager
- William Ford, chairman and CEO of General Atlantic
- Kenneth Griffin, hedge fund manager and CEO of Citadel LLC
- Hugh Hewitt, radio host, commentator
- Paul Tudor Jones, hedge fund manager (Independent)
- John F. W. Rogers, executive vice president, chief of staff and secretary to the board of Goldman Sachs
- Stephen Scharzman, chairman and CEO of The Blackstone Group
- Dan Senor, political advisor to Mitt Romney
Mehmet Oz

U.S. presidents

- Donald Trump, 45th president of the United States (2017–2021) (previously endorsed Parnell)

Executive branch officials

- Ben Carson, U.S. secretary of housing and urban development (2017–2021)
- Rick Perry, U.S. secretary of energy (2017–2019) and governor of Texas (2000–2015)
- Ryan Zinke, United States secretary of the interior (2017–2019) and U.S. representative from Montana's at-large congressional district (2015–2017)

U.S. representatives

- Fred Keller, PA-12 (2019–2023) (previously endorsed Bartos)
- Lloyd Smucker, PA-11; formerly PA-16 (2017–present)

Statewide officials

- Sean Reyes, attorney general of Utah (2013–2025)

Individuals

- Shmuley Boteach, Orthodox Jewish rabbi, author, and TV host
- Sean Hannity, conservative political commentator
- Ted Nugent, musician and activist
Carla Sands

Executive branch officials

- Frank Baxter, U.S. ambassador to Uruguay (2006–2009)
- Robin Bernstein, U.S. ambassador to the Dominican Republic (2018–2021)
- Ulrich Brechbuhl, counselor of the U.S. Department of State (2018–2021)
- David Cornstein, U.S. ambassador to Hungary (2018–2020)
- Randy Evans, U.S. ambassador to Luxembourg (2018–2021)
- David M. Friedman, U.S. ambassador to Israel (2017–2021)
- Callista Gingrich, U.S. ambassador to the Holy See (2017–2021)
- George Edward Glass, U.S. ambassador to Portugal (2017–2021)
- Pete Hoekstra, U.S. ambassador to the Netherlands (2018–2021) and U.S. representative for Michigan's 2nd congressional district (1993–2011)
- W. Robert Kohorst, U.S. ambassador to Croatia (2018–2021)
- Lana Marks, U.S. ambassador to South Africa (2019–2021)
- Jamie McCourt, U.S. ambassador to France and Monaco (2017–2021)
- Ed McMullen, U.S. ambassador to Switzerland and Liechtenstein (2017–2021)
- Robert O'Brien, national security advisor (2019–2021)
- Robert Pence, U.S. ambassador to Finland (2018–2021)
- Adrian Zuckerman, U.S. ambassador to Romania (2019–2021)

U.S. senators

- Scott Brown, 19th United States ambassador to New Zealand and Samoa (2017–2020) and U.S. senator from Massachusetts (2010–2013)

U.S. representatives

- Newt Gingrich, U.S. representative from Georgia's 6th congressional district (1979–1999) and 50th Speaker of the U.S. House of Representatives (1995–1999)

State legislators

- Matt Baker, speaker pro tempore of the Pennsylvania House of Representatives (2011–2018), state representative from the 68th district (1993–2018)
- David Maloney, state representative from the 130th district (2011–present)
- Greg Rothman, state representative from the 87th district (2015–2022)
Sean Parnell (withdrawn)

U.S. presidents

- ~~Donald Trump, 45th president of the United States (2017–2021)~~ (switched endorsement to Oz after Parnell withdrew)

U.S. senators

- Josh Hawley, Missouri (2019–present)

U.S. representatives

- Dan Crenshaw, Texas's 2nd congressional district (2019–present)
- Ronny Jackson, Texas's 13th congressional district (2021–present)
- Mike Kelly, PA-16; formerly PA-03 (2011–present)
- ~~Guy Reschenthaler, PA-14 (2019–present)~~ (switched endorsement to Oz after Parnell withdrew)

Individuals

- Donald Trump Jr., businessman and son of President Donald Trump
Craig Snyder (withdrawn)

Executive branch officials

- Bill Kristol, chief of staff to the vice president (1989–1993), founder of The Weekly Standard, and editor of The Bulwark (Democrat)
- Miles Taylor, chief of staff to the secretary of Homeland Security (2019)

U.S. representatives

- James Greenwood, PA-08 (1993–2005)
- Joe Walsh, Illinois's 8th congressional district (2011–2013) (Independent)
Declined to endorse

Organizations

- Pennsylvania Republican Party

Newspapers and other media

- The Philadelphia Inquirer

=== Polling ===
Graphical summary

View source data.

Source of poll aggregation	Dates administered	Dates updated	Kathy Barnette	Jeff Bartos	Dave McCormick	Mehmet Oz	Carla Sands	Other (Note: Calculated by taking the difference of 100% and all other candidates combined.)	Margin
Real Clear Politics	May 3–16, 2022	May 17, 2022	24.2%	5.4%	19.6%	26.8%	6.0%	18.0%	Oz +2.6

Poll source	Date(s) administered	Sample size (Note: Key: A – all adults RV – registered voters LV – likely voters V – unclear)	Margin of error	Kathy Barnette	Jeff Bartos	Dave McCormick	Mehmet Oz	Sean Parnell	Carla Sands	Other	Undecided
The Trafalgar Group (R)	May 14–16, 2022	1,195 (LV)	± 2.9%	27%	7%	22%	29%	–	7%	4% (Note: Bochetto and Gale with 2%)	6%
Emerson College	May 14–15, 2022	1,000 (LV)	± 3.0%	24%	5%	21%	28%	–	6%	1% (Note: Bochetto with 1%, Gale with 0%)	15%
Susquehanna Polling & Research (R)	May 12–15, 2022	400 (LV)	± 4.9%	27%	2%	11%	28%	–	3%	3% (Note: Bochetto, Gale, and "Other" with 1%)	26%
Osage Research (R) (Note: Poll sponsored by Honor Pennsylvania PAC, which supports McCormick.)	May 12–13, 2022	1,000 (LV)	± 3.1%	24%	6%	25%	24%	–	7%	1% (Note: Bochetto with 1%)	13%
InsiderAdvantage (R)	May 7–9, 2022	750 (LV)	± 3.6%	21%	5%	19%	23%	–	5%	3% (Note: Bochetto and Gale with 1%)	26%
The Trafalgar Group (R)	May 6–8, 2022	1,080 (LV)	± 3.0%	23%	7%	22%	25%	–	7%	2%	15%
Fox News	May 3–7, 2022	1,001 (LV)	± 3.0%	19%	7%	20%	22%	–	8%	4% (Note: Gale with 2%, Bochetto and "Other" (volunteered response) with 1%)	18%
Franklin & Marshall College	April 20 – May 1, 2022	325 (RV)	± 6.9%	12%	2%	16%	18%	–	5%	6% (Note: "Someone else" with 5%, Gale with 1%, Bochetto with 0%)	39%
The Trafalgar Group (R)	April 11–13, 2022	1,074 (LV)	± 3.0%	18%	8%	20%	23%	–	11%	3% (Note: Bochetto with 3%, Gale with 1%)	17%
Franklin & Marshall College	March 30 – April 10, 2022	317 (RV)	± 6.6%	7%	6%	15%	16%	–	5%	8% (Note: "Someone else" with 6%, Bochetto with 2%, Gale with 0%)	43%
Eagle Consulting Group (R)	April 7–9, 2022	502 (LV)	± 4.4%	9%	6%	18%	11%	–	9%	2% (Note: Bochetto and Gale with ≤1%)	45%
Emerson College	April 3–4, 2022	1,000 (LV)	± 3.0%	10%	9%	18%	17%	–	8%	6% (Note: Bochetto with 4%, Gale with 3%)	33%
Public Opinion Strategies (R)	March 29 – April 3, 2022	600 (LV)	± 4.0%	13%	8%	22%	16%	–	11%	1%	–
Emerson College	March 26–28, 2022	372 (LV)	± 5.0%	6%	5%	14%	14%	–	6%	3% (Note: Bochetto with 2%, Gale with 1%)	51%
Basswood Research (R) (Note: Poll sponsored by Oz's campaign.)	March 19–21, 2022	800 (LV)	± 3.5%	11%	5%	22%	25%	–	13%	1%	23%
Fox News	March 2–6, 2022	960 (LV)	± 3.0%	9%	9%	24%	15%	–	6%	3% (Note: Bochetto, Stern, and "Other" (volunteered response) with 1%)	31%
Franklin & Marshall College	February 21–27, 2022	178 (LV)	± 10.1%	6%	4%	13%	10%	–	11%	3%	53%
Public Opinion Strategies (R)	~February 23, 2022	– (LV)	–	9%	5%	24%	18%	–	11%	1%	–
McLaughlin & Associates (R) (Note: Poll sponsored by McCormick's campaign.)	February 16–18, 2022	600 (LV)	± 4.0%	–	–	24%	18%	–	–	31%	27%
Osage Research (R)	February 13–16, 2022	825 (LV)	± 4.0%	7%	6%	24%	21%	–	11%	3%	28%
Public Opinion Strategies (R)	~February 9, 2022	– (LV)	–	9%	5%	17%	23%	–	17%	1%	–
The Trafalgar Group (R)	February 1–4, 2022	1,070 (LV)	± 3.0%	9%	7%	16%	27%	–	15%	6% (Note: Bochetto, Gale, and Stern with 2%)	22%
Osage Research (R)	January 31 – February 2, 2022	– (LV)	–	–	–	19%	29%	–	–	–	–
Public Opinion Strategies (R)	~January 6, 2022	– (LV)	–	9%	8%	13%	31%	–	12%	–	–
The Trafalgar Group (R)	December 13–16, 2021	1,062 (LV)	± 3.0%	8%	3%	–	19%	–	7%	12% (Note: "Another Candidate" with 11%, Gale with 1%)	51%
Echelon Insights (R)	December 1–3, 2021	200 (LV)	± 6.9%	7%	4%	–	11%	–	5%	10% (Note: Gale with 4%; Jeffries with 2%; Xu with 1%; Stern with 0%)	63%
	November 22, 2021	Parnell withdraws from the race									
Civiqs (D)	October 31 – November 5, 2021	799 (LV)	± 3.5%	7%	6%	–	–	31%	8%	2% (Note: Gale with 2%)	54%
Franklin & Marshall College	October 18–24, 2021	184 (RV)	± 8.8%	3%	2%	–	–	11%	2%	3% (Note: "Someone else" with 3%, Gale with 0%)	78%
OnMessage Inc. (R) (Note: Poll sponsored by Parnell's campaign.)	October 11–14, 2021	500 (LV)	± 4.4%	–	7%	–	–	27%	4%	5%	57%
Franklin & Marshall College	August 9–15, 2021	154 (RV)	± 10.9%	6%	4%	–	–	14%	1%	10% (Note: "Someone else" with 7%, Gale with 3%)	66%

=== Results ===
Following the first night of results, it became clear that Oz and McCormick were the top two vote-getters in the election; however, the margin between them was too close to declare a victor. A mandatory recount then began. Former president Trump encouraged Oz to declare victory on election night, stating that Oz would only be defeated as a result of election fraud; these claims were noted by Politico as echoing Trump's baseless claims of election fraud in the 2020 presidential election. With McCormick having done better with mail-in ballots, Oz opposed counting ballots which were received by election offices before election day but were missing dates on the envelopes. A state court later required counties to count undated ballots as valid.

On June 3, McCormick conceded to Oz, saying he could not make up the deficit in the recount.

Results by county: Oz: 20–30%; 30–40%; 40–50%; McCormick: 20–30%; 30–40%; 40–50%; Barnette: 30–40%

Republican primary results
Party	Candidate	Votes	%
Republican	Mehmet Oz	420,168	31.21%
Republican	Dave McCormick	419,218	31.14%
Republican	Kathy Barnette	331,903	24.66%
Republican	Carla Sands	73,360	5.45%
Republican	Jeff Bartos	66,684	4.95%
Republican	Sean Gale	20,266	1.51%
Republican	George Bochetto	14,492	1.08%
Total votes		1,346,091	100.0%

== Democratic primary ==
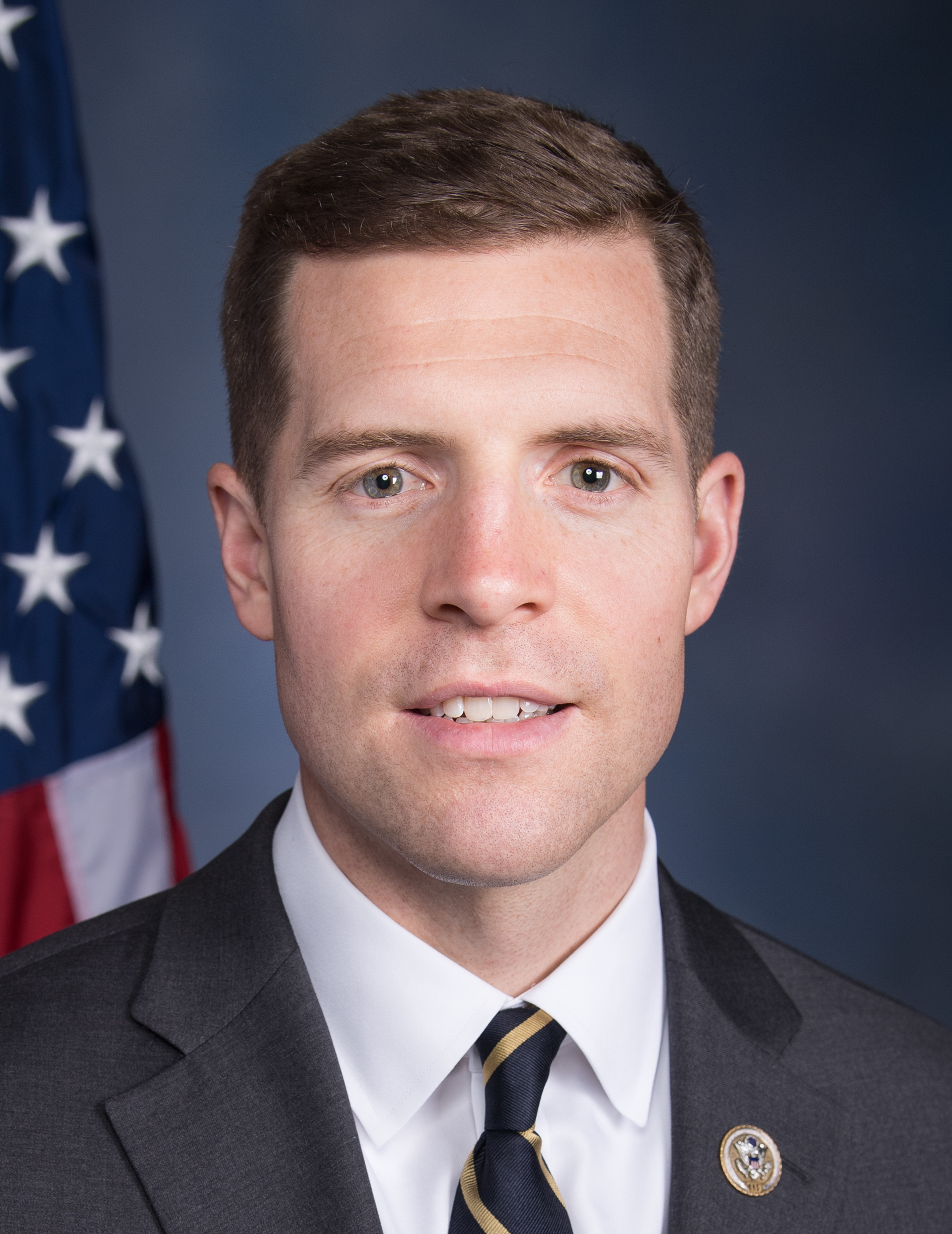
U.S. Representative Conor Lamb finished second in the primary.

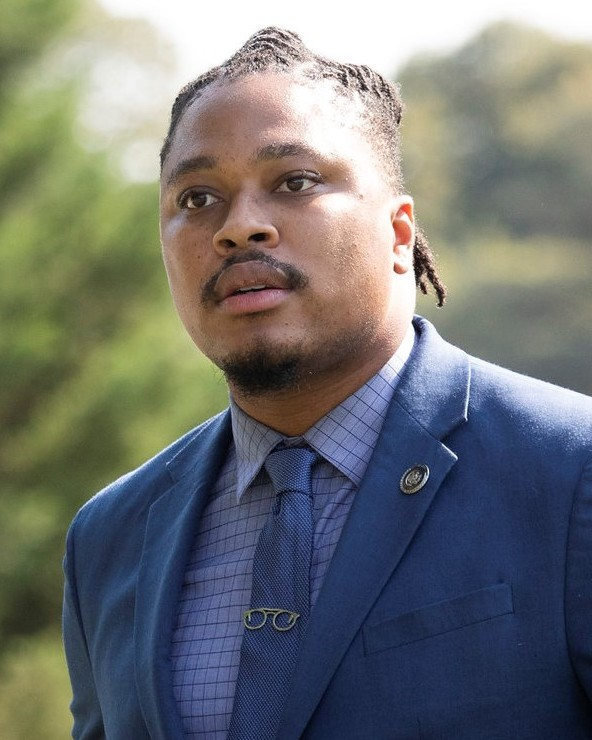
State Representative Malcolm Kenyatta finished third in the primary.

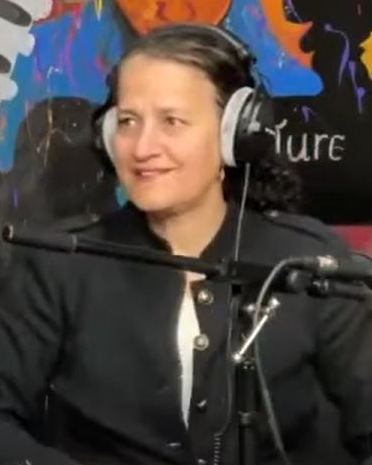
Jenkintown Borough Councilor Alexandra Khalil finished fourth in the primary.

=== Campaign ===
The first two major Democratic candidates were Lieutenant Governor of Pennsylvania John Fetterman and state representative Malcolm Kenyatta. Both Fetterman and Kenyatta were considered to be staunchly progressive Democrats, but the two men were felt to appeal to different demographics. By July 2021, Fetterman was considered the frontrunner as a result of his high name recognition and strong fundraising. U.S. Representative Conor Lamb, a moderate Democrat, entered the race on August 6, 2021.

As the campaign progressed, Lamb and Fetterman became the two most prominent candidates, with Kenyatta and Montgomery County Commissioner Val Arkoosh also receiving media attention. Fetterman had maintained his frontrunner status as of December, and the other three contenders were viewed as mainly competing with each other in order to claim the anti-Fetterman mantle. On February 4, 2022, Arkoosh withdrew from the race, her campaign having previously suffered from poor poll results and low support from party activists, leaving Kenyatta as the only major candidate from the Philadelphia region. Both Kenyatta and Lamb were considered to have a good chance at picking up voters who had previously supported Arkoosh, Lamb for ideological reasons and Kenyatta for geographical ones.

In addition to Fetterman, Kenyatta, and Lamb, two minor candidates also made the Democratic primary ballot, namely Kevin Baumlin, a hospital physician, and Alexandra Khalil, a municipal official. Baumlin withdrew from the race on March 31, leaving only Khalil in addition to the three major candidates.

Lamb received the assistance of the “Penn Progress” Super PAC, which spent the entirety of its funds in support of Lamb's campaign. Lamb worked closely with the Super PAC, and participated in donor calls it arranged. The Penn Progress Super PAC bankrolled TV ads which sought to portray Fetterman as a "self-described democratic socialist." Within a day of airing, PolitiFact and Factcheck.org called the attack ad false, The Philadelphia Inquirer commented that Fetterman had never actually described himself that way, the ABC affiliate in Philadelphia stopped broadcasting the ad, and Senator Elizabeth Warren called on Lamb to disavow it.

=== Candidates ===
==== Nominee ====
- John Fetterman, lieutenant governor of Pennsylvania (2019–2023), former mayor of Braddock (2005–2019) and candidate for the U.S. Senate in 2016

==== Eliminated in primary ====
- Malcolm Kenyatta, state representative for the 181st district (2019–present)
- Alexandria Khalil, Jenkintown borough councilor (2019–present)
- Conor Lamb, U.S. representative for PA-17, formerly PA-18 (2018–2023)

==== Disqualified ====
- Kael Dougherty, data operations associate
- Larry Johnson, attorney
- Alan Shank, retail worker
- Walter Sluzynsky, postal worker
- Lew Tapera, retail worker

==== Withdrew ====
- Val Arkoosh, member of the Montgomery County Board of Commissioners (2014–2023) and physician
- Kevin Baumlin, chief of Emergency and Urgent Care Services at Pennsylvania Hospital
- John McGuigan, former president of the Norristown Municipal Council (1994–1997)
- Eric Orts, professor at the Wharton School at the University of Pennsylvania (endorsed Kenyatta)
- Sharif Street, state senator for the 3rd district (2017–present), vice chair of the Pennsylvania Democratic Party, son of former mayor of Philadelphia John Street (endorsed Lamb)

==== Declined ====
- Brendan Boyle, U.S. representative for PA-02; formerly PA-13 (2015–present)
- Madeleine Dean, U.S. representative for PA-04 (2019–present) (ran for re-election)
- Eugene DePasquale, Pennsylvania auditor general (2013–2021) and nominee for PA-10 in 2020
- Chrissy Houlahan, U.S. representative for PA-06 (2019–present) (ran for re-election)
- Jim Kenney, mayor of Philadelphia (2016–2024) (endorsed Lamb)
- Joe Sestak, U.S. representative for PA-07 (2007–2011), former Vice Admiral of the U.S. Navy, nominee for U.S. Senate in 2010, candidate for U.S. Senate in 2016, and candidate for president in 2020
- Josh Shapiro, Pennsylvania attorney general (2017–2023) (ran for governor)
- Joe Torsella, Pennsylvania state treasurer (2017–2021)
- Susan Wild, U.S. representative for PA-07; formerly PA-15 (2018–2025) (ran for re-election)

=== Debates ===
2022 Pennsylvania Senate election Democratic primary debates
No.	Date	Host	Moderator	Link	Participants		
Key: P Participant A Absent N Non-invitee I Invitee W Withdrawn							
Key: P Participant A Absent N Non-invitee I Invitee W Withdrawn					John Fetterman	Malcolm Kenyatta	Conor Lamb
1	Apr. 3, 2022	Muhlenberg College	Becky Corbin; Jenny DeHuff; Ari Mittleman	Video	A (Note: Fetterman was invited to the debate, but declined to attend)	P	P
2	Apr. 21, 2022	Nexstar/WHTM-TV; WPXI	Dennis Owens; Lisa Sylvester	Video	P	P	P

=== Endorsements ===
Val Arkoosh (withdrawn)

State senators

- Maria Collett, 12th district (2019–present)
- Judy Schwank, 11th district (2011–present)

State representatives

- Tim Briggs, 149th district (2009–present)
- ~~Joe Ciresi, 146th district (2019–present)~~ (switched endorsement to Lamb after Arkoosh withdrew)
- Mary Jo Daley, 148th district (2013–present)
- Pam DeLissio, 194th district (2011–2022)
- Leanne Krueger, 161st district (2015–present)
- ~~Steve Malagari, 53rd district (2019–present)~~ (switched endorsement to Lamb after Arkoosh withdrew)
- Ben Sanchez, 153rd district (2018–present)
- ~~Joe Webster, 150th district (2019–present)~~ (switched endorsement to Lamb after Arkoosh withdrew)

Organizations

- 314 Action
- EMILY's List
John Fetterman

Local officials

- Paige Cognetti, mayor of Scranton (2020–present)

Labor unions

- AFSCME – District Council 47
- American Postal Workers Union – Pennsylvania chapter
- United Food and Commercial Workers Local 1776
- United Steelworkers District 10

Organizations

- Council for a Livable World
- MarchOn
- National Organization for the Reform of Marijuana Laws

Newspapers and other media

- The Philadelphia Tribune (Democratic primary only)

Individuals

- Sean McElwee, activist and co-founder of Data for Progress
Malcolm Kenyatta

U.S. representatives

- Sharice Davids, Kansas's 3rd congressional district (2019–present)
- Al Green, Texas's 9th congressional district (2005–present)

State representatives

- Jessica Benham, 36th district (2021–present)
- Matthew Bradford, 70th district (2009–present)
- Donna Bullock, 195th district (2015–2024)
- Danilo Burgos, 197th district (2019–present)
- Nancy Guenst, 152nd district (2021–present)
- Joseph Hohenstein, 177th district (2019–present)
- Stephen Kinsey, 201st district (2013–2024)
- Maureen Madden, 115th district (2017–present)
- Jeanne McNeill, 133rd district (2018–present)

Local officials

- Kendra Brooks, at-large Philadelphia city councilor (2020–present) (Working Families Party)
- Jamie Gauthier, Philadelphia city councilor from District 3 (2020–present)
- Katherine Gilmore Richardson, at-large Philadelphia city councilor (2020–present)
- Mark Squilla, Philadelphia city councilor from District 1 (2020–present) (2012–present)
- Isaiah Thomas, at-large Philadelphia city councilor (2020–present)

Labor unions

- American Federation of State, County and Municipal Employees District Council #33
- American Federation of Teachers
- Service Employees International Union

Organizations

- Brand New Congress
- LGBTQ Victory Fund
- Democracy For America

Political parties

- Working Families Party

Individuals

- Lee Daniels, movie director, screenwriter, and movie producer
- Gloria Steinem, author, women's rights activist
Conor Lamb

U.S. representatives

- Bob Brady, PA-01 (1998–2019), chair of the Democratic Party of Philadelphia (1986–present)
- Matt Cartwright, PA-08; formerly PA-17 (2013–2025)
- Mike Doyle, PA-18; formerly PA-14 and PA-18 (1995–2022)
- Joe Neguse, Colorado's 2nd congressional district (2019–present)

State senators

- Jim Brewster, 45th district (2010–2024)
- Jay Costa, Democratic leader (2011–present) from the 43rd district (1996–present)
- Wayne Fontana, 42nd district (2005–present)
- Steve Santarsiero, 10th district (2019–present)
- Sharif Street, 3rd district (2017–present)

State representatives

- Ryan Bizzarro, 3rd district (2013–present)
- Amen Brown, 190th district (2021–present)
- Michael Carroll, 118th district (2007–2022)
- Joe Ciresi, 146th district (2019–present)
- Tina Davis, 141st district (2011–present)
- Dan Deasy, 27th district (2009–present)
- Frank Dermody, Democratic leader of the Pennsylvania House of Representatives (2011–2020) from the 33rd district (1990–2020)
- Dan Frankel, 23rd district (1999–present)
- Patrick Harkins, 1st district (2006–present)
- Kristine Howard, 167th district (2019–present)
- William Kortz, 38th district (2007–2021)
- Bridget Malloy Kosierowski, 114th district (2019–present)
- Anita Kulik, 45th district (2017–present)
- Mark Longietti, 7th district (2007–2022)
- Steve Malagari, 53rd district (2019–present)
- Robert Matzie, 16th district (2009–present)
- Robert Merski, 2nd district (2019–present)
- Dan Miller, 42nd district (2013–present)
- Gerald Mullery, 199th district (2011–2022)
- Kyle Mullins, 112th district (2018–present)
- Napoleon Nelson, 154th district (2021–present)
- Eddie Day Pashinski, 121st district (2007–present)
- Nick Pisciottano, 38th district (2021–2024)
- Mark Rozzi, 126th district (2013–2024)
- Pam Snyder, 50th District (2013–2022)
- Joe Webster, 150th district (2019–present)
- Jake Wheatley, 19th district (2003–2022)
- Dan Williams, 74th district (2019–present)

Local officials

- Ricky Burgess, Pittsburgh city councilor (2008–2024)
- Anthony Coghill, Pittsburgh city councilor (2018–present)
- Rich Fitzgerald, Allegheny County executive (2012–2024)
- Rick Gray, mayor of Lancaster (2006–2018)
- Curtis J. Jones Jr., Philadelphia city councilor from the 4th district (2008–present)
- Jim Kenney, mayor of Philadelphia (2016–2024)
- Thomas J. Murphy Jr., mayor of Pittsburgh (1994–2006)
- Corey O'Connor, Pittsburgh city councilor (2012–2022)
- J. William Reynolds, mayor of Bethlehem (2022–present)
- Jack Stollsteimer, Delaware County district attorney (2020–present)
- John Street, mayor of Philadelphia (2000–2008)
- Matthew Tuerk, mayor of Allentown (2022–present)

Labor unions

- American Federation of Government Employees
- American Federation of Teachers–Pittsburgh chapter
- Communications Workers of America
- International Association of Bridge, Structural, Ornamental and Reinforcing Iron Workers Local #3
- International Association of Heat and Frost Insulators and Allied Workers Local #2
- International Association of Machinists and Aerospace Workers Local #1044
- International Brotherhood of Electrical Workers Local #5, #98, #269, #654
- International Brotherhood of Teamsters Local #205
- International Union of Operating Engineers Local #66
- International Union of Painters and Allied Trades Local #21, #51
- Laborers' International Union of Eastern Pennsylvania
- Laborers' International Union of Western Pennsylvania
- Operative Plasterers' and Cement Masons' International Association Local #592
- Pennsylvania Association of Staff Nurses and Allied Professionals
- Philadelphia Building & Construction Trades Council
- Pittsburgh Firefighters IAFF
- Sheet Metal Workers' International Association Local #12
- United Mine Workers Association
- Utility Workers Union of America

Organizations

- National Organization for Women
- Philadelphia Democratic Party
- Stonewall Democrats PGH
- VoteVets.org

Newspapers and other media

- The Philadelphia Inquirer

Individuals

- Nina Ahmad, 2020 Democratic nominee for Pennsylvania auditor general
- James Carville, political consultant and head strategist of the 1992 Bill Clinton presidential campaign
- Steve Cozen, founder and chairman of the Philadelphia-based law firm Cozen O'Connor
Declined to endorse

Statewide officials

- Tom Wolf, 47th governor of Pennsylvania (2015–2023)

Organizations

- Pennsylvania Democratic Party (Note: Conor Lamb received the most delegate votes of 169, but failed to reach the self-imposed threshold of a two-thirds majority vote, meaning that no candidate received the endorsement of the Pennsylvania Democratic Party.)

=== Polling ===
Graphical summary

View source data.

Source of poll aggregation	Dates administered	Dates updated	John Fetterman	Malcolm Kenyatta	Conor Lamb	Other	Margin
Real Clear Politics	March 26 – May 1, 2022	May 5, 2022	43.0%	6.0%	12.0%	39.0%	Fetterman +31.0

Poll source	Date(s) administered	Sample size	Margin of error	Val Arkoosh	John Fetterman	Malcolm Kenyatta	Conor Lamb	Sharif Street	Other	Undecided
Franklin & Marshall College	April 20 – May 1, 2022	357 (RV)	± 6.6%	–	53%	4%	14%	–	6% (Note: "Someone else" with 4%; Baumlin and Khalil with 1%)	22%
Franklin & Marshall College	March 30 – April 10, 2022	356 (RV)	± 6.2%	–	41%	4%	17%	–	9% (Note: "Someone else" with 9%; Baumlin and Khalil with 0%)	26%
GBAO (D) (Note: Poll sponsored by Fetterman's campaign.)	April 5–7, 2022	600 (LV)	± 4.0%	–	44%	17%	19%	–	4% (Note: Khalil with 4%)	15%
Emerson College	March 26–28, 2022	471 (LV)	± 4.5%	–	33%	8%	10%	–	12% (Note: Baumlin with 9%; Khalil with 3%)	37%
Franklin & Marshall College	February 21–27, 2022	185 (LV)	± 9.9%	–	28%	2%	15%	–	7%	50%
Impact Research (D) (Note: Poll sponsored by pro-Lamb super PAC Penn Progress.)	Early February 2022	800 (LV)	± 3.5%	3%	47%	7%	17%	5%	8%	13%
	February 4, 2022	Arkoosh withdraws from the race								
Data for Progress (D)	January 26–31, 2022	730 (LV)	± 4.0%	4%	46%	12%	16%	–	–	22%
	January 19, 2022	Street withdraws from the race								
GQR Research (D) (Note: Poll sponsored by Kenyatta's campaign.)	December 14–16, 2021	600 (LV)	± 4.0%	6%	44%	20%	15%	–	2%	12%
GBAO (D)	November 16–23, 2021	800 (LV)	± 3.5%	5%	42%	15%	16%	–	–	21%
Civiqs (D)	October 31 – November 5, 2021	929 (LV)	± 3.2%	2%	52%	5%	12%	2%	6%	21%
Franklin & Marshall College	October 18–24, 2021	208 (RV)	± 8.2%	4%	34%	5%	12%	5%	3%	37%
Franklin & Marshall College	August 9–15, 2021	175 (RV)	± 10.2%	6%	33%	5%	12%	0%	3%	42%
Data for Progress (D)	May 7–14, 2021	302 (LV)	± 6.0%	5%	40%	9%	21%	2%	8% (Note: Houlahan with 8%)	14%

=== Results ===
Fetterman won the Democratic primary by a landslide, winning all 67 counties in Pennsylvania, with Lamb in second place. Lamb's loss was attributed by Vanity Fair to numerous reasons, such as his not being known to voters in the Philadelphia metropolitan area, where the majority of Democratic voters were located, while in contrast Fetterman's position as lieutenant governor gave him statewide name recognition. Lamb was often compared with conservative Democratic senators Joe Manchin and Kyrsten Sinema, whom Fetterman criticized harshly. However, Lamb also criticized the Senators and said that he would vote in favor of eliminating the filibuster in contrast to them. In addition, the far more contested Republican primary had consumed media attention that Lamb might have otherwise used to gain more name recognition. Fetterman was also widely considered to have run an effective populist campaign, with The Atlantic noting that his campaign focused on the issues of "workers, wages and weed".

Results by county Fetterman: 30–40%; 40–50%; 50–60%; 60–70%; 70–80%; 80–90%

Fetterman: 30–40%; 40–50%; 50–60%; 60–70%; 70–80%

Fetterman: 30–40%; 40–50%; 50–60%; 60–70%; 70–80%; 80–90%; Kenyatta: 40–50%

Fetterman: 30–40%; 40–50%; 50–60%; 60–70%; 70–80%; 80–90%; Kenyatta: 30–40%; 40–50%

Fetterman: 30–40%; 40–50%; 50–60%; 60–70%; 70–80%; 80–90%; >90%; Lamb: 40–50%; 50–60%; 60–70%; 70–80%; 80–90%; >90%; Kenyatta: 30–40%; 40–50%; 50–60%; Khalil: 60–70%; Tie: 30–40%; 40–50%; 50%; No votes

Democratic primary results
Party	Candidate	Votes	%
Democratic	John Fetterman	753,557	58.65%
Democratic	Conor Lamb	337,498	26.27%
Democratic	Malcolm Kenyatta	139,393	10.85%
Democratic	Alexandria Khalil	54,460	4.24%
Total votes		1,284,908	100.0%

== Libertarian convention ==
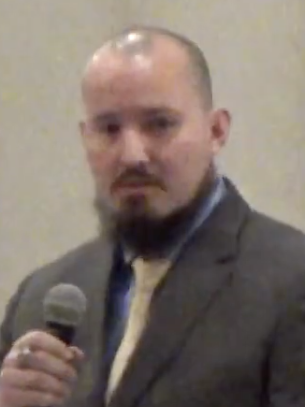
Libertarian nominee Erik Gerhardt

The Libertarian Party nominee qualified for the general election ballot on August 1.

=== Candidates ===
==== Nominee ====
- Erik Gerhardt, carpenter, small business owner, and candidate for president in 2020

==== Withdrew ====
- Steve Scheetz, powder coater and former chair of the Pennsylvania Libertarian Party (2013–2015, 2019–2021)

== Green convention ==
The Green Party nominee qualified for the general election ballot on August 1.

=== Candidates ===
==== Nominee ====
- Richard L. Weiss, lawyer, nominee for attorney general in 2020, and nominee for judge of the Allegheny County Court of Common Pleas in 2021

== Independents and other parties ==
=== Candidates ===
==== Qualified for ballot ====
- Dan Wassmer (Keystone nominee), lawyer and Libertarian nominee for attorney general in 2020

==== Declared write-in ====
- Ron Johnson (Constitution nominee), former Fredonia borough councilor (originally ran as a Republican)
- Quincy Magee, inspector of elections for Philadelphia's 44th ward

==== Withdrew ====
- Everett Stern, whistleblower, private intelligence agency owner, and Republican candidate for PA-13 in 2014 and U.S. Senate in 2016 (originally ran as a Republican, endorsed Fetterman)

== General election ==
=== Campaign ===
Fetterman's campaign framed Oz as a wealthy outsider who lived outside of Pennsylvania before 2020, including by airing ads that note his past residency in New Jersey. Fetterman also flew banners and published social media posts described by The Hill and The Washington Post as "trolling" his opponent. In one post, Fetterman started a petition to get Oz inducted to the New Jersey Hall of Fame. In response to the carpetbagging criticisms, Oz said during the primary debate that Pennsylvanians "care much more about what I stand for than where I'm from".

Oz's campaign criticized Fetterman for being inactive since he suffered a stroke in May and made an issue of Fetterman's health. In September, Oz published his medical records, which prompted Fetterman to state he was medically cleared to serve in the Senate. Oz's campaign also framed Fetterman as a socialist, highlighting his endorsement of Bernie Sanders in 2016. Fetterman countered that he has differences in policy proposals with Sanders in issues such as fracking.

Fetterman's refusal to debate Oz until late October was criticized by Oz's campaign. Fetterman attributed the delay in debating to lingering issues from his stroke and his team criticized debate concessions from Oz's team for allegedly mocking Fetterman's stroke recovery. A single debate was held on October 25.

==== Crudités video ====
On August 15, 2022, an April 2022 campaign video of Oz shopping in a Redner's Warehouse supermarket went viral. In the video, Oz says he is shopping for produce to make crudités and attributes the high prices to Democratic president Joe Biden.

The video was widely ridiculed on social media and was the subject of several news articles. Most observers focused on Oz's usage of the French term "crudités", his choice of items, and several factual errors; Fetterman himself replied saying that Pennsylvanians refer to crudités as "veggie trays". Oz's choice of a raw head of broccoli, asparagus, and multiple pounds of carrots, with guacamole and salsa, was criticized as wrong by some. Others expressed confusion at Oz's statement that the $20 cost of the vegetables and dips "doesn't even include the tequila", as tequila is not a traditional accompaniment to crudités and liquor is not sold in grocery stores in Pennsylvania. Many observers noted Oz quoted the wrong price tag for the salsa and falsely suggested the broccoli was $2 per head when it was $2 per pound.

The number of internet searches for crudités dramatically increased in the aftermath of the video's circulation. Oz appearing to confuse the Redner's and Wegmans supermarket chains led to the name "Wegner's" trending on Twitter and a parody Twitter account called "Wegner's Groceries" gaining popularity. The Fetterman campaign sought to capitalize on the video by introducing merchandise referencing it. When asked if the video made him unrelatable to voters, Oz emphasized he helped others throughout his career and would continue to help if elected.

==== Debate ====
In the October 25 debate, a special arrangement of transcription monitors was put in place to assist Fetterman with his auditory processing issue. According to the Associated Press, Fetterman "struggled at times to explain his positions and often spoke haltingly", with Fetterman facing issues completing sentences and frequently pausing after questions were asked. Oz was described as being "more at home on the debate stage" and presented himself as a moderate Republican, and did not reference Fetterman's health condition. Independent health experts said that Fetterman was recovering "remarkably well". Fetterman particularly struggled answering a question regarding his previous opposition to fracking by stating he always supported fracking, while Oz answered a question on abortion by saying that the federal government should have no role in states' abortion decisions, instead leaving abortion decisions to "women, doctors, [and] local political leaders".

According to Politico and The Guardian, Fetterman "struggled" during the debate, and some Democrats questioned why he chose to debate at all. After the debate, the Fetterman campaign claimed that the closed captioning system provided by Nexstar Media Group gave incorrect and slow captions. Nexstar denied the claims, arguing the captioning "worked as expected" and that the Fetterman team had had the opportunity for two rehearsals with the equipment and opted to only do one.

=== Predictions ===
Source	Ranking	As of
The Cook Political Report	Tossup	October 4, 2022
Inside Elections	Tossup	August 25, 2022
Sabato's Crystal Ball	Lean R	November 7, 2022
Politico	Tossup	June 8, 2022
RCP	Tossup	August 14, 2022
Fox News	Tossup	October 25, 2022
DDHQ	Tossup	October 15, 2022
538	Tossup	November 7, 2022
The Economist	Tossup	November 1, 2022

=== Debates ===
2022 United States Senate general election in Pennsylvania debates
No.	Date	Host	Moderator	Link	Republican	Democratic
Key: P Participant A Absent N Non-invitee I Invitee W Withdrawn						
Key: P Participant A Absent N Non-invitee I Invitee W Withdrawn					Mehmet Oz	John Fetterman
1	Oct. 25, 2022	Nexstar/WHTM-TV; WPXI	Dennis Owens; Lisa Sylvester	YouTube	P	P

=== Post-primary endorsements ===
Mehmet Oz (R)

Executive branch officials

- David Bernhardt, U.S. secretary of the interior (2019–2021)
- David Friedman, U.S. ambassador to Israel (2017–2021)
- Richard Grenell, special presidential envoy for Serbia and Kosovo Peace Negotiations (2019–2021), U.S. ambassador to Germany (2018–2020), acting director of National Intelligence (2020)
- Nikki Haley, United States ambassador to the United Nations (2017–2018) and governor of South Carolina (2011–2017)
- Steven Law, deputy secretary of labor (2003–2007)
- Dave McCormick, under secretary of the treasury (2007–2009), under secretary of commerce for industry and security (2005–2006), 2022 Republican candidate for Senate in Pennsylvania
- Tom Ridge, U.S. secretary of Homeland Security (2003–2005), United States Homeland Security advisor (2001–2003), Governor of Pennsylvania (1995–2001)
- Wilbur Ross, U.S. secretary of commerce (2017–2021)
- Carla Sands, U.S. ambassador to Denmark (2017–2021), 2022 Republican candidate for Senate in Pennsylvania
- Matt Schlapp, White House director of political affairs (2003–2005)
- Mercedes Schlapp, White House director of strategic communications (2017–2019)
- Jim Schultz, associate White House counsel (2017)

U.S. senators

- Susan Collins, Maine (1997–present)
- Tom Cotton, Arkansas (2015–present)
- Kevin Cramer, North Dakota (2019–present)
- John Kennedy, Louisiana (2017–present)
- Roger Marshall, Kansas (2021–present)
- Mitch McConnell, Kentucky (1985–present), Senate minority leader (2007–2015, 2021–2025), Senate majority leader (2015–2021)
- Rick Scott, Florida (2019–present)
- Tim Scott, South Carolina (2013–present)
- Pat Toomey, Pennsylvania (2011–2023)

U.S. representatives

- Brian Fitzpatrick, PA-01; formerly PA-08 (2017–present)
- Newt Gingrich, Georgia's 6th congressional district (1979-1999), speaker of the United States House of Representatives (1995–1999)
- John Joyce, PA-13 (2019–present)
- Mike Kelly, PA-16; formerly PA-03 (2011–present)
- Dan Meuser, PA-09 (2019–present)
- Scott Perry, PA-10 (2013–present)
- Guy Reschenthaler, PA-14 (2019–present)
- Glenn Thompson, PA-15; formerly PA-05 (2009–present)

Statewide officials

- Chris Christie, governor of New Jersey (2010–2018)
- Ron DeSantis, governor of Florida (2019–present)
- Stacy Garrity, Pennsylvania treasurer (2021–present)
- George Pataki, governor of New York (1995–2006)

State senators

- Lisa Baker, 20th district (2007–present)
- Cris Dush, 25th district (2020–present)
- Mike Regan, 31st district (2017–2024)
- Holly Schepisi, New Jersey state senator from the 39th district (2021–present)
- Judy Ward, 30th district (2019–present)

State representatives

- Carrie DelRosso, 33rd district (2021–2022)
- Torren Ecker, 193rd district (2019–present)
- Jim Gregory, 80th district (2018–present)
- Aaron Kaufer, 120th district (2015–2024)
- Dan Moul, 91st district (2007–present)
- Greg Rothman, 87th district (2015–2022)
- Frank Ryan, 101st district (2017–2022)
- Lou Schmitt, 79th district (2019–present)
- Guy Talarico, New Jersey state assemblyman from the 38th district (1997–2002)
- Martina White, 170th district (2015–present)

Local officials

- Tom Knox, former deputy mayor of Philadelphia for management and productivity (1992-1993) (Democrat)
- Justin Taylor, mayor of Carbondale, Pennsylvania (2003–2024) (Democrat)

Party officials

- Thomas O. Hicks Jr., co-chair of the Republican National Committee (2019–2023)
- Ronna McDaniel, chair of the Republican National Committee (2017–2024)
- Steve Wynn, finance chair of the Republican National Committee (2017–2018)

Labor unions

- EB Jermyn Fraternal Order of Police Lodge #2
- Fraternal Order of Police Lodge #91
- National Council of Prison Locals
- Pennsylvania State Corrections Officers Association
- Pennsylvania State Troopers Association
- Philadelphia Firefighters' and Paramedics' Union Local 22
- Philadelphia Fraternal Order of Police Lodge #5

Organizations

- American Crossroads
- Americans for Prosperity Action
- The Conservative Caucus
- Huck PAC
- Log Cabin Republicans
- National Federation of Independent Business
- National Republican Senatorial Committee
- NRA – Political Victory Fund
- Republican Jewish Coalition
- Susan B. Anthony Pro-Life America
- United States Chamber of Commerce

Newspapers and other media

- Pittsburgh Post-Gazette

Individuals

- Kathy Barnette, political commentator and candidate for U.S. Senate in Pennsylvania in 2022
- Jeff Bartos, 2018 Republican nominee for lieutenant governor of Pennsylvania, 2022 Republican candidate for Senate in Pennsylvania
- ~~Shmuley Boteach, Orthodox Jewish rabbi, author, and TV host~~ (rescinded endorsement)
- Marjorie Dannenfelser, president of Susan B. Anthony Pro-Life America
- José Fanjul, businessman
- Kimberly Guilfoyle, television news personality
- Harold Hamm, businessman
- Daniel Lubetzky, businessman and founder of Kind
- Gene Marks, columnist
- Chuck Norris, martial artist and actor
John Fetterman (D)

U.S. presidents

- Joe Biden, 46th president of the United States (2021–2025)
- Barack Obama, 44th president of the United States (2009–2017)

Executive branch officials

- Kamala Harris, 49th vice president of the United States (2021–2025)
- Patrick Murphy, U.S. secretary of the Army (2016) and former U.S. representative for Pennsylvania's 8th congressional district (2007–2011)

Statewide officials

- Josh Shapiro, attorney general of Pennsylvania (2017–2023) and 2022 Democratic gubernatorial nominee

U.S. senators

- Sherrod Brown, Ohio (2007–2025)
- Bob Casey Jr., Pennsylvania (2007–2025)
- Chris Coons, Delaware (2010–present)
- Amy Klobuchar, Minnesota (2007–present)
- Ben Nelson, Nebraska (2001–2013)
- Gary Peters, Michigan (2015–present)
- Bernie Sanders, Vermont (2007–present) (Independent)
- Elizabeth Warren, Massachusetts (2013–present)

U.S. representatives

- Brendan Boyle, PA-02; formerly PA-13 (2015–present)
- Bob Brady, PA-01 (1998–2019), chair of the Democratic Party of Philadelphia (1986–present)
- Matt Cartwright, PA-08 (2013–2025)
- Madeleine Dean, PA-04 (2019–present)
- Dwight Evans, PA-03 (2019–present)
- Gabby Giffords, AZ-08 (2007–2012)
- Chrissy Houlahan, PA-06 (2019–present)
- Conor Lamb, PA-17 (2018–2023) and candidate for U.S. Senate in 2022
- Alexandria Ocasio-Cortez, New York's 14th congressional district (2019–present)
- Mary Gay Scanlon, PA-05 (2019–present) and PA-07 (2018–2019)
- Susan Wild, PA-07; formerly PA-15 (2018–2025)

State senators

- Amanda Cappelletti, 17th district (2021–present)
- Anthony Williams, 8th district (1999–present)

State representatives

- Tina Davis, 141st district (2011–present)
- Malcolm Kenyatta, 181st district (2019–present) and candidate for U.S. Senate in 2022
- Patty Kim, state representative from the 103rd district (2013–2025)
- Summer Lee, state representative from the 34th district (2019–2022) and 2022 Democratic nominee for PA-12
- Joanna McClinton, 191st district (2015–present)
- Darisha Parker, 198th district (2020–present)

Local officials

- Ed Gainey, mayor of Pittsburgh (2022–present)
- Ezra Nanes, mayor of State College (2022–present)

Labor unions

- AFL–CIO
- Pennsylvania State Education Association
- Service Employees International Union
- United Mine Workers

Organizations

- Armenian National Committee of America
- Brand New Congress
- Democratic Majority for Israel
- Democratic Senatorial Campaign Committee
- End Citizens United
- Giffords
- Human Rights Campaign
- Humane Society Legislative Fund
- J Street
- Jewish Dems
- League of Conservation Voters
- Let America Vote
- NARAL Pro-Choice America
- Our Revolution
- Peace Action
- Pennsylvania Democratic Party
- Planned Parenthood
- Population Connection Action Fund
- Sierra Club

Newspapers

- The Citizens' Voice
- The Patriot-News
- The Philadelphia Inquirer
- The Philadelphia Tribune
- The York Dispatch

Individuals

- Michael Fanone, former police officer involved in the January 6 United States Capitol attack
- Franco Harris, former professional football player
- Brian Keene, author
- Dave Matthews, singer
- Paul Rudd, actor
- Everett Stern, whistleblower, private intelligence agency owner, and candidate for PA-13 in 2014 and U.S. Senate in 2016 and 2022 (Independent, former Republican)
- Kurt Vile, singer and record producer
- Kerry Washington, actress
- Oprah Winfrey, businesswoman and former talk show host who introduced Oz

=== Polling ===
Aggregate polls

Source of poll aggregation	Dates administered	Dates updated	Mehmet Oz (R)	John Fetterman (D)	Other	Margin
Real Clear Politics	October 24 – November 3, 2022	November 7, 2022	47.2%	46.8%	6.0%	Oz +0.4%
FiveThirtyEight	December 3, 2021 – November 7, 2022	November 7, 2022	47.4%	46.9%	5.7%	Oz +0.5%
270towin	November 3–4, 2022	November 4, 2022	46.8%	46.5%	6.7%	Oz +0.3%
Average			47.1%	46.7%	6.2%	Oz +0.4%

Graphical summary

View source data.

Poll source	Date(s) administered	Sample size	Margin of error	Mehmet Oz (R)	John Fetterman (D)	Other	Undecided
Research Co.	November 4–6, 2022	450 (LV)	± 4.6%	46%	47%	2% (Note: "Some other candidate" with 2%)	5%
Targoz Market Research	November 2–6, 2022	631 (LV)	± 3.8%	51%	46%	3% (Note: Gerhardt (L) with 2%; "All others" with 1%)	–
InsiderAdvantage (R)	November 3, 2022	750 (LV)	± 3.6%	48%	46%	4% (Note: Gerhardt (L) with 2%; "Someone else" with 2%)	3%
The Trafalgar Group (R)	November 1–3, 2022	1,097 (LV)	± 2.9%	48%	46%	3%	4%
Remington Research Group (R)	November 1–2, 2022	1,180 (LV)	± 2.8%	47%	44%	4% (Note: Gerhardt (L) with 2%; Weiss (G) with 1%; "Someone else" with 1%)	5%
Marist College	October 31 – November 2, 2022	1,152 (RV)	± 3.8%	44%	50%	1% (Note: "Another party's candidate" with 1%)	5%
Marist College	October 31 – November 2, 2022	1,021 (LV)	± 4.0%	45%	51%	1%	4%
Susquehanna Polling & Research (R)	October 28 – November 1, 2022	700 (LV)	± 3.7%	48%	47%	2% (Note: "Other" with 1%; "Refuse" with 1%)	4%
Emerson College	October 28–31, 2022	1,000 (LV)	± 3.0%	48%	46%	3% (Note: Gerhardt (L) with 2%, Weiss (G) with 1%; Wassmer (K) with <1%; "Someone else" with <1%)	4%
Emerson College	October 28–31, 2022	1,000 (LV)	± 3.0%	48%	47%	4% (Note: Gerhardt (L) with 2%, Weiss (G) with 1%; Wassmer (K) with <1%; "Someone else" with 2%)	–
Suffolk University	October 27–30, 2022	500 (LV)	± 4.4%	45%	47%	1% (Note: Gerhardt (L) with 1%; Wassmer (K) with <1%; Weiss (G) with <1%)	7%
Fox News	October 26–30, 2022	1,005 (RV)	± 3.0%	42%	45%	6% (Note: Stern (I, WI) with 4%; "Other" with 1%; "Wouldn't vote" with 1%)	6%
Big Data Poll (R)	October 27–28, 2022	1,005 (LV)	± 3.0%	48%	46%	3%	2%
co/efficient (R)	October 26–28, 2022	1,716 (LV)	± 3.4%	48%	45%	4% (Note: "Someone else" with 4%)	2%
Muhlenberg College	October 24–28, 2022	460 (LV)	± 6.0%	47%	47%	3% (Note: "Neither/Other" with 3%)	2%
Wick Insights (R)	October 26–27, 2022	1,000 (LV)	± 3.2%	48%	46%	4%	3%
InsiderAdvantage (R)	October 26, 2022	750 (LV)	± 3.6%	48%	45%	4% (Note: Gerhardt (L) with 3%, "Someone else" with 1%)	4%
Siena Research/NYT	October 24–26, 2022	620 (LV)	± 4.4%	44%	49%	<1% (Note: Gerhardt (L) with <1%; Weiss (G) with <1%)	6%
YouGov/CBS News	October 21–24, 2022	1,084 (LV)	± 4.1%	49%	51%	1% (Note: "Someone else" with 1%)	–
Franklin & Marshall College	October 14–23, 2022	620 (RV)	± 5.3%	40%	45%	4% (Note: "Some other candidate" with 2%; "Not going to vote" with 1%; Gerhardt (L) with 1%)	11%
Franklin & Marshall College	October 14–23, 2022	384 (LV)	± 6.8%	45%	49%	–	–
Rasmussen Reports (R)	October 19–20, 2022	972 (LV)	± 3.0%	43%	45%	6% (Note: "Some other candidate" with 6%)	6%
Echelon Insights	October 18–20, 2022	500 (LV)	± 4.8%	43%	46%	4% (Note: Gerhardt (L) with 2%; Weiss (G) and Wassmer (K) with 1%)	7%
InsiderAdvantage (R)	October 19, 2022	550 (LV)	± 4.2%	46%	46%	3% (Note: Gerhardt (L) with 2%; "Someone else" with 1%)	5%
CNN/SSRS	October 13–17, 2022	901 (RV)	± 4.1%	41%	52%	6% (Note: "Neither" with 5%; "Other" with 1%)	–
CNN/SSRS	October 13–17, 2022	703 (LV)	± 4.6%	45%	51%	3% (Note: "Neither" with 2%; "Other" with 1%)	–
Wick Insights (R)	October 8–14, 2022	1,013 (LV)	± 3.1%	49%	45%	3% (Note: "Someone else" with 3%)	3%
Patriot Polling (R)	October 10–12, 2022	857 (RV)	–	48%	46%	–	7%
Fabrizio Ward (R)/Impact Research (D)	October 4–12, 2022	1,400 (LV)	± 4.4%	46%	48%	2% (Note: "Other" with 2%)	4%
The Trafalgar Group (R) (Note: This poll was sponsored by The Daily Wire)	October 8–11, 2022	1,078 (LV)	± 2.9%	45%	47%	4% (Note: Gerhardt (L) with 3%; "Other" with 1%)	4%
Center Street PAC (D) (Note: This poll was sponsored by Center Street PAC, which opposes Oz)	September 29–30, 2022	971 (RV)	± 3.5%	34%	50%	–	16%
Center Street PAC (D)	September 29–30, 2022	568 (LV)	± 3.5%	36%	55%	–	9%
Suffolk University	September 27–30, 2022	500 (LV)	± 4.4%	40%	46%	3% (Note: Gerhardt (L) with 2%; Wassmer (K) with 1%; Weiss (G) with <1%)	11%
Emerson College	September 23–26, 2022	1,000 (LV)	± 3.0%	43%	45%	5% (Note: "Someone else" with 5%)	8%
Fox News	September 22–26, 2022	1,008 (RV)	± 3.0%	41%	45%	7% (Note: Stern (I, W/I) with 3%, "other" with 1%, and 3% "wouldn't vote,")	7%
Fox News	September 22–26, 2022	827 (LV)	± 3.0%	44%	48%	3% (Note: Stern (I, W/I) with 2%, "other" with 1%)	5%
Franklin & Marshall College	September 19–25, 2022	517 (RV)	± 5.6%	42%	45%	–	13%
InsiderAdvantage (R)	September 23–24, 2022	550 (LV)	± 4.2%	42%	45%	6% (Note: Gerhardt (L) with 2%; "Someone else" with 4%)	8%
Marist College	September 19–22, 2022	1,242 (RV)	± 3.5%	41%	51%	<1% (Note: "Another party's candidate" with <1%)	7%
Marist College	September 19–22, 2022	1,043 (LV)	± 3.8%	44%	51%	–	4%
The Phillips Academy Poll	September 16–19, 2022	759 (RV)	± 3.6%	45%	47%	–	9%
Muhlenberg College	September 13–16, 2022	420 (LV)	± 6.0%	44%	49%	5% (Note: "Neither/Other" with 5%)	2%
The Trafalgar Group (R)	September 13–15, 2022	1,078 (LV)	± 2.9%	46%	48%	4% (Note: Gerhardt (L) and "Other" with 4%)	2%
YouGov/CBS News	September 6–12, 2022	1,194 (RV)	± 3.8%	47%	52%	–	1%
Echelon Insights	August 31 – September 7, 2022	828 (RV)	± 4.1%	36%	57%	–	7%
RABA Research	August 31 – September 3, 2022	679 (LV)	± 3.8%	40%	49%	3%	8%
Kurt Jetta (D)	August 31 – September 1, 2022	1,012 (RV)	± 3.5%	33%	51%	–	15%
Kurt Jetta (D)	August 31 – September 1, 2022	616 (LV)	± 3.5%	36%	55%	–	9%
Susquehanna Polling & Research (R)	August 22–29, 2022	718 (LV)	± 3.7%	44%	49%	2%	5%
Emerson College	August 22–23, 2022	1,034 (LV)	± 3.0%	44%	48%	3%	5%
Franklin & Marshall College	August 15–21, 2022	522 (RV)	± 5.3%	36%	45%	9% (Note: "Some other candidate" with 4%; Gerhardt (L) with 3%; Wassmer (K) and Weiss (G) with 1%)	10%
The Trafalgar Group (R)	August 15–18, 2022	1,096 (LV)	± 2.9%	44%	48%	4% (Note: Gerhardt (L) and "Other" with 2%)	5%
Public Opinion Strategies (R)	August 7–10, 2022	600 (RV)	± 4.0%	36%	52%	–	11%
Kurt Jetta (D)	July 29 – August 1, 2022	1,206 (A)	± 2.8%	30%	47%	–	23%
Kurt Jetta (D)	July 29 – August 1, 2022	997 (RV)	± 3.1%	32%	48%	–	20%
Kurt Jetta (D)	July 29 – August 1, 2022	516 (LV)	± 4.3%	38%	52%	–	10%
Fox News	July 22–26, 2022	908 (RV)	± 3.0%	36%	47%	5% (Note: Stern (I, WI) with 3%; "other" (volunteered response) with 2%)	11%
PEM Management Corporation (R) (Note: This poll was conducted for John Bolton Super PAC)	July 22–24, 2022	300 (LV)	± 5.7%	38%	44%	4%	15%
Blueprint Polling (D)	July 19–21, 2022	712 (LV)	± 3.7%	40%	49%	–	12%
Beacon Research (D) (Note: This poll was sponsored by the Environmental Voter Project)	July 5–20, 2022	1,012 (RV)	± 3.1%	34%	47%	1%	13%
Beacon Research (D)	July 5–20, 2022	609 (LV)	± 4.0%	39%	50%	2%	9%
Global Strategy Group (D) (Note: This poll was sponsored by EDF Action and NRDC Action Fund)	July 14–19, 2022	1,200 (LV)	± 2.9%	40%	51%	–	9%
Fabrizio Ward (R)/Impact Research (D)	June 12–19, 2022	1,382 (LV)	± 4.4%	44%	50%	–	6%
Cygnal (R)	June 16–17, 2022	535 (LV)	± 4.2%	44%	48%	–	8%
Suffolk University	June 10–13, 2022	500 (LV)	± 4.4%	37%	46%	3% (Note: Gerhardt (L), Magee (I, W/I), Stern (I, WI), and Weiss (G) with 1%; Johnson (C) and "someone else" with <1%)	13%
Susquehanna Polling & Research (R)	~May 10, 2022	– (LV)	–	33%	51%	–	16%
Data for Progress (D)	December 3–5, 2021	581 (LV)	± 4.0%	42%	44%	–	13%

Hypothetical polling

Jeff Bartos vs. John Fetterman

Poll source	Date(s) administered	Sample size	Margin of error	Jeff Bartos (R)	John Fetterman (D)	Undecided
Garin-Hart-Yang (D) (Note: Poll sponsored by Collective PAC.)	May 10–19, 2021	450 (LV)	± 4.7%	36%	45%	19%
Data for Progress (D)	May 7–14, 2021	310 (LV)	± 5.6%	38%	48%	14%

Jeff Bartos vs. Conor Lamb

Poll source	Date(s) administered	Sample size	Margin of error	Jeff Bartos (R)	Conor Lamb (D)	Undecided
Data for Progress (D)	May 7–14, 2021	341 (LV)	± 5.3%	42%	43%	15%

Sean Parnell vs. John Fetterman

Poll source	Date(s) administered	Sample size	Margin of error	Sean Parnell (R)	John Fetterman (D)	Undecided
Garin-Hart-Yang (D)	May 10–19, 2021	450 (LV)	± 4.7%	42%	42%	16%
Data for Progress (D)	May 7–14, 2021	310 (LV)	± 5.6%	40%	48%	12%

Sean Parnell vs. Conor Lamb

Poll source	Date(s) administered	Sample size	Margin of error	Sean Parnell (R)	Conor Lamb (D)	Undecided
Data for Progress (D)	May 7–14, 2021	341 (LV)	± 5.3%	44%	42%	14%

=== Results ===
Fetterman won the election by 4.9 percentage points, and was declared the winner in the early hours of November 9. The early victory came as a shock to many pundits, as the race was expected to take several days to project a winner; the race was one of the first signs of the coming Democratic overperformance relative to the final polls in the midterms writ large. Oz underperformed former Republican president Donald Trump's performance in the 2020 United States presidential election in Pennsylvania by 3.7 percentage points, while overperforming Republican nominee Doug Mastriano in the concurrent gubernatorial race by 10 percentage points. With this election, a Democrat was elected to both U.S. Senate seats from Pennsylvania for the first time since 1944, and to this seat since 1962. (Note: Democrats briefly held both of Pennsylvania's Senate seats from 2009 to 2011 when Arlen Specter, who was elected as a Republican to this seat, switched to the Democratic Party.) According to Ron Brownstein of CNN in 2023, Fetterman won independent voters by double-digit margins, which contributed to Oz's defeat.

2022 United States Senate election in Pennsylvania
Party	Candidate	Votes	%	±%
Democratic	John Fetterman	2,751,012	51.17%	+3.88%
Republican	Mehmet Oz	2,487,260	46.27%	−2.45%
Libertarian	Erik Gerhardt	72,887	1.36%	−2.52%
Green	Richard L. Weiss	30,434	0.57%	N/A
Keystone	Dan Wassmer	26,428	0.49%	N/A
Write-in		7,864	0.15%	+0.04%
Total votes		5,375,885	100.0%	N/A
Democratic gain from Republican				

==== By county ====
County	John Fetterman Democratic		Mehmet Oz Republican		Erik Gerhardt Libertarian		Richard Weiss Green		Dan Wassmer Keystone		Margin		Total votes
County	#	%	#	%	#	%	#	%	#	%	#	%	Total votes
Adams	16,096	34.68	29,039	62.56	704	1.52	289	0.62	291	0.63	-12,943	-27.88	46,419
Allegheny	363,873	63.42	200,632	34.97	5,190	0.90	2,343	0.41	1,671	0.29	163,241	28.45	573,709
Armstrong	8,065	28.38	19,575	68.89	465	1.64	131	0.46	177	0.62	-11,510	-40.51	28,413
Beaver	32,692	44.51	38,772	52.79	1,143	1.56	410	0.56	426	0.58	-6,080	-8.28	73,443
Bedford	3,796	17.07	17,954	80.72	261	1.17	101	0.45	129	0.58	-14,158	-63.66	22,241
Berks	71,349	46.08	78,019	50.39	3,315	2.14	1,149	0.74	992	0.64	-6,670	-4.31	154,824
Blair	14,763	29.40	34,214	68.13	627	1.25	295	0.59	321	0.64	-19,451	-38.73	50,220
Bradford	6,632	28.24	16,033	68.28	450	1.92	162	0.69	204	0.87	-9,401	-40.04	23,481
Bucks	164,536	52.35	141,340	44.97	4,633	1.47	2,145	0.68	1,657	0.53	23,196	7.38	314,311
Butler	33,921	36.34	57,168	61.25	1,346	1.44	414	0.44	486	0.52	-23,247	-24.91	93,335
Cambria	18,849	33.45	35,847	63.62	868	1.54	365	0.65	419	0.74	-16,998	-30.17	56,348
Cameron	547	29.00	1,247	66.12	46	2.44	19	1.01	27	1.43	-700	-37.12	1,886
Carbon	9,682	36.91	15,659	59.69	559	2.13	160	0.61	172	0.66	-5,977	-22.78	26,232
Centre	32,597	52.52	27,902	44.96	834	1.34	372	0.60	356	0.57	4,695	7.56	62,061
Chester	147,559	57.20	104,020	40.32	3,586	1.39	1,579	0.61	1,219	0.47	43,539	16.88	257,963
Clarion	4,327	28.15	10,620	69.09	238	1.55	91	0.59	95	0.62	-6,293	-40.94	15,371
Clearfield	8,533	27.18	21,948	69.90	489	1.56	193	0.61	236	0.75	-13,415	-42.72	31,399
Clinton	4,750	33.89	8,791	62.72	219	1.56	96	0.68	161	1.15	-4,041	-28.83	14,017
Columbia	9,023	36.46	14,830	59.93	518	2.09	176	0.71	198	0.80	-5,807	-23.47	24,745
Crawford	11,081	33.55	20,992	63.55	575	1.74	187	0.57	198	0.60	-9,911	-30.00	33,033
Cumberland	53,278	45.96	59,663	51.47	1,783	1.54	589	0.51	614	0.53	-6,385	-5.51	115,927
Dauphin	61,599	53.82	50,141	43.81	1,503	1.31	593	0.52	610	0.53	11,458	10.01	114,446
Delaware	157,599	62.87	87,322	34.84	3,454	1.38	1,483	0.59	809	0.32	70,277	28.04	250,667
Elk	4,066	29.86	9,128	67.02	225	1.65	85	0.62	115	0.84	-5,062	-37.17	13,619
Erie	56,404	53.35	46,507	43.98	1,554	1.47	702	0.66	567	0.54	9,897	9.36	105,734
Fayette	17,731	37.87	28,234	60.30	438	0.94	196	0.42	225	0.48	-10,503	-22.43	46,824
Forest	694	31.81	1,434	65.72	27	1.24	17	0.78	10	0.46	-740	-33.91	2,182
Franklin	18,718	28.70	44,819	68.72	845	1.30	420	0.64	418	0.64	-26,101	-40.02	65,220
Fulton	953	15.26	5,171	82.79	74	1.18	18	0.29	30	0.48	-4,218	-67.53	6,246
Greene	4,394	33.57	8,348	63.77	160	1.22	105	0.80	84	0.64	-3,954	-30.20	13,091
Huntingdon	4,665	25.54	13,035	71.37	286	1.57	135	0.74	143	0.78	-8,370	-45.83	18,264
Indiana	11,218	34.25	20,769	63.41	398	1.22	179	0.55	191	0.58	-9,551	-29.16	32,755
Jefferson	4,135	23.25	13,139	73.87	293	1.65	98	0.55	121	0.68	-9,004	-50.62	17,786
Juniata	2,111	21.70	7,265	74.68	176	1.81	55	0.57	121	1.24	-5,154	-52.98	9,728
Lackawanna	50,489	56.77	36,534	41.08	1,020	1.15	441	0.50	459	0.52	13,955	15.69	88,943
Lancaster	94,632	42.14	124,798	55.58	3,272	1.46	1,147	0.51	699	0.31	-30,166	-13.43	224,548
Lawrence	13,758	38.00	21,531	59.47	511	1.41	189	0.52	217	0.60	-7,773	-21.47	36,206
Lebanon	19,695	34.86	35,023	62.00	1,107	1.96	318	0.56	348	0.62	-15,328	-27.13	56,491
Lehigh	73,096	53.63	59,219	43.45	2,269	1.66	958	0.70	759	0.56	13,877	10.18	136,301
Luzerne	51,504	44.28	61,978	53.28	1,662	1.43	663	0.57	516	0.44	-10,474	-9.00	116,323
Lycoming	13,573	29.36	31,171	67.42	882	1.91	305	0.66	302	0.65	-17,598	-38.06	46,233
McKean	4,135	28.22	10,076	68.77	214	1.46	95	0.65	131	0.89	-5,941	-40.55	14,651
Mercer	17,080	37.66	27,049	59.64	673	1.48	279	0.62	271	0.60	-9,969	-21.98	45,352
Mifflin	3,965	23.62	12,263	73.06	278	1.66	114	0.68	165	0.98	-8,298	-49.44	16,785
Monroe	30,251	51.51	26,746	45.54	989	1.68	450	0.77	294	0.50	3,505	5.97	58,730
Montgomery	260,207	63.01	143,077	34.65	5,416	1.31	2,502	0.61	1,752	0.42	117,130	28.36	412,954
Montour	3,213	41.02	4,328	55.25	154	1.97	57	0.73	81	1.03	-1,115	-14.23	7,833
Northampton	66,565	51.21	59,860	46.05	1,949	1.50	919	0.71	694	0.53	6,705	5.16	129,987
Northumberland	10,812	32.87	20,992	63.82	583	1.77	241	0.73	267	0.81	-10,180	-30.95	32,895
Perry	5,646	27.91	13,956	68.98	392	1.94	111	0.55	126	0.62	-8,310	-41.08	20,231
Philadelphia	412,841	82.71	78,408	15.71	3,718	0.74	2,532	0.51	1,652	0.33	334,433	67.00	499,151
Pike	9,821	38.98	14,792	58.71	293	1.16	148	0.59	142	0.56	-4,971	-19.73	25,196
Potter	1,415	19.91	5,486	77.18	120	1.69	40	0.56	47	0.66	-4,071	-57.27	7,108
Schuylkill	17,954	32.40	35,293	63.69	1,214	2.19	457	0.82	495	0.89	-17,339	-31.29	55,413
Snyder	4,220	27.52	10,657	69.49	239	1.56	89	0.58	131	0.85	-6,437	-41.97	15,336
Somerset	7,660	23.55	23,964	73.67	523	1.61	190	0.58	191	0.59	-16,304	-50.12	32,528
Sullivan	869	28.81	2,023	67.08	65	2.16	31	1.03	28	0.93	-1,154	-38.26	3,016
Susquehanna	5,245	30.30	11,520	66.55	269	1.55	128	0.74	149	0.86	-6,275	-36.25	17,311
Tioga	4,103	24.67	11,988	72.08	281	1.69	136	0.82	124	0.75	-7,885	-47.41	16,632
Union	6,249	38.83	9,401	58.41	210	1.30	127	0.79	107	0.66	-3,152	-19.58	16,094
Venango	6,777	32.50	13,406	64.29	385	1.85	126	0.60	160	0.77	-6,629	-31.79	20,854
Warren	5,420	33.68	10,175	63.23	243	1.51	118	0.73	136	0.85	-4,755	-29.55	16,092
Washington	39,684	42.29	52,337	55.77	1,083	1.15	322	0.34	410	0.44	-12,653	-13.48	93,836
Wayne	7,669	33.77	14,425	63.51	344	1.51	140	0.62	134	0.59	-6,756	-29.75	22,712
Westmoreland	66,240	39.43	98,238	58.47	2,057	1.22	678	0.40	796	0.47	-31,998	-19.04	168,009
Wyoming	4,059	34.46	7,338	62.30	215	1.83	75	0.64	92	0.78	-3,279	-27.84	11,779
York	71,929	38.56	109,631	58.77	2,975	1.59	956	0.51	1,060	0.57	-37,702	-20.21	186,551
Totals	2,751,012	51.25	2,487,260	46.33	72,887	1.36	30,434	0.57	26,428	0.49	263,752	4.91	5,368,021

Counties that flipped from Republican to Democratic

- Bucks (largest municipality: Bensalem)
- Centre (largest municipality: State College)
- Chester (largest municipality: West Chester)
- Dauphin (largest municipality: Harrisburg)
- Erie (largest municipality: Erie)
- Northampton (largest municipality: Bethlehem)

==== By congressional district ====
Fetterman won ten of 17 congressional districts, including one that elected a Republican.

District	Oz	Fetterman	Representative
1st	44.9%	52.4%	Brian Fitzpatrick
2nd	25.9%	72.1%	Brendan Boyle
3rd	8.2%	90.5%	Dwight Evans
4th	37.6%	59.8%	Madeleine Dean
5th	32.4%	65.5%	Mary Gay Scanlon
6th	41.1%	56.3%	Chrissy Houlahan
7th	46.3%	50.8%	Susan Wild
8th	48.2%	49.4%	Matt Cartwright
9th	63.5%	33.1%	Dan Meuser
10th	49.2%	48.3%	Scott Perry
11th	57.8%	39.8%	Lloyd Smucker
12th	35.2%	63.2%	Mike Doyle (117th Congress)
12th	35.2%	63.2%	Summer Lee (118th Congress)
13th	68.4%	28.8%	John Joyce
14th	59.9%	37.9%	Guy Reschenthaler
15th	63.7%	33.4%	Glenn Thompson
16th	55.4%	41.9%	Mike Kelly
17th	42.1%	56.1%	Conor Lamb (117th Congress)
17th	42.1%	56.1%	Chris Deluzio (118th Congress)

==== Voter demographics ====
Voter demographic data for 2022 was collected by CNN. The voter survey is based on exit polls completed by 2,660 voters in person as well as by phone.

2022 United States Senate election voter demographics in Pennsylvania (CNN)
Demographic subgroup	Fetterman	Oz	% of total vote
Ideology
Liberals	92	6	25
Moderates	64	34	41
Conservatives	9	91	34
Party
Democrats	94	5	37
Republicans	10	90	40
Independents	58	38	24
Gender
Men	44	54	50
Women	57	41	50
Marital status
Married	47	53	64
Unmarried	60	37	36
Gender by marital status
Married men	42	57	36
Married women	52	48	28
Unmarried men	52	43	14
Unmarried women	65	34	21
Race/ethnicity
White	45	53	82
Black	91	8	8
Latino	68	30	8
White voters by gender
White men	39	59	41
White women	51	48	40
Age
18–24 years old	72	25	7
25–29 years old	68	31	5
30–39 years old	60	37	13
40–49 years old	50	49	11
50–64 years old	45	54	29
65 and older	46	53	34
2020 presidential vote
Biden	93	6	48
Trump	8	92	45
First time midterm election voter
Yes	62	34	12
No	49	50	88
Education
Never attended college	36	63	24
Some college education	56	41	21
Associate degree	48	49	14
Bachelor's degree	52	47	23
Advanced degree	66	32	18
Education by race
White college graduates	56	43	35
White no college degree	38	60	47
Non-white college graduates	74	25	6
Non-white no college degree	79	20	12
Education by gender/race
White women with college degrees	62	37	17
White women without college degrees	44	55	24
White men with college degrees	50	49	18
White men without college degrees	32	66	23
Non-white	77	22	18
Issue regarded as most important
Crime	51	49	11
Abortion	78	21	37
Inflation	27	72	28
Feelings about Roe v. Wade being overturned
Enthusiastic/satisfied	10	89	38
Dissatisfied/angry	79	19	59
Abortion should be
Legal	76	22	62
Illegal	10	88	34

== See also ==
- 2022 United States Senate elections

== Notes ==
Partisan clients
