= Everett Stern =

American businessman and whistleblower

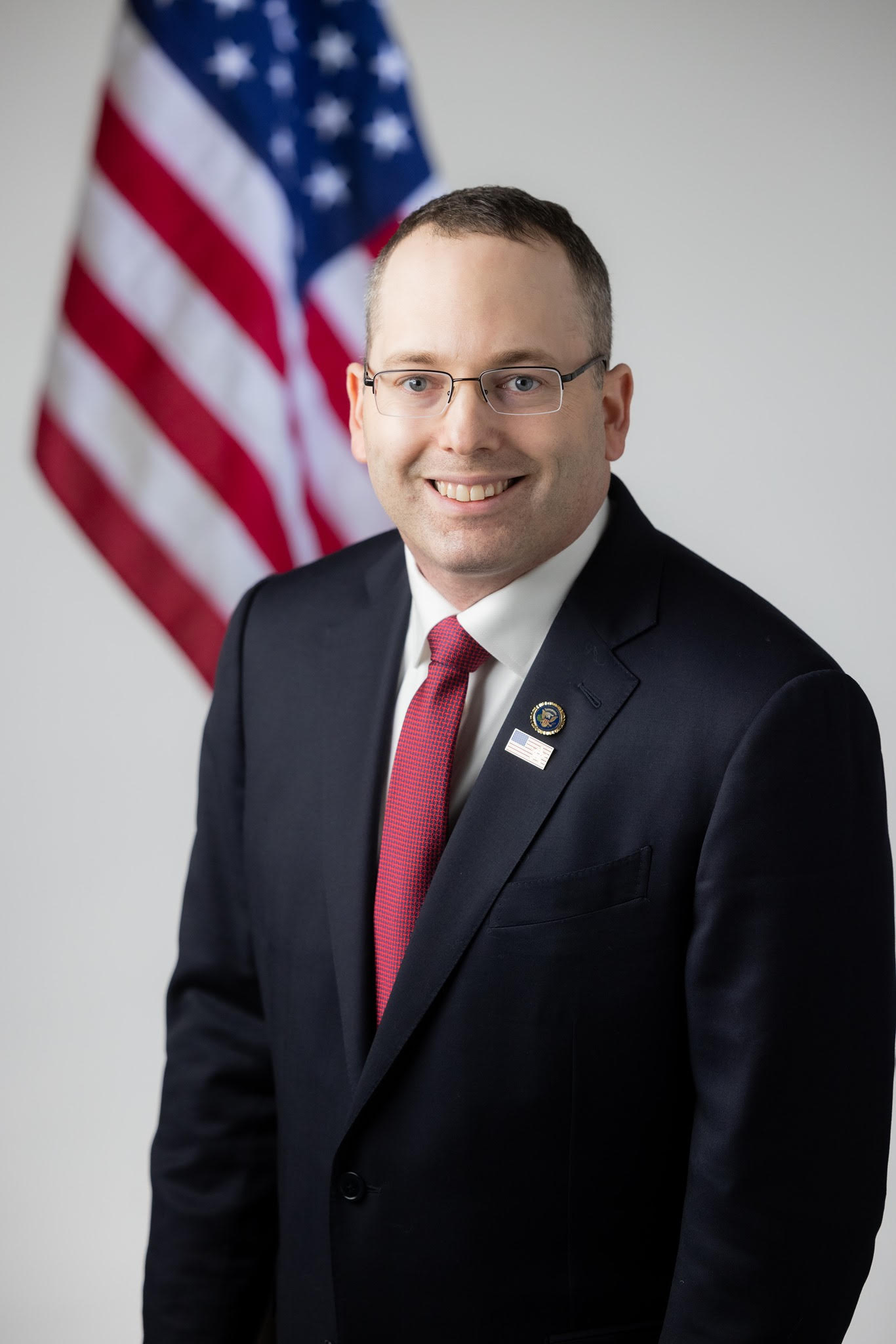
- Born: Everett Alexander Stern c. 1985; New York City, U.S.
- Education: Florida Atlantic University (BA); Stetson University (MBA)
- Political party: Independent (2022–present)
- Other political affiliations: Republican (until 2022)
- Website: everettstern.com

Everett Alexander Stern (born c. 1985) is an American businessman, whistleblower, and political candidate who is the intelligence director of Tactical Rabbit, Inc. He exposed an HSBC money laundering scandal, where he uncovered illegal money laundering transactions. Having formerly attempted to run for office as a member of the Republican Party, he ran as an independent write-in candidate in the 2022 United States Senate election in Pennsylvania, but dropped out in late October.

== Early life and education ==
Stern was born in New York City to a Jewish family. His father was a radiologist who worked for the United States Department of Veterans Affairs, and his mother was a social worker. Raised in Wellington, Florida, he graduated from Wellington High School in 2002. He earned a Bachelor of the Arts degree from Florida Atlantic University in 2008. Stern sought a position with the Directorate of Operations, but was turned down shortly before graduating. He earned a Masters in Business Administration degree from Stetson University in May 2010.

== Business career ==
=== HSBC money laundering scandal ===
In October 2010 Stern took a position as an anti-money laundering (AML) compliance officer for HSBC in their New Castle, Delaware office where he monitored the bank's Middle Eastern transactions. Stern identified many suspicious transactions tied to terrorist groups in the Middle East, such as Hamas and Hezbollah. Specifically, he uncovered a multinational money-laundering network that generated millions of dollars for Hezbollah through the Lebanese brothers Ali, Husayn, and Kassim Tajideen through their Gambia-based company, Tajco Ltd. Stern sent numerous alerts and was repeatedly ignored by his HSBC supervisor. After several such episodes, Stern made contact with the FBI and CIA, which began to investigate HSBC. Self-directed, Stern continued to collect and pass information to the CIA regarding HSBC's blatant abuse and manipulation of wire filters to approve illegal wire transfers. He left HSBC in October 2011. By the summer of 2012, the inquiry had broadened to the bank's money laundering operations in the Middle East, Mexico, Iran, Sudan, and North Korea.

In February 2013, Stern was first featured as an HSBC whistleblower in Rolling Stone magazine in the article Gangster Bankers: Too Big to Jail.

In February 2018, Stern was featured as an HSBC whistleblower in the Netflix series Dirty Money.

==== Aftermath ====
Stern reached a resignation agreement from his position with HSBC in October 2011. After being "blacklisted" from the financial community Stern began working at a P.F. Chang's restaurant as a server. Stern self-funded and launched the private intelligence agency Tactical Rabbit the following year. In March 2013, Stern and the law firm Berger & Montague submitted evidence collected by Stern to the SEC that HSBC had continued to violate anti-money laundering regulations through October 2011, when Stern's employment with HSBC ended. In August 2013, Stern joined with an Occupy Wall Street working group called Alternative Banking to further publicize his allegations against HSBC. At a protest held on August 29, 2013, in New York City, Stern publicly alleged that HSBC had committed anti-laundering violations through the end of his employment in 2011, and asked that the government re-open the case against HSBC.

In December 2013, HSBC reached a settlement with the U.S. Treasury's Office of Foreign Assets Control regarding funds that had been transferred to financiers of the terrorist organization Hezbollah between December 2010 and April 2011. HSBC was required to pay $32,400. The Treasury department stated that this settlement was "unrelated to the bank's December 2012 agreement." Stern has continued to speak publicly through the media about his HSBC allegations, especially as they relate to the funding of terrorist groups and activities

=== Tactical Rabbit ===
Stern founded Tactical Rabbit with the intention of "exposing wrongdoing" in financial and corporate institutions.

In May 2015, Stern conducted an investigation into the closing of Sweet Briar College. Stern held a press conference on May 9, 2015, at the college and alleged that the company's intelligence operation revealed fraud. Stern pleaded for the American public and the FBI to get involved. Stern noted that "Saving Sweet Briar is not a Virginia problem, but it is a national problem requiring all Americans to act." In May 2015 Stern issued a public letter to FBI Director James Comey asking for an FBI investigation into his company's findings on the closing of the college.

In February 2018, Stern sent a notice to the Palm Beach County Sheriff's Office regarding one of its deputies allegedly posting racist and offensive content on social media accounts dating back to 2013 recommending that deputy be fired. Subsequently, the Sheriff's Department completed their investigation and the deputy was fired, according to a sheriff's spokesperson.

In 2018, Stern received a tip that the Michigan Department of Health and Human Services (MDHHS) had paid out hundreds of thousands of dollars in incorrect Medicaid reimbursements over a six-year period because a claims payment system had been disabled. After obtaining internal MDHHS emails through the Freedom of Information Act, Stern discovered that a health agency employee had intentionally turned off the computer program designed to monitor home health care services. The emails show that the agency changed the computer program to "ease the burden on claims processing staff".

== Political career ==
In the fall of 2013, Stern worked with Representative Maxine Waters on the Holding Individuals Accountable and Deterring Money Laundering Act, which sought to give the Financial Crimes Enforcement Network the authority to litigate on its own, and to stiffen penalties and prison sentences for bank executives involved in money laundering.

In February 2014, Stern announced he was running as a Republican for Pennsylvania's 13th congressional district in the 2014 elections. He withdrew from the race before the April 2014 filing deadline.

In April 2015, Stern announced his candidacy for United States Senate as a Republican candidate from Pennsylvania, challenging incumbent Pat Toomey for the Republican primary in the 2016 election. He again withdrew from the race before the filing deadline.

=== 2022 U.S. Senate campaign ===
Stern was an early candidate for the Republican nomination in the 2022 United States Senate election in Pennsylvania. He touted himself as a supporter of less federal regulation of business and industry, a backer of the right to bear arms, and a law-and-order candidate who would "fight any effort to scale back or weaken law enforcement in Pennsylvania's communities." He later withdrew from the Republican primary to run as an independent write-in candidate.

On October 25, Stern withdrew from the race due to low polling numbers. He endorsed Democrat John Fetterman over the Republican nominee, Mehmet Oz, citing Oz's backing by former President Donald Trump as a reason not to vote for him.

==== Criticism of Michael Flynn ====
According to Stern, two men by the direction of former U.S. National Security Advisor Michael Flynn asked him in April 2021 to use Tactical Rabbit's resources to find information on Republican officials from Pennsylvania. That information would then be used to convince them to support an audit of the 2020 United States presidential election. Stern referred to the plot as "extortion". He alerted the FBI to the two men's plans and also testified before the House Select Committee Investigating the January 6 Capitol Attack.

At a February 2022 Republican primary debate, Stern criticized those in the Republican Party who supported "right-wing extremism" and lies about the 2020 presidential election. During the debate, Stern interrupted fellow candidate Kathy Barnette, denouncing her for being supported by Flynn, a "traitor". Stern also told Barnette to apologize for transporting supporters to the Capitol Attack.

In May 2022, Flynn sued Stern for his allegations of Flynn being a "traitor" and "helm[ing] a domestic terrorist organization engaged in sedition", according to WUFT.
