= Kathy Barnette =

American politician

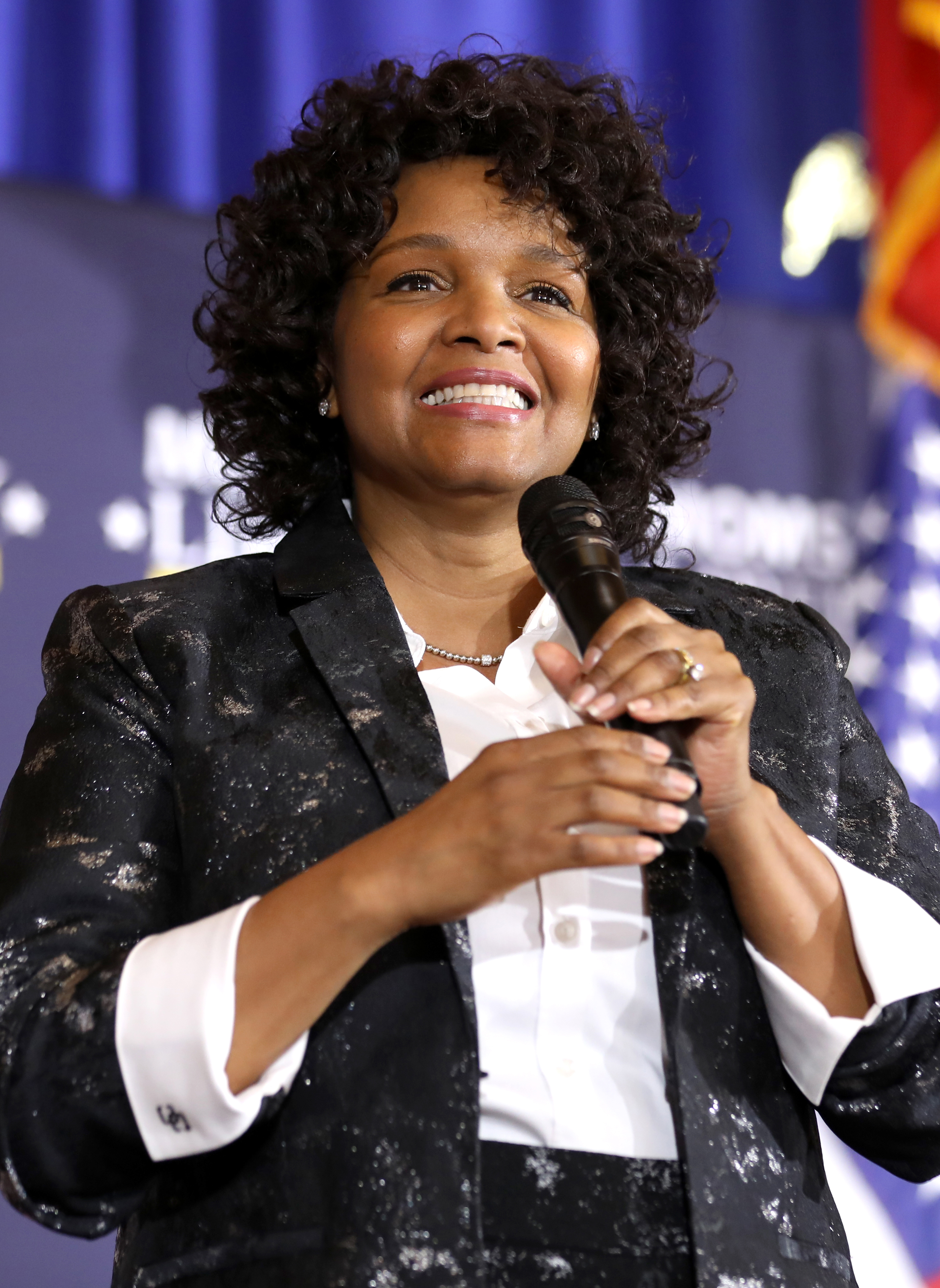
- Barnette in 2024

Personal details
- Born: Kathy Jean Barnette; September 6, 1971 (age 55) Alabama, U.S.
- Party: Republican
- Spouse: Carl
- Children: 2
- Education: Troy State University (BS); Fontbonne University (MBA)

Military service
- Allegiance: United States
- Branch/service: United States Army
- Rank: Specialist
- Unit: United States Army Reserve; National Guard

Kathy Jean Barnette (born September 6, 1971) is an American politician and political commentator. A member of the Republican Party, she ran for the United States House of Representatives in Pennsylvania's 4th congressional district in 2020, and was a candidate for the party's nomination in the 2022 United States Senate election in Pennsylvania.

== Early life ==
Barnette's mother was raped at the age of 11, which led to Barnette's birth on September 6, 1971, in Alabama. She was raised by her mother on a pig farm in a house in South Alabama where her great-great-great-grandmother, who was born a slave, formerly lived.

She received an undergraduate degree in finance from Troy State University, and an M.B.A. from Fontbonne University. Barnette served seven years in the United States Army Reserve and United States National Guard.

== Professional career ==
Barnette worked as a corporate financial analyst. Barnette's entry into political commentary began with political videos on Facebook. The videos led her to becoming an occasional guest on Fox & Friends. She also became a regular commentator on Philadelphia conservative radio. Barnette has made frequent appearances on One America News Network and Newsmax as well.

== Political career ==
Barnette entered politics by running for Pennsylvania's 4th congressional district in the 2020 election. She was unopposed in the Republican primary. She lost the general election to incumbent Madeleine Dean and initially refused to concede. While later saying she had accepted the results of the election, Barnette continued to raise doubts about her own election and the wider 2020 presidential election.

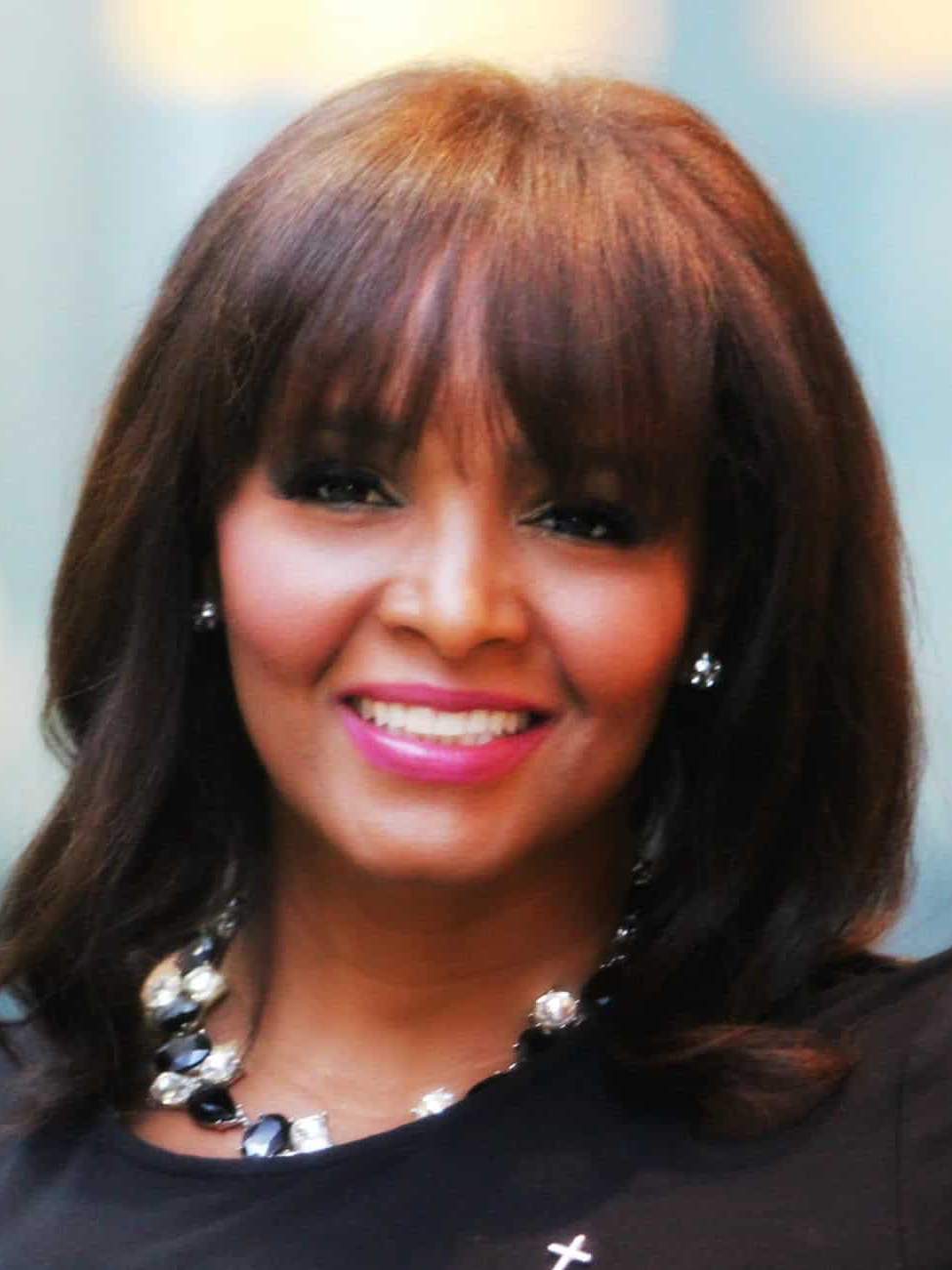
Barnette in 2019

On Election Day, Barnette filed a lawsuit against Montgomery County election officials claiming that the county violated state laws on pre-canvassing ballots prior to the opening of polls by notifying voters of potential problems with their mail-in ballots. Her attorneys then withdrew the lawsuit.

Barnette had a close relationship with My Pillow CEO Mike Lindell for a time. Lindell said of Barnette in June 2021, "She is just an amazing person" and "I never heard of anyone being so tenacious."

Barnette announced she would run to fill retiring Senator Pat Toomey's seat in early April 2021, and received endorsements from Michael Flynn and Sebastian Gorka. She raised about $600,000 by June 30, 2021, more than Sean Parnell or Jeff Bartos, the front runners at the time. She surged in the polls in late March 2022 and started receiving significant attention from news outlets in May.

Barnette began to receive scrutiny over past tweets she had made, including some spreading the conspiracy theory that former President Barack Obama is a Muslim, and others that have been described as homophobic and Islamophobic. In a 2015 YouTube video, Barnette said that it is okay to discriminate against Muslims and compared rejecting Islam to "rejecting Hitler's or Stalin's worldviews." In comments on her radio show, she said that accepting homosexuality would lead to accepting pedophilia and incest. In one post, she called a transgender person "deformed" and "demonic".

On May 15, 2022, images surfaced showing that Barnette had participated in the "Stop the Steal" rally that preceded the January 6 United States Capitol attack; though her campaign has denied participating in any acts of violence, she has stated that she "brought" three buses of "pissed off patriots" to the rally.

Barnette finished third in the 2022 primary, behind Mehmet Oz and David McCormick, a loss she blamed on comments made by Fox News host Sean Hannity. In October 2022, she stated that she would vote for Oz in the election, but declined to endorse him.

Barnette announced she would not run for the Senate again in 2024. As of 2023, she was involved in Vivek Ramaswamy's presidential campaign, which was suspended in January 2024.

=== Political positions ===
According to The Tennessee Star, in 2022 Barnette ran "on a platform emphasizing free-market health care, border security, school choice, domestic energy production, tax reform, and protection of the unborn."

Barnette is opposed to abortion, including in cases of rape and incest, citing her own life as "the product of a rape".

== Electoral history ==
Pennsylvania's 4th congressional district, 2020
Party	Candidate	Votes	%
Democratic	Madeleine Dean (incumbent)	264,637	59.5
Republican	Kathy Barnette	179,926	40.5
Total votes		444,563	100.0
Democratic hold			

Republican Senate primary results, 2022
Party	Candidate	Votes	%
Republican	Mehmet Oz	419,662	31.2
Republican	David McCormick	418,690	31.1
Republican	Kathy Barnette	331,584	24.7
Republican	Carla Sands	73,269	5.4
Republican	Jeff Bartos	66,563	5.0
Republican	Sean Gale	20,226	1.5
Republican	George Bochetto	14,462	1.1
Total votes		1,344,456	100.0

== Personal life ==
Barnette is married to Carl, and has two children. She stated that she has been a Christian since she was about 19 years old.

== Published works ==
- (2020). Nothing to Lose, Everything to Gain: Being Black and Conservative in America. Center Street. ISBN 978-1546085751
