= Sean McElwee =

American liberal activist and data scientist

- Born: 1992 or 1993 (age 33–34)
- Education: The King's College (BA); Columbia University (MA)
- Occupations: Data scientist, progressive activist
- Known for: Data for Progress
- Movement: American progressivism
- Spouse: Rachel Atcheson (m. 2025)

Sean McElwee (born 1992 or 1993) is an American policy advisor, data scientist, and activist. McElwee was the founding executive director of Data for Progress, a progressive think tank and polling firm he co-founded in 2018. He was also the Founder and Chairman of the Cheeky Lads Banter Club, a Massachusetts-based think tank before its dissolution in 2021. In December 2022, McElwee announced he would resign from the firm amidst allegations of artificially manipulating the results of polls and his close ties to fraudster Sam Bankman-Fried.

== Early life and education ==
McElwee was raised in Ledyard, Connecticut. He attended The King's College, a Christian college in New York City, and holds a master's degree in quantitative Methods for social science from Columbia University.

== Career ==
After graduating from college, he briefly worked for the Reason Foundation, a libertarian think tank. McElwee later became a researcher for the progressive think tank Demos.

== Political activism and journalism ==
McElwee began his journalistic career as an intern at CBS News and at Salon, and has since contributed to a variety of publications.

McElwee gained national attention in 2018 for his support of the Abolish ICE movement, and wrote a New York Times article on the topic. McElwee is an advocate of left-wing primary challenges to moderate Democrats. In 2020, McElwee reportedly pushed the Justice Democrats to spend money on Cori Bush's campaign against Lacy Clay.

McElwee had close ties to Sam Bankman-Fried, a former cryptocurrency billionaire, who has since been convicted of fraud. McElwee conducted polling for a Super PAC controlled by Bankman-Fried that was described as a "political strategy designed to shield crypto from government oversight". Additionally, he has been described by Politico as a leading figure for helping Bankman-Fried make straw donations.

== Data for Progress ==
In 2018, McElwee became the founding executive director Data for Progress (DFP), a progressive think tank and polling firm. The firm was credited by The Atlantic for releasing one of the first reports on the Green New Deal, and one independent analysis found that Data for Progress was the most accurate pollster in the 2020 Democratic presidential primary.

Polling and analysis from Data for Progress has been regularly cited by the Biden administration, and McElwee's tweets were noted for being frequently retweeted by White House Chief of Staff Ron Klain. Following the 2022 midterms, it was reported that McElwee was gambling on election results on the site PredictIt, which raised ethical concerns. According to New York Magazine, McElwee had bet $20,000 on PredictIt that Joe Biden would win the 2020 presidential election.

McElwee left the firm in November 2022 amidst allegations of gambling on election results and artificially manipulating polling results to affect races that he had bet money on. Additionally, it has been reported McElwee had inquired among his employees about having them participate in an illegal straw donor scheme. Senior members of Data for Progress informed McElwee that they would resign en masse, if he did not step down as the firm's executive director. In a statement reported by Puck, McElwee said he would start a new organization in support of implementing the Inflation Reduction Act of 2022.
