= Gene Marks =

American columnist

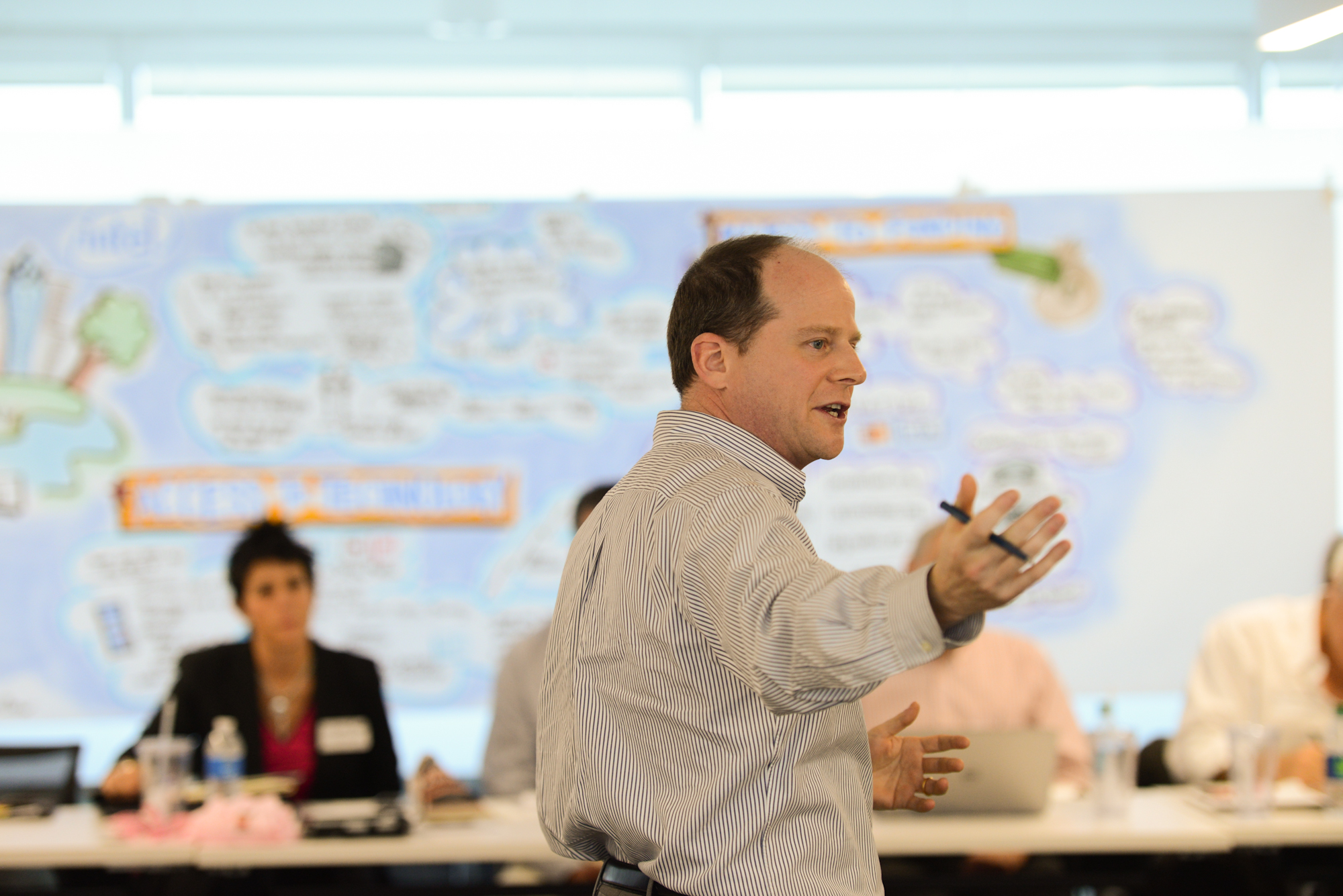
Marks moderating a "Go Local" think tank hosted by Dell in Austin, Texas.

Gene Marks is a columnist, author, and small business owner. A past columnist for both The Washington Post and The New York Times, Marks writes regularly for The Hill, The Philadelphia Inquirer, Forbes, Inc. magazine, Entrepreneur.com, The Washington Times and The Guardian.

== Career ==
Marks has written six best-selling books on business management, specifically geared towards small- and medium-sized companies. Nationally, he frequently appears on MSNBC and Fox Business as well as The John Batchelor Show and SiriusXM's Wharton Business Daily where he talks about the financial, economic and technology issues that affect business leaders today.

Through his keynotes and breakout sessions, Marks helps business owners, executives and managers understand the political, economic and technological trends that will affect their companies and—most importantly—the actions they can take to continue to grow and profit.

Marks owns and operates The Marks Group PC, a firm that provides technology and consulting services to small and medium-sized businesses.

Prior to starting the Marks Group PC Gene, a Certified Public Accountant, spent nine years in the entrepreneurial services arm of the international consulting firm KPMG in Philadelphia where he was a Senior Manager.

Marks wrote an opinion piece discussing the trend of 'quiet quitting' and described those who engage in the practice as "not taking your job seriously" and called those who decided to just meet their obligations at their jobs, "mediocre employees" and put some of the blame of the "economic slowdown" on those who decided they didn't want to go "above and beyond" for their employees when they saw no reward for their effort.
