= Ari Mittleman =

American political advisor and author

- Born: Johnson City, NY
- Education: George Washington University; Fels Institute of Government (University of Pennsylvania)
- Occupation: Public Relations Professional
- Known for: Executive Director, Keep Our Republic
- Notable work: Paths of the Righteous: Stories of Heroism, Humanity and Hope

Ari Mittleman is an American public relations professional and author. He founded Keystone Strategy & Advocacy, a public affairs and strategic communications firm, and serves as the executive director of Keep Our Republic, a bipartisan nonprofit focused on election integrity.

== Early life and education ==
Mittleman grew up in Allentown, Pennsylvania, and attended a local Jewish day school. He formally studied the Hebrew language and traditional Jewish texts beginning in kindergarten. Mittleman earned a B.A. from the Department of American Studies at George Washington University and an M.P.A. from the Fels Institute of Government at the University of Pennsylvania.

While a student at George Washington University, Mittleman co-organised a national post-9/11 memorial project in which participants from across the United States created sections of a large quilt designed in the pattern of the American flag. The initiative began as a campus project but expanded into a nationwide effort, with contributions from diverse groups and an unveiling at the Washington Monument.

He resides in Pikesville, Maryland, with his wife and daughter.

== Career ==
Mittleman worked as a senior advisor to Senator Bob Casey for eight years. During his time with Senator Casey, Mittleman traveled extensively to all 67 counties in Pennsylvania.

After leaving government service, he founded Keystone Strategy & Advocacy, advising on political organizing, coalition building, crisis communications, and social media advocacy.

Mittleman served as a moderator at political forums, including a Democratic U.S. Senate debate at Muhlenberg College in 2022 and a Philadelphia mayoral forum on arts and culture hosted by the Philadelphia Orchestra and the Kimmel Center in 2023.

In 2023, Mittleman helped fund and organise a series of digital billboards in New York and Pittsburgh to thank Senator John Fetterman for his support of Israel, an initiative coordinated by a group of politically active members of the Jewish community.

The Algemeiner recognized Mittleman as one of 100 individuals who have influenced Jewish life.

=== Keep Our Republic ===
Mittleman is the executive director of Keep Our Republic, a nonpartisan civic organization founded in 2020 to shore up confidence in U.S. elections. The group focuses on potential threats to the election system. It educates the public about election procedures, from the closing of polls to the certification of electoral votes.

The group aims to clarify the election process and address questions about issues like the security of voting machines, the transfer of ballots from polling stations to county elections offices, the eligibility of undocumented immigrants to vote, and concerns about votes cast under deceased individuals’ names.

Under Mittleman's supervision, the organization has hosted legal education classes in Pennsylvania. It has also organized events with election officials in Wisconsin, Pennsylvania, and Michigan, targeting areas where tensions over election administration were particularly high. Mittleman explained that the group focused on these states because "firefighters go where the fire is".

Mittleman and other staff members of Keep Our Republic travel across Michigan, Pennsylvania and Wisconsin to connect voters with local officials and provide nonpartisan information about election procedures, noting that participants generally engage seriously with the organization's educational programs.

Mittleman identifies declining public trust in U.S. elections as a cross-partisan issue and highlights Keep Our Republic's use of a nonpartisan model for election-related public education.

Keep Our Republic received the inaugural Unsung Hero of Democracy Award from the American Bar Association in August 2024.

=== Work in the Balkans ===
Mittleman spent time in Osijek, Croatia, working as a grant writer for a local NGO. His experience in the region has included observing Balkan reconstruction and reconciliation efforts.

== Publications ==
Mittleman is a columnist for The Times of Israel and has contributed articles to the USA Today Network, Baltimore Jewish Times, The Morning Call, The Jerusalem Post, Washington Examiner, The Patriot-News, Pittsburgh Tribune-Review, NorthJersey.com, Modern Diplomacy, and The Jewish Exponent.

In 2022, Gefen Publishing House in Jerusalem launched his book, Paths of the Righteous: Stories of Heroism, Humanity and Hope. Mittleman highlights the stories of eight non-Jewish individuals who have stood up and spoken out for Israel and the Jewish community. He began writing the book in the aftermath of the Tree of Life Synagogue attack in Pittsburgh.

In 2023, Paths of the Righteous was presented at the Esplanade Hotel in Zagreb at an event organised by Croatian Minister of Culture Nina Obuljen Koržinek and Israeli Ambassador Ilan Mor.

== Philanthropy ==
Mittleman served as the founding board chairman of the St. Bernard Project, a post-Katrina-Rita disaster recovery nonprofit organization that provides relief and support in the United States. It assists communities affected by major disasters in rebuilding homes and navigating the recovery process.
