= Data for Progress =

American policy think tank

- Abbreviation: DFP
- Formation: 2018; 8 years ago
- Type: Policy think tank
- Executive director: Ryan O'Donnell
- Website: dataforprogress.org

Data for Progress (DFP) is an American left-wing think tank, polling firm, and political advocacy group. Until his dismissal in November 2022, the organization was headed by data scientist and activist Sean McElwee, who co-founded the organization in 2018.

Affiliated with the progressive movement, Data for Progress has released reports and conducted polling on policy matters such as proposals for a Green New Deal. Following the election of Joe Biden as President of the United States, Data for Progress has been described as an influential force among progressives in the Democratic Party.

== History and mission ==
Data for Progress was founded in 2018 by political activist Sean McElwee, computational scientist Colin McAuliffe, and political scientist Jon Green.

Data for Progress has been credited by The Atlantic for releasing one of the first reports on the Green New Deal.

McElwee has stated that he envisions Data for Progress to serve as a "one-stop shop" for left-wing policy development, polling, and using media to gain public recognition for progressive goals.

Data for Progress has become subject to criticism from some members of the American Left, who argue it is insufficiently critical of the party establishment. Reception to the organization was noted in a 2021 article in The New York Times, which highlighted Data for Progress's unusually fast rise to influence:

President Biden mentions it in private calls. The White House reads its work. And Senator Chuck Schumer, the majority leader, teams up with its leaders for news conferences, blog posts and legislation. The embrace of Data for Progress by the highest ranks of the Democratic Party is a coming-of-age moment for a left-leaning polling firm and think tank that is barely three years old.

In 2021, vice president of policy & strategy Julian Brave NoiseCat was named to Time magazine's Time 100 Next list of emerging global leaders.

== Polling ==
Data for Progress regularly conducts election polling, especially for primary elections. In the 2020 race for New York's 16th congressional district, Data for Progress was the sole public pollster to show challenger Jamaal Bowman lead incumbent Eliot Engel. In 2021, the firm conducted polling that found a majority of Democratic voters in Arizona would favor a primary challenge to Senator Kyrsten Sinema due to her opposition to some of the Biden administration's measures in Congress.

In the 2020 presidential cycle, Data for Progress's polling on viewers' response to the presidential debate between Donald Trump and Joe Biden was covered by the Washington Post. Following the 2020 presidential election, the New York Times published a piece titled "Polling's Prognosis: Wary Conservatives and Eager Liberals" regarding Data for Progress's polling outfit. The article stated:

Data for Progress's results have been on the more accurate side among its peers, though it relies entirely on so-called nonprobability methods [that] haven't gained full acceptance as an industry standard for political polls, at least not yet.

Data for Progress' polls in 2020 underestimated support for Republican candidates.

During the 2022 midterms, their polls ended up overestimating Republican support. The Tartan reported that the group's leader, Sean McElwee, was gambling on election results on the website PredictIt, raising ethical concerns. McElwee left the firm in November 2022 amidst allegations of gambling on election results and artificially manipulating polling results to affect races that he had bet money on. Additionally, it has been reported McElwee had inquired among his employees about having them participate in an illegal straw donor scheme. Senior members of Data for Progress informed McElwee that they would resign en masse if he did not step down as the firm's executive director.

== Activities ==
Policy areas that have been polled by Data for Progress include proposals to end the filibuster and expand voting rights, environmental policy (including the Green New Deal and green housing), proposals for Medicare for All, pharmaceutical drug pricing, capping credit card interest rates, reallocating funds appropriated to the defense budget to domestic services,

=== Federal personnel ===
During and following the 2020 presidential election, Data for Progress pushed for the inclusion of progressives and the exclusion of moderates in a Biden administration. Julian Brave NoiseCat, the organization's vice president of policy & strategy, has been credited for leading a successful lobbying campaign to have Deb Haaland be appointed as Secretary of the Interior.

=== State legislative elections ===
In 2019, the New York Times profiled the organization's "Party Builder" ranking built in conjunction with Future Now Fund. This list served to quantify the support given by 2020 Democratic presidential primary candidates to state legislative candidates in order to incentive further investment in these races. 2019 also saw the launch of Data for Progress's "Fuck Gerry(mandering)" project in collaboration with Crooked Media, which served to assist Democrats running for the Virginia General Assembly.

=== Blog ===
Data for Progress's blog has been contributed to by political figures including Senate Majority Leader Chuck Schumer.
