= 2014 Pennsylvania House of Representatives election =

- November 4, 2014

All 203 seats in the Pennsylvania House of Representatives 102 seats needed for a majority
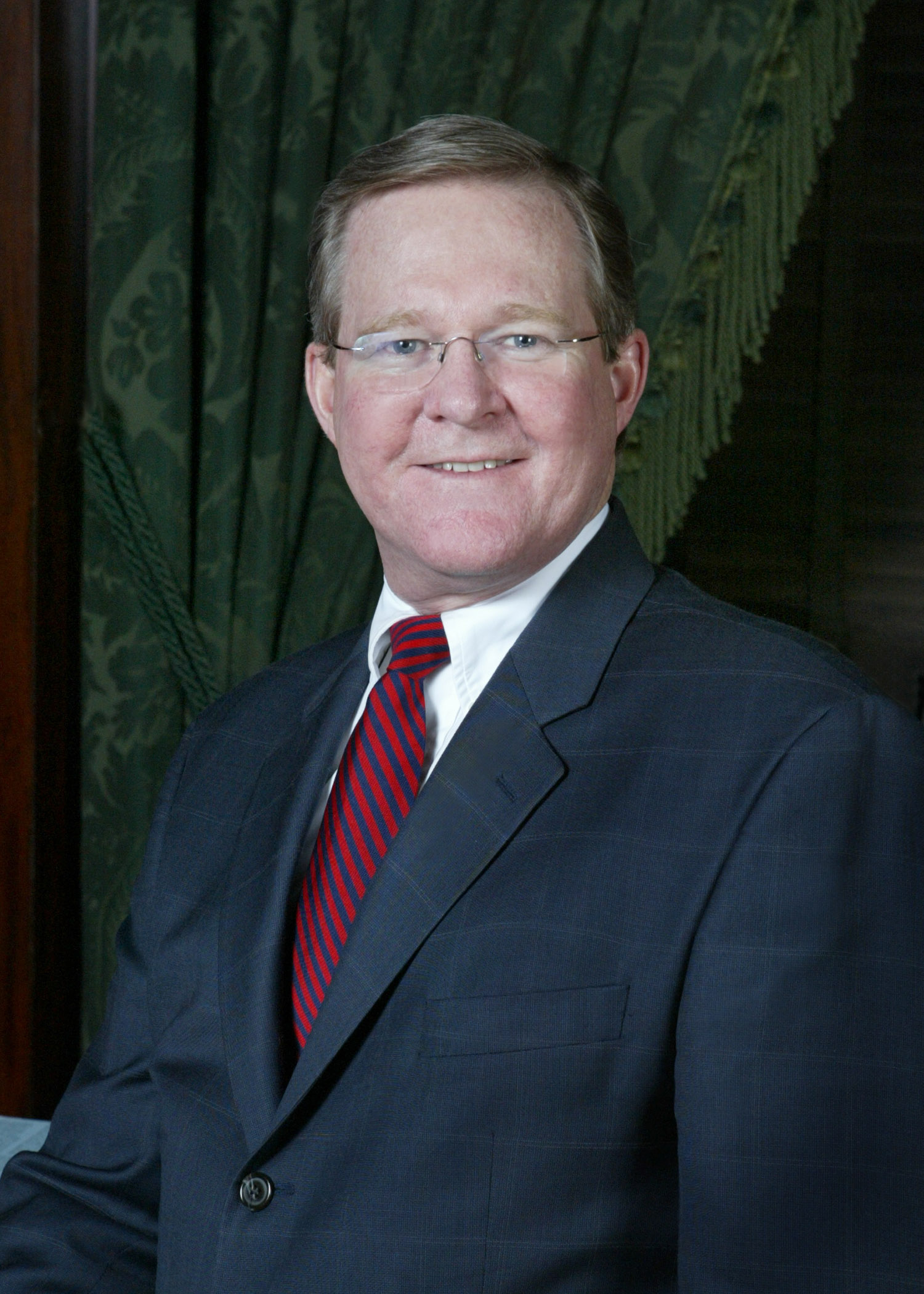

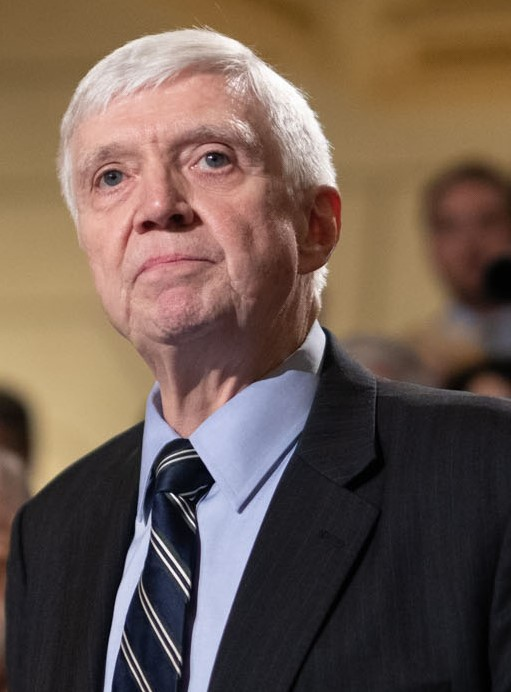
	Majority party	Minority party
Leader	Sam Smith	Frank Dermody
Party	Republican	Democratic
Leader since	January 4, 2011	January 4, 2011
Leader's seat	66th	33rd
Last election	111	92
Seats won	119	84
Seat change	▲8	▼8
Popular vote	1,825,181	1,408,624
Percentage	56.14%	43.33%
- Results: Republican hold Republican gain Democratic hold Democratic gain
Speaker before election
Sam Smith
Republican
Elected Speaker
Mike Turzai
Republican

The 2014 elections for the Pennsylvania House of Representatives were held on November 4, 2014, with all districts being contested. The primary elections were held on May 20, 2014.

Republicans gained eight seats to expand their majority in the chamber over the Democrats.

== Background ==
The term of office for those elected in 2014 began when the House of Representatives convened in January 2015. Pennsylvania State Representatives are elected for two-year terms, with all 203 seats up for election every two years.

These were the first elections held under new maps drawn using data from the 2010 census. Maps intended for use in the 2012 elections were struck down by the Supreme Court of Pennsylvania due to splitting too many counties and municipalities unnecessarily. The court later allowed a new set of maps drawn by Republicans to pass despite accusations of partisan gerrymandering from Democrats, but they were not passed in time to be used for the 2012 elections.

== Overview ==
Affiliation	Candidates	Votes	Vote %	Seats Won
Republican	147	1,825,181	56.24%	119 (▲8)
Democratic	146	1,408,624	43.33%	84 (▼8)
Independent	3	8,094	0.25%	0
Libertarian	3	7,808	0.24%	0
Green	2	1,403	0.04%	0
Total	301	3,251,110	100%	203

Popular vote for 203 House seats
Republican	56.24%
Democratic	43.33%
Other	0.53%

Percentage of 203 House seats won
Republican	58.62%
Democratic	41.38%

== Predictions ==
Source	Ranking	As of
Governing	Likely R	October 20, 2014

== Results by district ==
District	Party	Incumbent	Status	Party	Candidate	Votes	%
1	Democratic	Pat Harkins	Re-elected	Democratic	Pat Harkins	9,146	100.00
2	Democratic	Florindo Fabrizio	Re-elected	Democratic	Florindo Fabrizio	11,214	100.00
3	Democratic	Ryan Bizzarro	Re-elected	Democratic	Ryan Bizzarro	13,115	64.71
3	Democratic	Ryan Bizzarro	Re-elected	Republican	Luke Lofgren	7,175	35.29
4	Republican	Curt Sonney	Re-elected	Republican	Curt Sonney	10,762	63.73
4	Republican	Curt Sonney	Re-elected	Democratic	Curtis Smith	6,124	36.27
5	Republican	Greg Lucas	Ran for State Senate	Republican	Barry Jozwiak	11,367	63.29
5	Republican	Greg Lucas	Ran for State Senate	Democratic	Frederick Sheeler	6,594	36.71
6	Republican	Brad Roae	Re-elected	Republican	Brad Roae	11,960	63.88
6	Republican	Brad Roae	Re-elected	Democratic	Juanita Shutsa	6,763	36.12
7	Democratic	Mark Longietti	Re-elected	Democratic	Mark Longietti	14,930	100.00
8	Republican	Dick Stevenson	Retired	Republican	Tedd Nesbit	14,098	100.00
9	Democratic	Chris Sainato	Re-elected	Democratic	Chris Sainato	10,085	66.85
9	Democratic	Chris Sainato	Re-elected	Republican	Gary Cangey	5,002	33.15
10	Democratic	Jaret Gibbons	Re-elected	Democratic	Jaret Gibbons	10,820	100.00
11	Republican	Brian Ellis	Re-elected	Republican	Brian Ellis	14,290	100.00
12	Republican	Daryl Metcalfe	Re-elected	Republican	Daryl Metcalfe	12,458	61.71
12	Republican	Daryl Metcalfe	Re-elected	Democratic	Lisa Zucco	7,731	38.29
13	Republican	John Lawrence	Re-elected	Republican	John Lawrence	10,280	62.91
13	Republican	John Lawrence	Re-elected	Democratic	Ann Schott	6,061	37.19
14	Republican	Jim Marshall	Re-elected	Republican	Jim Marshall	17,597	100.00
15	Republican	Jim Christiana	Re-elected	Republican	Jim Christiana	12,585	69.42
15	Republican	Jim Christiana	Re-elected	Democratic	Paul Cain	5,545	30.58
16	Democratic	Rob Matzie	Re-elected	Democratic	Rob Matzie	13,013	100.00
17	Republican	Michele Brooks	Retired	Republican	Parke Wentling	11,197	67.32
17	Republican	Michele Brooks	Retired	Democratic	Wayne Hanson	5,535	32.68
18	Republican	Gene DiGirolamo	Re-elected	Republican	Gene DiGirolamo	11,551	100.00
19	Democratic	Jake Wheatley	Re-elected	Democratic	Jake Wheatley	9,404	86.65
19	Democratic	Jake Wheatley	Re-elected	Republican	Mark Brentley	1,449	13.35
20	Democratic	Adam Ravenstahl	Re-elected	Democratic	Adam Ravenstahl	9,997	60.74
20	Democratic	Adam Ravenstahl	Re-elected	Republican	Thomas Fodi	6,463	39.26
21	Democratic	Dom Costa	Re-elected	Democratic	Dom Costa	13,992	100.00
22	Democratic	Erin Molchany	Re-districted	Democratic	Peter Schweyer	4,538	70.18
22	Democratic	Erin Molchany	Re-districted	Republican	Steven Ramos Santos	1,928	29.82
23	Democratic	Dan Frankel	Re-elected	Democratic	Dan Frankel	13,246	100.00
24	Democratic	Ed Gainey	Re-elected	Democratic	Ed Gainey	15,600	100.00
25	Democratic	Joe Markosek	Re-elected	Democratic	Joe Markosek	10,480	60.61
25	Democratic	Joe Markosek	Re-elected	Republican	John Ritter	6,811	39.39
26	Republican	Tim Hennessey	Re-elected	Republican	Tim Hennessey	12,870	100.00
27	Democratic	Dan Deasy	Re-elected	Democratic	Dan Deasy	12,309	100.00
28	Republican	Mike Turzai	Re-elected	Republican	Mike Turzai	17,146	100.00
29	Republican	Bernie O'Neill	Re-elected	Republican	Bernie O'Neill	15,863	100.00
30	Republican	Hal English	Re-elected	Republican	Hal English	18,390	100.00
31	Democratic	Steve Santarsiero	Re-elected	Democratic	Steve Santarsiero	13,323	58.02
31	Democratic	Steve Santarsiero	Re-elected	Republican	David Gibbon	9,639	41.98
32	Democratic	Tony DeLuca	Re-elected	Democratic	Tony DeLuca	15,093	100.00
33	Democratic	Frank Dermody	Re-elected	Democratic	Frank Dermody	8,668	53.02
33	Democratic	Frank Dermody	Re-elected	Republican	Sean Watson	7,681	46.98
34	Democratic	Paul Costa	Re-elected	Democratic	Paul Costa	14,639	100.00
35	Democratic	Marc Gergely	Re-elected	Democratic	Marc Gergely	10,048	71.30
35	Democratic	Marc Gergely	Re-elected	Republican	Kenneth Peoples	4,045	28.70
36	Democratic	Harry Readshaw	Re-elected	Democratic	Harry Readshaw	12,205	100.00
37	Republican	Mindy Fee	Re-elected	Republican	Mindy Fee	14,078	77.53
37	Republican	Mindy Fee	Re-elected	Democratic	Brian Kresge	4,081	22.47
38	Democratic	Bill Kortz	Re-elected	Democratic	Bill Kortz	13,998	100.00
39	Republican	Rick Saccone	Re-elected	Republican	Rick Saccone	11,805	60.35
39	Republican	Rick Saccone	Re-elected	Democratic	Lisa Stout Bashioum	7,755	39.65
40	Republican	John Maher	Re-elected	Republican	John Maher	18,007	100.00
41	Republican	Ryan Aument	Elected to State Senate	Republican	Brett Miller	13,196	59.40
41	Republican	Ryan Aument	Elected to State Senate	Democratic	Alice Yoder	9,020	40.60
42	Democratic	Dan Miller	Re-elected	Democratic	Dan Miller	14,213	100.00
43	Republican	Keith Greiner	Re-elected	Republican	Keith Greiner	12,412	71.04
43	Republican	Keith Greiner	Re-elected	Democratic	Steven Stone	5,061	28.96
44	Republican	Mark Mustio	Re-elected	Republican	Mark Mustio	14,108	100.00
45	Democratic	Nick Kotik	Re-elected	Democratic	Nick Kotik	11,130	60.96
45	Democratic	Nick Kotik	Re-elected	Republican	Benjamin Gross	7,127	39.04
46	Democratic	Jesse White	Defeated	Republican	Jason Ortitay	10,747	56.36
46	Democratic	Jesse White	Defeated	Democratic	Jesse White	8,323	43.64
47	Republican	Keith Gillespie	Re-elected	Republican	Keith Gillespie	14,659	100.00
48	Democratic	Brandon Neuman	Re-elected	Democratic	Brandon Neuman	10,168	58.73
48	Democratic	Brandon Neuman	Re-elected	Republican	Sonia Stopperich	7,145	41.27
49	Democratic	Peter Daley	Re-elected	Democratic	Peter Daley	8,557	56.43
49	Democratic	Peter Daley	Re-elected	Republican	Donald Cook	6,608	43.57
50	Democratic	Pam Snyder	Re-elected	Democratic	Pam Snyder	11,517	100.00
51	Democratic	Tim Mahoney	Re-elected	Democratic	Timothy S. Mahoney	10,206	100.00
52	Democratic	Deberah Kula	Retired	Republican	Ryan Warner	8,255	52.91
52	Democratic	Deberah Kula	Retired	Democratic	Andrew Boni	7,347	47.09
53	Republican	Bob Godshall	Re-elected	Republican	Bob Godshall	11,038	62.65
53	Republican	Bob Godshall	Re-elected	Democratic	Dorothy Miller	6,581	37.35
54	Republican	Eli Evankovich	Re-elected	Republican	Eli Evankovich	13,720	69.47
54	Republican	Eli Evankovich	Re-elected	Democratic	Patrick Leyland	6,029	30.53
55	Democratic	Joe Petrarca	Re-elected	Democratic	Joe Petrarca	9,731	62.04
55	Democratic	Joe Petrarca	Re-elected	Republican	Brian Panichelli	5,953	37.96
56	Republican	George Dunbar	Re-elected	Republican	George Dunbar	15,653	100.00
57	Republican	Tim Krieger	Re-elected	Republican	Tim Krieger	12,734	69.19
57	Republican	Tim Krieger	Re-elected	Democratic	Donna McClellan	5,671	30.81
58	Democratic	Ted Harhai	Re-elected	Democratic	Ted Harhai	8,760	50.82
58	Democratic	Ted Harhai	Re-elected	Republican	Thomas Logan	8,478	49.18
59	Republican	Mike Reese	Re-elected	Republican	Mike Reese	16,421	100.00
60	Republican	Jeff Pyle	Re-elected	Republican	Jeff Pyle	14,531	100.00
61	Republican	Kate Harper	Re-elected	Republican	Kate Harper	13,744	60.74
61	Republican	Kate Harper	Re-elected	Democratic	Suzan Leonard	8,882	39.26
62	Republican	Dave Reed	Re-elected	Republican	Dave Reed	10,747	65.42
62	Republican	Dave Reed	Re-elected	Democratic	Kevin Freeburg	5,681	34.58
63	Republican	Donna Oberlander	Re-elected	Republican	Donna Oberlander	13,742	100.00
64	Republican	Lee James	Re-elected	Republican	Lee James	13,127	100.00
65	Republican	Kathy Rapp	Re-elected	Republican	Kathy Rapp	10,341	64.78
65	Republican	Kathy Rapp	Re-elected	Democratic	Toby Anderson	5,622	35.22
66	Republican	Sam Smith	Retired	Republican	Cris Dush	11,777	72.06
66	Republican	Sam Smith	Retired	Democratic	Robert Santik	4,567	27.94
67	Republican	Martin Causer	Re-elected	Republican	Martin Causer	12,169	100.00
68	Republican	Matt Baker	Re-elected	Republican	Matt Baker	13,385	82.21
68	Republican	Matt Baker	Re-elected	Democratic	Jonathan Ruth	2,896	17.79
69	Republican	Carl Walker Metzgar	Re-elected	Republican	Carl Walker Metzgar	17,861	100.00
70	Democratic	Matt Bradford	Re-elected	Democratic	Matt Bradford	10,573	100.00
71	Democratic	Bryan Barbin	Re-elected	Democratic	Bryan Barbin	9,674	51.89
71	Democratic	Bryan Barbin	Re-elected	Republican	James Rigby	8,968	48.11
72	Democratic	Frank Burns	Re-elected	Democratic	Frank Burns	11,354	62.57
72	Democratic	Frank Burns	Re-elected	Republican	Philip Rice	6,792	37.43
73	Democratic	Gary Haluska	Retired	Republican	Tommy Sankey	14,971	100.00
74	Republican	Tommy Sankey	Re-districted	Republican	Harry Lewis	8,236	53.79
74	Republican	Tommy Sankey	Re-districted	Democratic	Joshua Maxwell	7,074	46.21
75	Republican	Matt Gabler	Re-elected	Republican	Matt Gabler	13,262	74.21
75	Republican	Matt Gabler	Re-elected	Democratic	John Donahue	4,610	25.79
76	Democratic	Mike Hanna	Re-elected	Democratic	Mike Hanna	10,926	100.00
77	Democratic	Scott Conklin	Re-elected	Democratic	Scott Conklin	7,179	84.14
77	Democratic	Scott Conklin	Re-elected	Libertarian	Charles Martin	1,353	15.86
78	Republican	Jesse Topper	Re-elected	Republican	Jesse Topper	14,972	100.00
79	Republican	John McGinnis	Re-elected	Republican	John McGinnis	10,685	100.00
80	Republican	Jerry Stern	Retired	Republican	Judy Ward	11,001	67.69
80	Republican	Jerry Stern	Retired	Democratic	Jason Lynn	5,251	32.31
81	Republican	Mike Fleck	Defeated	Republican	Rich Irvin	10,420	53.99
81	Republican	Mike Fleck	Defeated	Democratic	Mike Fleck	8,881	46.01
82	Republican	Adam Harris	Re-elected	Republican	Adam Harris	12,888	100.0
83	Democratic	Rick Mirabito	Defeated	Republican	Jeff Wheeland	8,382	55.26
83	Democratic	Rick Mirabito	Defeated	Democratic	Rick Mirabito	6,785	44.74
84	Republican	Garth Everett	Re-elected	Republican	Garth Everett	13,750	79.89
84	Republican	Garth Everett	Re-elected	Democratic	Kristen Hayes	3,462	20.11
85	Republican	Fred Keller	Re-elected	Republican	Fred Keller	10,895	69.17
85	Republican	Fred Keller	Re-elected	Democratic	Michael Sundberg	4,857	30.83
86	Republican	Mark Keller	Re-elected	Republican	Mark Keller	14,112	100.00
87	Republican	Glen Grell	Re-elected	Republican	Glen Grell	19,685	100.00
88	Republican	Sheryl Delozier	Re-elected	Republican	Sheryl Delozier	16,716	100.00
89	Republican	Rob Kauffman	Re-elected	Republican	Rob Kauffman	13,717	100.00
90	Republican	Todd Rock	Retired	Republican	Paul Schemel	12,148	81.72
90	Republican	Todd Rock	Retired	Independent	William Hornbarger	2,718	18.28
91	Republican	Dan Moul	Re-elected	Republican	Dan Moul	14,052	100.00
92	Republican	Mike Regan	Re-elected	Republican	Mike Regan	17,941	100.00
93	Republican	Ron Miller	Retired	Republican	Kristin Phillips-Hill	16,031	100.00
94	Republican	Stan Saylor	Re-elected	Republican	Stan Saylor	12,499	72.33
94	Republican	Stan Saylor	Re-elected	Democratic	David Colon	7,781	27.67
95	Democratic	Kevin Schreiber	Re-elected	Democratic	Kevin Schreiber	8,461	100.00
96	Democratic	Mike Sturla	Re-elected	Democratic	Mike Sturla	8,029	100.00
97	Republican	Steven Mentzer	Re-elected	Republican	Steven Mentzer	14,746	64.50
97	Republican	Steven Mentzer	Re-elected	Democratic	Charles Hample	8,117	35.50
98	Republican	Dave Hickernell	Re-elected	Republican	Dave Hickernell	12,063	69.20
98	Republican	Dave Hickernell	Re-elected	Democratic	Anthony Crocamo	4,699	26.96
98	Republican	Dave Hickernell	Re-elected	Green	Ryan Hazel	669	3.84
99	Republican	Gordon Denlinger	Ran for State Senate	Republican	David Zimmerman	9,974	71.30
99	Republican	Gordon Denlinger	Ran for State Senate	Democratic	Ryan Sanguinito	4,014	28.70
100	Republican	Bryan Cutler	Re-elected	Republican	Bryan Cutler	11,138	100.00
101	Republican	Mauree Gingrich	Re-elected	Republican	Mauree Gingrich	12,138	71.67
101	Republican	Mauree Gingrich	Re-elected	Democratic	Patricia Stephens	4,799	28.33
102	Republican	RoseMarie Swanger	Retired	Republican	Russ Diamond	7,668	48.00
102	Republican	RoseMarie Swanger	Retired	Democratic	Jake Long	4,446	27.83
102	Republican	RoseMarie Swanger	Retired	Independent	Robert McAteer	3,861	24.17
103	Democratic	Patty Kim	Re-elected	Democratic	Patty Kim	10,512	100.00
104	Republican	Sue Helm	Re-elected	Republican	Sue Helm	12,199	55.89
104	Republican	Sue Helm	Re-elected	Democratic	Gene Stilp	9,629	44.11
105	Republican	Ron Marsico	Re-elected	Republican	Ron Marsico	15,432	67.62
105	Republican	Ron Marsico	Re-elected	Democratic	Kelly Jean McEntee	7,391	32.38
106	Republican	John Payne	Re-elected	Republican	John Payne	14,727	100.00
107	Republican	Kurt Masser	Re-elected	Republican	Kurt Masser	11,054	77.78
107	Republican	Kurt Masser	Re-elected	Libertarian	John Burd	3,157	22.22
108	Republican	Lynda Schlegel-Culver	Re-elected	Republican	Lynda Schlegel-Culver	13,068	100.00
109	Republican	David Millard	Re-elected	Republican	David Millard	10,645	100.00
110	Republican	Tina Pickett	Re-elected	Republican	Tina Pickett	13,356	100.00
111	Republican	Sandra Major	Re-elected	Republican	Sandra Major	12,546	75.66
111	Republican	Sandra Major	Re-elected	Democratic	John Heptig	4,035	24.34
112	Democratic	Kevin Haggerty	Defeated in primary	Democratic	Frank Farina	14,162	100.00
113	Democratic	Marty Flynn	Re-elected	Democratic	Marty Flynn	11,537	74.58
113	Democratic	Marty Flynn	Re-elected	Republican	Marcel Lisi	3,932	25.42
114	Democratic	Sid Michaels Kavulich	Re-elected	Democratic	Sid Michaels Kavulich	12,981	66.95
114	Democratic	Sid Michaels Kavulich	Re-elected	Republican	Melanie Madeira	6,407	33.05
115	Democratic	Frank Farina	Re-districted	Republican	David Parker	5,903	52.62
115	Democratic	Frank Farina	Re-districted	Democratic	Maureen Madden	5,315	47.38
116	Republican	Tarah Toohil	Re-elected	Republican	Tarah Toohil	11,710	100.00
117	Republican	Karen Boback	Re-elected	Republican	Karen Boback	12,429	72.97
117	Republican	Karen Boback	Re-elected	Democratic	Laura Dickson	4,603	27.03
118	Democratic	Mike Carroll	Re-elected	Democratic	Mike Carroll	12,209	100.00
119	Democratic	Jerry Mullery	Re-elected	Democratic	Jerry Mullery	9,995	100.00
120	Democratic	Phyllis Mundy	Retired	Republican	Aaron Kaufer	9,514	56.01
120	Democratic	Phyllis Mundy	Retired	Democratic	Eileen Cipriani	7,472	43.99
121	Democratic	Eddie Day Pashinski	Re-elected	Democratic	Eddie Day Pashinski	6,928	67.75
121	Democratic	Eddie Day Pashinski	Re-elected	Libertarian	Betsy Summers	3,298	32.25
122	Republican	Doyle Heffley	Re-elected	Republican	Doyle Heffley	10,427	64.49
122	Republican	Doyle Heffley	Re-elected	Democratic	Patricia Borger	5,741	35.51
123	Democratic	Neal Goodman	Re-elected	Democratic	Neal Goodman	11,290	100.0
124	Republican	Jerry Knowles	Re-elected	Republican	Jerry Knowles	15,532	100.00
125	Republican	Mike Tobash	Re-elected	Republican	Mike Tobash	14,017	100.00
126	Democratic	Mark Rozzi	Re-elected	Democratic	Mark Rozzi	10,687	100.00
127	Democratic	Tom Caltagirone	Re-elected	Democratic	Tom Caltagirone	5,156	100.00
128	Republican	Mark Gillen	Re-elected	Republican	Mark Gillen	15,264	100.00
129	Republican	Jim Cox	Re-elected	Republican	Jim Cox	14,085	100.00
130	Republican	David Maloney	Re-elected	Republican	David Maloney	11,117	62.00
130	Republican	David Maloney	Re-elected	Democratic	David Kessler	6,851	38.00
131	Republican	Justin Simmons	Re-elected	Republican	Justin Simmons	12,055	61.06
131	Republican	Justin Simmons	Re-elected	Democratic	Michael Beyer	7,688	38.94
132	Democratic	Mike Schlossberg	Re-elected	Democratic	Mike Schlossberg	7,899	100.00
133	Democratic	Dan McNeill	Re-elected	Democratic	Dan McNeill	7,568	55.09
133	Democratic	Dan McNeill	Re-elected	Republican	David Molony	6,170	44.91
134	Republican	Ryan Mackenzie	Re-elected	Republican	Ryan Mackenzie	14,448	100.00
135	Democratic	Steve Samuelson	Re-elected	Democratic	Steve Samuelson	9,387	100.00
136	Democratic	Bob Freeman	Re-elected	Democratic	Bob Freeman	9,131	100.00
137	Republican	Joe Emrick	Re-elected	Republican	Joe Emrick	11,825	100.00
138	Republican	Marcia Hahn	Re-elected	Republican	Marcia Hahn	12,898	66.32
138	Republican	Marcia Hahn	Re-elected	Democratic	Leslie Altieri	6,551	33.68
139	Republican	Mike Peifer	Re-elected	Republican	Mike Peifer	12,828	100.00
140	Democratic	John Galloway	Re-elected	Democratic	John Galloway	11,530	100.00
141	Democratic	Tina Davis	Re-elected	Democratic	Tina Davis	10,233	70.61
141	Democratic	Tina Davis	Re-elected	Republican	Joseph Lippolis	4,260	29.39
142	Republican	Frank Farry	Re-elected	Republican	Frank Farry	14,758	65.20
142	Republican	Frank Farry	Re-elected	Democratic	Regina Kiley	7,878	34.80
143	Republican	Marguerite Quinn	Re-elected	Republican	Marguerite Quinn	17,107	100.00
144	Republican	Kathy Watson	Re-elected	Republican	Kathy Watson	14,907	100.00
145	Republican	Paul Clymer	Retired	Republican	Craig Staats	11,268	58.74
145	Republican	Paul Clymer	Retired	Democratic	Karen Chellew	7,914	41.26
146	Democratic	Mark Painter	Defeated	Republican	Tom Quigley	8,840	52.15
146	Democratic	Mark Painter	Defeated	Democratic	Mark Painter	8,111	47.85
147	Republican	Marcy Toepel	Re-elected	Republican	Marcy Toepel	13,064	100.00
148	Democratic	Mary Jo Daley	Re-elected	Democratic	Mary Jo Daley	14,726	61.97
148	Democratic	Mary Jo Daley	Re-elected	Republican	Ed Flocco	9,039	38.03
149	Democratic	Tim Briggs	Re-elected	Democratic	Tim Briggs	13,716	100.00
150	Republican	Mike Vereb	Re-elected	Republican	Mike Vereb	11,964	63.89
150	Republican	Mike Vereb	Re-elected	Democratic	David McKenzie	6,763	36.11
151	Republican	Todd Stephens	Re-elected	Republican	Todd Stephens	13,541	100.00
152	Republican	Tom Murt	Re-elected	Republican	Tom Murt	14,905	100.00
153	Democratic	Madeleine Dean	Re-elected	Democratic	Madeleine Dean	16,984	100.00
154	Democratic	Steve McCarter	Re-elected	Democratic	Steve McCarter	17,553	73.50
154	Democratic	Steve McCarter	Re-elected	Republican	Robert Gillies	8,143	26.50
155	Republican	Becky Corbin	Re-elected	Republican	Becky Corbin	12,809	60.29
155	Republican	Becky Corbin	Re-elected	Democratic	James Burns	8,435	39.71
156	Republican	Dan Truitt	Re-elected	Republican	Dan Truitt	12,429	59.82
156	Republican	Dan Truitt	Re-elected	Democratic	Sandra Snyder	8,350	40.18
157	Republican	Warren Kampf	Re-elected	Republican	Warren Kampf	11,694	55.05
157	Republican	Warren Kampf	Re-elected	Democratic	Marian Moskowitz	9,547	44.95
158	Republican	Chris Ross	Re-elected	Republican	Chris Ross	11,350	58.26
158	Republican	Chris Ross	Re-elected	Democratic	Susan Rzucidlo	8,130	41.74
159	Democratic	Thaddeus Kirkland	Re-elected	Democratic	Thaddeus Kirkland	9,281	70.51
159	Democratic	Thaddeus Kirkland	Re-elected	Republican	Michael Ciach	3,881	29.49
160	Republican	Steve Barrar	Re-elected	Republican	Steve Barrar	13,303	62.61
160	Republican	Steve Barrar	Re-elected	Democratic	Whitney Hoffman	7,944	37.39
161	Republican	Joe Hackett	Re-elected	Republican	Joe Hackett	12,916	55.93
161	Republican	Joe Hackett	Re-elected	Democratic	Leanne Krueger-Braneky	10,176	44.07
162	Republican	Nick Miccarelli	Re-elected	Republican	Nick Miccarelli	17,902	100.00
163	Republican	Nick Micozzie	Retired	Republican	James Santora	11,644	53.55
163	Republican	Nick Micozzie	Retired	Democratic	Vincent Rongione	10,100	46.45
164	Democratic	Margo Davidson	Re-elected	Democratic	Margo Davidson	12,272	80.06
164	Democratic	Margo Davidson	Re-elected	Republican	Mohammad Siddiqui	8,339	19.94
165	Republican	Bill Adolph	Re-elected	Republican	Bill Adolph	15,765	64.66
165	Republican	Bill Adolph	Re-elected	Democratic	Charles Hadley	8,615	35.34
166	Democratic	Greg Vitali	Re-elected	Democratic	Greg Vitali	14,325	63.11
166	Democratic	Greg Vitali	Re-elected	Republican	Sarah Armstrong	8,375	36.89
167	Republican	Duane Milne	Re-elected	Republican	Duane Milne	13,439	61.39
167	Republican	Duane Milne	Re-elected	Democratic	Anne Crowley	8,453	38.61
168	Republican	Tom Killion	Re-elected	Republican	Tom Killion	16,397	100.00
169	Democratic	Ed Neilson	Re-districted	Republican	Kate Klunk	14,347	100.00
170	Democratic	Brendan Boyle	Re-elected	Democratic	Brendan Boyle	10,707	100.00
171	Republican	Kerry Benninghoff	Re-elected	Republican	Kerry Benninghoff	16,735	100.00
172	Democratic	Kevin Boyle	Re-elected	Democratic	Kevin Boyle	11,499	100.00
173	Democratic	Mike McGeehan	Retired	Democratic	Michael Driscoll	8,360	67.05
173	Democratic	Mike McGeehan	Retired	Republican	Michael Tomlinson	4,109	32.95
174	Democratic	John Sabatina	Re-elected	Democratic	John Sabatina	10,617	100.00
175	Democratic	Mike O'Brien	Re-elected	Democratic	Mike O'Brien	12,394	100.00
176	Republican	Mario Scavello	Elected to State Senate	Republican	Jack Rader	8,217	60.26
176	Republican	Mario Scavello	Elected to State Senate	Democratic	Hope Smith	5,420	39.74
177	Republican	John Taylor	Re-elected	Republican	John Taylor	9,042	100.00
178	Republican	Scott Petri	Re-elected	Republican	Scott Petri	17,098	100.00
179	Democratic	James Clay	Defeated in primary	Democratic	Jason Dawkins	9,867	100.00
180	Democratic	Angel Cruz	Re-elected	Democratic	Angel Cruz	5,827	100.00
181	Democratic	Curtis Thomas	Re-elected	Democratic	Curtis Thomas	12,988	100.00
182	Democratic	Brian Sims	Re-elected	Democratic	Brian Sims	15,808	100.00
183	Republican	Julie Harhart	Re-elected	Republican	Julie Harhart	10,261	60.94
183	Republican	Julie Harhart	Re-elected	Democratic	Terri Powell	5,061	30.06
183	Republican	Julie Harhart	Re-elected	Independent	Michael Molovinsky	1,515	9.00
184	Democratic	Bill Keller	Re-elected	Democratic	Bill Keller	11,758	100.00
185	Democratic	Maria Donatucci	Re-elected	Democratic	Maria Donatucci	14,208	100.00
186	Democratic	Jordan Harris	Re-elected	Democratic	Jordan Harris	16,070	100.00
187	Republican	Gary Day	Re-elected	Republican	Gary Day	13,045	100.00
188	Democratic	Jim Roebuck	Re-elected	Democratic	Jim Roebuck	13,030	88.97
188	Democratic	Jim Roebuck	Re-elected	Republican	Ernest Adkins	1,615	11.03
189	Republican	Rosemary Brown	Re-elected	Republican	Rosemary Brown	8,033	63.07
189	Republican	Rosemary Brown	Re-elected	Democratic	Elizabeth Forrest	4,704	36.93
190	Democratic	Vanessa Brown	Re-elected	Democratic	Vanessa Brown	16,446	95.73
190	Democratic	Vanessa Brown	Re-elected	Green	Glenn Davis	734	4.27
191	Democratic	Ronald Waters	Re-elected	Democratic	Ronald Waters	14,948	100.00
192	Democratic	Louise Bishop	Re-elected	Democratic	Louise Bishop	18,829	100.00
193	Republican	Will Tallman	Re-elected	Republican	Will Tallman	12,889	73.98
193	Republican	Will Tallman	Re-elected	Democratic	Paul Bart	4,534	26.02
194	Democratic	Pamela DeLissio	Re-elected	Democratic	Pamela DeLissio	12,981	71.70
194	Democratic	Pamela DeLissio	Re-elected	Republican	William Pounds	5,124	28.30
195	Democratic	Michelle Brownlee	Re-elected	Democratic	Michelle Brownlee	16,887	100.00
196	Republican	Seth Grove	Re-elected	Republican	Seth Grove	15,396	100.00
197	Democratic	J. P. Miranda	Defeated in primary	Democratic	Leslie Acosta	10,754	100.00
198	Democratic	Rosita Youngblood	Re-elected	Democratic	Rosita Youngblood	16,978	100.00
199	Republican	Stephen Bloom	Re-elected	Republican	Stephen Bloom	11,368	64.81
199	Republican	Stephen Bloom	Re-elected	Democratic	Jill Bartoli	6,172	35.19
200	Democratic	Cherelle Parker	Re-elected	Democratic	Cherelle Parker	24,726	100.00
201	Democratic	Stephen Kinsey	Re-elected	Democratic	Stephen Kinsey	17,617	100.00
202	Democratic	Mark Cohen	Re-elected	Democratic	Mark Cohen	9,209	100.00
203	Democratic	Dwight Evans	Re-elected	Democratic	Dwight Evans	17,485	100.00

Source: Pennsylvania Department of State

== See also ==
- Pennsylvania House of Representatives election, 2018

== See also ==
- Pennsylvania House of Representatives election, 2018
