= Representative Smith =

Representative Smith may refer to numerous representatives.

== United States representatives ==
=== A ===
- Abraham Herr Smith (1815–1894), U.S. Representative from Pennsylvania
- Adam Smith (Washington politician) (born 1965), U.S. Representative from Washington
- Addison T. Smith (1862–1956), U.S. Representative from Idaho
- Adrian Smith (politician) (born 1970), U.S. Representative from Nebraska
- Albert Smith (Maine politician) (1793–1867)
- Albert Smith (New York politician) (1805–1870), U.S. Representative from New York
- Albert L. Smith Jr. (1931–1997), U.S. Representative from Alabama
- Arthur Smith (congressman) (1785–1853), U.S. Representative from Virginia

=== B ===
- Ballard Smith, U.S. Representative from Virginia
- Bernard Smith (New Jersey politician) (1776–1835), U.S. Representative from New Jersey
- Bob Smith (New Hampshire politician) (born 1941)

=== C ===
- Caleb B. Smith (1808–1864), U.S. Representative from Indiana
- Charles Bennett Smith (1870–1939), U.S. Representative from New York
- Chris Smith (New Jersey politician) (born 1953), U.S. Representative from New Jersey
- Charles Brooks Smith (1844–1899), U.S. Representative from West Virginia
- Clyde H. Smith (1876–1940)

=== D ===
- David Highbaugh Smith (1854–1928)
- Denny Smith (born 1938), U.S. Representative from Oregon
- Dietrich C. Smith (1840–1914)

=== E ===
- Edward H. Smith (politician) (1809–1885), U.S. Representative from New York

=== F ===
- Francis Ormand Jonathan Smith (1806–1876)
- Francis R. Smith (1911–1982), U.S. Representative from Pennsylvania
- Frank Ellis Smith (1918–1997), U.S. Representative from Mississippi
- Frank L. Smith (1867–1950)
- Frank Owens Smith (1859–1924), U.S. Representative from Maryland
- Frederick Cleveland Smith (1884–1956)

=== G ===
- George Smith (Pennsylvania politician), U.S. Representative from Pennsylvania
- George J. Smith (1859–1913), U.S. Representative from New York
- George Luke Smith (1837–1884), U.S. Representative from Louisiana
- George Ross Smith (1864–1952)
- George Washington Smith (politician) (1846–1907)
- Gerrit Smith (1797–1874), U.S. Representative from New York
- Gomer Griffith Smith (1896–1953), U.S. Representative from Oklahoma
- Green Clay Smith (1826–1895)

=== H ===
- H. Allen Smith (California politician) (1909–1998), U.S. Representative from California
- Henry Smith (Wisconsin politician) (1838–1916), U.S. Representative from Wisconsin
- Henry C. Smith (politician) (1856–1911), U.S. Representative from Michigan
- Henry P. Smith III (1911–1995), U.S. Representative from New York
- Hezekiah Bradley Smith (1816–1887), U.S. Representative from New Jersey
- Hiram Y. Smith (1843–1894), U.S. Representative from Iowa
- Horace B. Smith (1826–1888), U.S. Representative from New York
- Howard W. Smith (1883–1976), U.S. Representative from Virginia

=== I ===
- Isaac Smith (New Jersey politician) (1740–1807), U.S. Representative from New Jersey
- Isaac Smith (Pennsylvania politician) (1761–1834), U.S. Representative from Pennsylvania
- Israel Smith (1759–1810), U.S. Representative from Vermont

=== J ===
- J. Hyatt Smith (1824–1886), U.S. Representative from New York
- J. Joseph Smith (1904–1980), U.S. Representative from Connecticut
- James Strudwick Smith (1787–1852), U.S. Representative from North Carolina
- James Vernon Smith (1926–1973), U.S. Representative from Oklahoma
- Jason Smith (American politician) (born 1980), U.S. Representative from Missouri
- Jedediah K. Smith (1770–1828)
- Jeremiah Smith (lawyer) (1759–1842)
- Joe L. Smith (1880–1962), U.S. Representative from West Virginia
- John Smith (New York politician, born 1752) (1752–1816), U.S. Representative from New York
- John Smith (Vermont politician) (1789–1858), U.S. Representative from Vermont
- John Smith (Virginia representative) (1750–1836), U.S. Representative from Virginia
- John Ambler Smith (1847–1892), U.S. Representative from Virginia
- John Armstrong Smith (1814–1892)
- John Cotton Smith (1765–1845), U.S. Representative from Connecticut
- John M. C. Smith (1853–1923), U.S. Representative from Michigan
- John Quincy Smith (1824–1901)
- John Speed Smith (1792–1854), U.S. Representative from Kentucky
- John T. Smith (congressman) (1801–1864), U.S. Representative from Pennsylvania
- John Walter Smith (1845–1925), U.S. Representative from Maryland
- Joseph Showalter Smith (1824–1884), U.S. Representative from Oregon
- Joseph F. Smith (Pennsylvania politician) (1920–1999), U.S. Representative from Pennsylvania
- Josiah Smith (1738–1803), U.S. Representative from Massachusetts

=== L ===
- Lamar Smith (born 1947), U.S. Representative from Texas
- Larkin I. Smith (1944–1989), U.S. Representative from Mississippi
- Lawrence H. Smith (1892–1958), U.S. Representative from Wisconsin
- Lawrence J. Smith (born 1941), U.S. Representative from Florida
- Linda Smith (American politician) (born 1950), U.S. Representative from Washington

=== M ===
- Madison Roswell Smith (1850–1919), U.S. Representative from Missouri
- Margaret Chase Smith (1897–1995)
- Martin F. Smith (1891–1954), U.S. Representative from Washington

=== N ===
- Nathaniel Smith (1762–1822), U.S. Representative from Connecticut
- Neal Edward Smith (1920–2021), U.S. Representative from Iowa
- Nick Smith (American politician) (born 1934), U.S. Representative from Michigan

=== O ===
- O'Brien Smith (c. 1756–1811), U.S. Representative from South Carolina
- Oliver H. Smith (1794–1859), U.S. Representative from Indiana

=== P ===
- Peter Plympton Smith (born 1945), U.S. Representative from Vermont

=== R ===
- Robert Freeman Smith (1931–2020), U.S. Representative from Oregon
- Robert Rhett Smith (1800–1876), U.S. Representative from South Carolina
- Robert Smith (Illinois politician) (1802–1867)

=== S ===
- Samuel Smith (Maryland politician) (1752–1839), U.S. Representative from Maryland
- Samuel Smith (New Hampshire politician) (1765–1842)
- Samuel Smith (Pennsylvania politician), U.S. Representative from Pennsylvania
- Samuel A. Smith (1795–1861), U.S. Representative from Pennsylvania
- Samuel Axley Smith (1822–1863), U.S. Representative from Tennessee
- Samuel William Smith (1852–1931), U.S. Representative from Michigan
- Sylvester C. Smith (1858–1913), U.S. Representative from California

=== T ===
- Thomas Smith (Indiana politician) (1799–1876), U.S. Representative from Indiana
- Thomas Smith (Pennsylvania congressman) (1773–1846), U.S. Representative from Pennsylvania
- Thomas Alexander Smith (1850–1932), U.S. Representative from Maryland
- Thomas Francis Smith (1865–1923), U.S. Representative from New York
- Thomas Vernor Smith (1890–1964)
- Truman Smith (1791–1884), U.S. Representative from Connecticut

=== V ===
- Virginia Smith (politician) (1911–2006), U.S. Representative from Nebraska

=== W ===
- Walter I. Smith (1862–1922), U.S. Representative from Iowa
- William Smith (Maryland politician) (1728–1814), U.S. Representative from Maryland
- William Smith (South Carolina representative) (1751–1837), U.S. Representative from South Carolina
- William Smith (Virginia governor) (1797–1887), U.S. Representative from Virginia
- William Smith (Virginia representative), U.S. Representative from Virginia
- William Alden Smith (1859–1932), U.S. Representative from Michigan
- William Alexander Smith (politician) (1828–1888), U.S. Representative from North Carolina
- William Ephraim Smith (1829–1890), U.S. Representative from Georgia
- William Jay Smith (Tennessee politician) (1823–1913), U.S. Representative from Tennessee
- William Loughton Smith (1758–1812), U.S. Representative from South Carolina
- William N. H. Smith (1812–1889), U.S. Representative from North Carolina
- William Orlando Smith (1859–1932), U.S. Representative from Pennsylvania
- William Robert Smith (1863–1924), U.S. Representative from Texas
- William Russell Smith (1815–1896), U.S. Representative from Alabama
- William Stephens Smith (1755–1816), U.S. Representative from New York
- Wint Smith (1892–1976), U.S. Representative from Kansas
- Worthington Curtis Smith (1823–1894), U.S. Representative from Vermont

== U.S. state representatives ==
=== Alabama ===
- Charles Spencer Smith (1852–1923)
- Ivan Smith (politician)
- Phil Smith (Alabama politician) (1931–2020)
- Robert Hardy Smith (1813–1878)
- William Russell Smith (1815–1896)

=== Alaska ===
- Sally Smith (politician) (born 1945)

=== Arizona ===
- Austin Smith (politician) (born 1995)
- David Burnell Smith (1941–2014)
- Steve Smith (Arizona politician)
- Tom Smith (Arizona politician) (1927–2014)

=== Arkansas ===
- Brandt Smith (born 1959)
- Charles F. Smith (politician) (1912–1962)
- Fred Smith (Arkansas politician)
- Ray S. Smith Jr. (1924–2007)

=== Connecticut ===
- Asa Smith (politician) (1829–1907)
- Frank Smith (Connecticut politician)
- Edwin O. Smith (died 1960)
- Nathaniel Smith (1762–1822)
- Perry Smith (politician) (1783–1852)
- Richard A. Smith (Connecticut politician)
- Truman Smith (1791–1884)

=== Delaware ===
- Melanie George Smith (born 1972)
- Michael F. Smith

=== Florida ===
- Carlos Guillermo Smith (born 1980)
- Chris Smith (Florida politician) (born 1970)
- Chuck Smith (Florida politician) (born 1928)
- David Smith (Florida politician) (born 1960)
- Eric Smith (Florida politician) (born 1942)
- Frank Smith (Florida settler)
- Jimmie Todd Smith (born 1965)
- Kelley Smith (born 1946)
- Ken Smith (American politician) (born 1926)
- Lawrence J. Smith (born 1941)

=== Georgia ===
- George L. Smith (Georgia politician) (1912–1973)
- George T. Smith (1916–2010)
- James Monroe Smith (Georgia planter) (1839–1915)
- Lynn Smith (politician) (born 1945)
- Michael Smith (Georgia politician)
- Richard H. Smith (born 1945)
- Tyler Smith (Georgia politician) (born 1990)
- Vance Smith (born 1952)

=== Idaho ===
- Elaine Smith (Idaho politician)
- Leon Smith (politician) (born 1937)

=== Illinois ===
- Calvin Smith (politician) (1907–1968)
- Derrick Smith (politician)
- Dietrich C. Smith (1840–1914)
- Michael K. Smith (Illinois politician) (1966–2014)
- Nicholas Smith (Illinois politician)
- Ora Smith (1884–1965)
- Robert Smith (Illinois politician) (1802–1867)
- William Smith (Latter Day Saints) (1811–1893)
- William M. Smith

=== Indiana ===
- Caleb B. Smith (1808–1864)
- Marcus C. Smith (1825–1900)
- Milo E. Smith (born 1950)
- Oliver H. Smith (1794–1859)
- Thomas Smith (Indiana politician) (1799–1876)
- Vernon Smith (Indiana politician) (born 1944)

=== Iowa ===
- Israel A. Smith (1876–1958)
- Jeff Smith (Iowa politician) (born 1967)
- Mark Smith (Iowa politician) (born 1952)
- Ras Smith (born 1987)

=== Kansas ===
- Adam Smith (Kansas politician)
- Chuck Smith (Kansas politician) (born 1951)
- Eric Smith (Kansas politician) (born 1966)
- Ira Harvey Smith (1815–1883)

=== Kentucky ===
- Brandon Smith (politician) (born 1967)
- David Highbaugh Smith (1854–1928)
- Green Clay Smith (1826–1895)
- John Speed Smith (1792–1854)
- Tom Smith (Kentucky politician)

=== Louisiana ===
- Gary Smith Jr. (born 1972)
- George Luke Smith (1837–1884)
- James Peyton Smith (1925–2006)
- Jasper K. Smith (1905–1992)
- John R. Smith (politician, born 1945)
- Patricia Haynes Smith (born 1946)

=== Maine ===
- Albert Smith (Maine politician) (1793–1867)
- Clyde H. Smith (1876–1940)
- Douglas Smith (Maine politician) (born 1946)
- Katrina Smith
- Ormandel Smith (1842–1915)
- Samuel E. Smith (1788–1860)

=== Massachusetts ===
- George Edwin Smith (1849–1919)
- Josiah Smith (1738–1803)
- Samuel E. Smith (1788–1860)
- Stephen Stat Smith (born 1955)

=== Maryland ===
- Stephanie M. Smith (born 1981)

=== Michigan ===
- Alma Wheeler Smith (born 1941)
- Calvin Smith (Michigan politician) (died 1838)
- Charles Wallace Smith (1864–1939)
- George A. Smith (Michigan politician) (1825–1893)
- James F. Smith (Michigan politician) (1923–2007)
- Joseph Smith (Michigan politician) (1809–1880)
- Nick Smith (American politician) (born 1934)
- Virgil C. Smith (born 1947)
- Virgil Smith Jr. (born 1979)

=== Minnesota ===
- Andy Smith (Minnesota politician) (born 1991)
- Dennis Smith (politician)
- Edward Everett Smith (1861–1931)
- George Ross Smith (1864–1952)
- Steve Smith (Minnesota politician) (1949–2014)

=== Mississippi ===
- Ferr Smith (born 1941)
- Jeff Smith (Mississippi politician) (born 1949)
- Troy Smith (politician) (born 1965)

=== Missouri ===
- Clem Smith (politician)
- Cody Smith
- David Tyson Smith
- Jason Smith (American politician) (born 1980)
- Joe Smith (Missouri politician) (born 1970s)
- Mellcene Thurman Smith (1871–1957)
- Tanner Smith (politician)
- Travis Smith (politician)

=== Montana ===
- Bridget Smith (politician)
- Cary Smith (politician) (born 1950)
- Frank Smith (Montana politician) (born 1942)
- Laura Smith (Montana politician)

=== New Hampshire ===
- Jedediah K. Smith (1770–1828)
- Jonathan Smith (politician)
- Juliet Smith
- Geoffrey Smith (New Hampshire politician)
- Kevin H. Smith (born 1977)
- Marjorie Smith (born 1941)
- Steven D. Smith (born 1964)
- Timothy Smith (American politician) (born 1980)

=== New Mexico ===
- James Smith (New Mexico politician)

=== New York ===
- Douglas M. Smith (born 1990)

=== North Carolina ===
- Benjamin Smith (North Carolina politician) (1756–1826)
- Carson Smith (politician) (born 1960s)
- Charles Smith (North Carolina politician)
- James Strudwick Smith (1787–1852)
- Kandie Smith (born 1969)
- McNeill Smith (1918–2011)
- Raymond Smith Jr. (born 1961)
- William N. H. Smith (1812–1889)
- Willis Smith (1887–1953)

=== Ohio ===
- Geoffrey C. Smith (politician)
- Harry Clay Smith (1863–1941)
- Jeffery Todd Smith
- John Armstrong Smith (1814–1892)
- John Quincy Smith (1824–1901)
- Kent Smith (American politician) (born 1966)
- Larry G. Smith (1914–1992)
- Ryan Smith (Ohio politician) (born 1973)
- Shirley Smith (politician) (born 1950)

=== Oklahoma ===
- David Smith (Oklahoma politician)
- Jerry L. Smith (1943–2015)

=== Oregon ===
- David Brock Smith
- Greg Smith (Oregon politician) (born 1968)
- Jefferson Smith (politician) (born 1973)
- Norm Smith (American politician) (born 1947)
- Patti Smith (politician) (1946–2017)
- Tootie Smith (born 1957)
- Wesley O. Smith (1878–1951)

=== Oregon ===
- Greg Smith (Oregon politician) (born 1968)

=== Pennsylvania ===
- Abraham Herr Smith (1815–1894)
- Barbara McIlvaine Smith (born 1950)
- Brian Smith (Pennsylvania politician)
- Bruce I. Smith (born 1934)
- Charles C. Smith (Pennsylvania politician) (1908–1970)
- Clark S. Smith (1912–2014)
- Earl H. Smith (1909–1987)
- Isaac Smith (Pennsylvania politician) (1761–1834)
- Ismail Smith-Wade-El
- Kenneth J. Smith
- L. Eugene Smith (1921–2019)
- Matthew H. Smith (born 1972)
- Samuel H. Smith (politician) (born 1955)
- Thomas Smith (Pennsylvania congressman) (1773–1846)
- Thomas Smith (Pennsylvania judge) (1745–1809)
- Thomas B. Smith (mayor) (1869–1949)
- William Orlando Smith (1859–1932)
- William Rudolph Smith (1787–1868)

=== Rhode Island ===
- Edward J. Smith (American politician) (1927–2010)
- Mary Ann Shallcross Smith (born 1952)
- Murrell Smith Jr. (born 1968)

=== South Carolina ===
- Charles Aurelius Smith (1861–1916)
- Clary Hood Smith (1928–2019)
- Ellison D. Smith (1864–1944)
- G. Murrell Smith Jr. (born 1968)
- Garry R. Smith (born 1957)
- J. Roland Smith (born 1933)
- James E. Smith Jr. (born 1967)
- Mark Smith (South Carolina politician)
- O'Brien Smith (1750s–1811)
- W. Douglas Smith (born 1958)
- William Smith (South Carolina politician, born 1762) (1762–1840)
- William Loughton Smith (1758–1812)

=== South Dakota ===
- Jamie Smith (politician)

=== Tennessee ===
- Eddie Smith (politician) (born 1979)
- Robin Smith (politician) (born 1963)

=== Texas ===
- Burrell P. Smith (1823–1859)
- Lamar Smith (born 1947)
- Preston Smith (governor) (1912–2003)
- Reggie Smith (Texas politician)
- Robert Lloyd Smith (1861–1942)
- Wayne Smith (Texas politician) (born 1943)

=== Vermont ===
- Brian Smith (Vermont politician)
- Charles Manley Smith (1868–1937)
- Charles Plympton Smith (born 1954)
- Edward Curtis Smith (1854–1935)
- Harvey Smith (American politician) (born 1945)
- Heman R. Smith (1795–1861)
- Israel Smith (1759–1810)
- J. Gregory Smith (1818–1891)
- John Smith (Vermont politician) (1789–1858)
- Levi P. Smith (1885–1970)
- Noah Smith (judge) (1756–1812)
- Shap Smith (born 1965)
- Worthington Curtis Smith (1823–1894)

=== Washington ===
- Cleveland Smith (1853–1935)
- Hiram F. Smith (1829–1893)
- John B. Smith (Washington politician) (1837–1917)
- Linda Smith (American politician) (born 1950)
- Norma Smith
- Sam Smith (American politician) (1922–1995)

=== West Virginia ===
- Doug Smith (politician) (born 1967)

=== Wyoming ===
- Nels J. Smith (born 1939)
- Nels H. Smith (1884–1976)
- Scott Smith (Wyoming politician)

== Hawaiian Kingdom representatives ==
- William Owen Smith (1848–1929)

== See also ==
- List of people with surname Smith
- Senator Smith (disambiguation)
