= James A. Goodman =

American politician (born 1936)

Member of the Pennsylvania House of Representatives from the 123rd district
- In office 1969–1980
- Preceded by: District created
- Succeeded by: Edward Lucyk

Member of the Pennsylvania House of Representatives from the Schuylkill County district
- In office 1965–1968

Personal details
- Born: June 12, 1936 (age 90) New Boston
- Party: Democratic

James A. Goodman (born June 12, 1936) is a former Democratic member of the Pennsylvania House of Representatives.
