= Kyle Mullins =

American politician

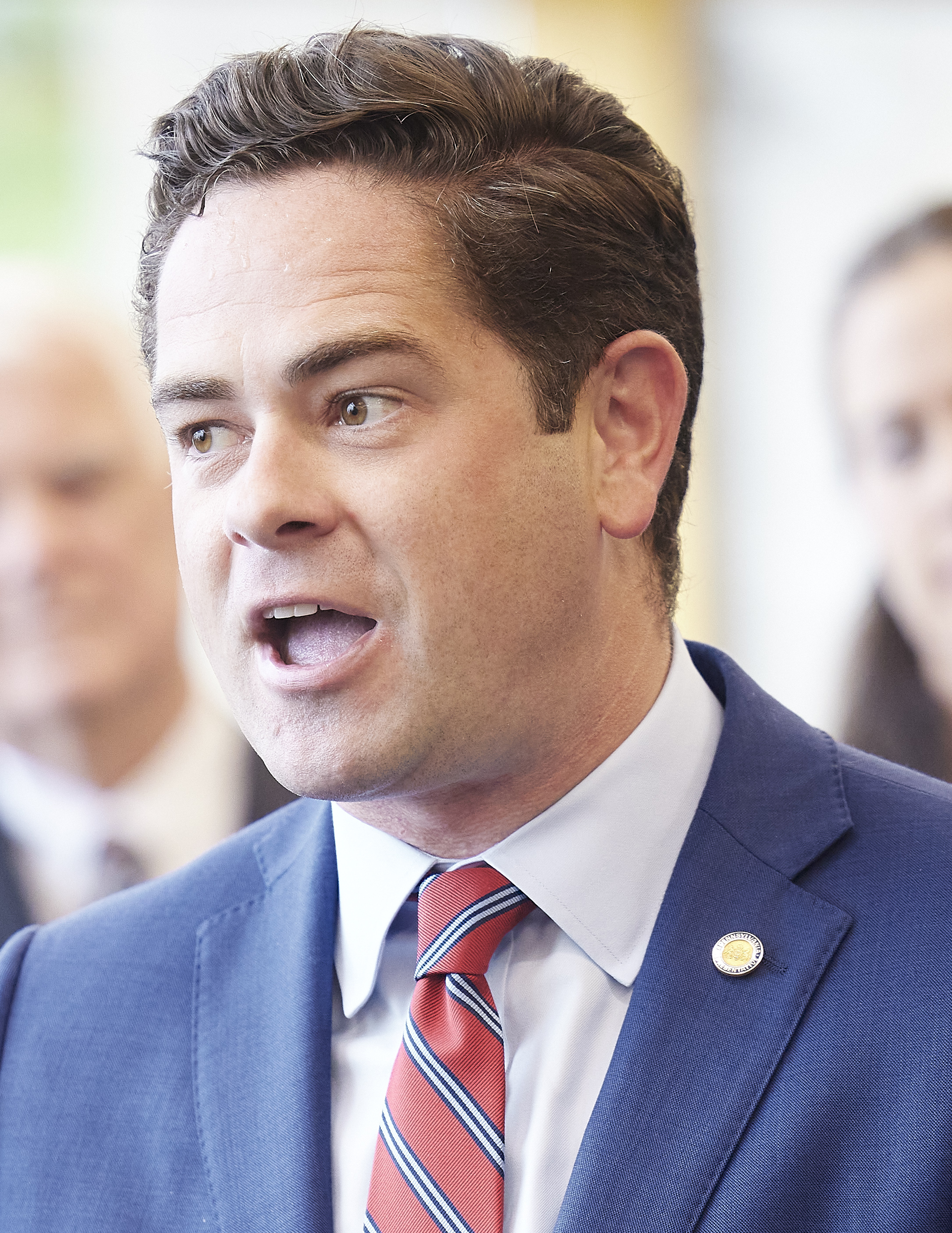

Member of the Pennsylvania House of Representatives from the 112th district
- Incumbent
- Assumed office December 1, 2018
- Preceded by: Kevin Haggerty

Personal details
- Born: Peckville, Pennsylvania, U.S.
- Party: Democratic
- Spouse: Lauren
- Children: 2
- Education: West Chester University

Kyle J. Mullins is an American politician. He is a Democrat representing District 112 in the Pennsylvania House of Representatives.

== Political career ==
In 2018, Mullins ran to represent District 112 in the Pennsylvania House of Representatives, replacing former representative Kevin Haggerty, who decided not to run for another term. Mullins won a five-way Democratic primary with 43.3% of the vote, and went on to win the general election against Republican Ernest Lemoncelli. Mullins ran for re-election in 2020.

As of June 2020, Mullins sits on the following committees:

- Committee on Committees
- Game & Fisheries
- Professional Licensure
- Transportation

=== Electoral record ===
2018 Democratic primary: Pennsylvania House of Representatives, District 112
Party	Candidate	Votes	%
Democratic	Kyle Mullins	4,240	43.3%
Democratic	Thomas Carlucci	2,733	27.9%
Democratic	Randy Castellani	1,760	18.0%
Democratic	Francis McHale	673	6.9%
Democratic	Robert Castellani	385	3.9%

2018 general election: Pennsylvania House of Representatives, District 112
Party	Candidate	Votes	%
Democratic	Kyle Mullins	17,081	69.7%
Republican	Ernest Lemoncelli	7,428	30.3%
