= William H. Yohn Jr. =

American judge (1935–2026)

William Hendricks Yohn Jr.

Senior Judge of the United States District Court for the Eastern District of Pennsylvania
- In office November 20, 2003 – January 3, 2026

Judge of the United States District Court for the Eastern District of Pennsylvania
- In office September 16, 1991 – November 20, 2003
- Appointed by: George H. W. Bush
- Preceded by: John P. Fullam
- Succeeded by: Gene E. K. Pratter

Member of the Pennsylvania House of Representatives from the 146th district
- In office 1969–1980
- Preceded by: District created
- Succeeded by: Robert Reber

Personal details
- Born: William Hendricks Yohn Jr. November 20, 1935 Pottstown, Pennsylvania, U.S.
- Died: January 3, 2026 (aged 90)
- Party: Republican
- Education: Princeton University (BA); Yale University (JD)

William Hendricks Yohn Jr. (November 20, 1935 – January 3, 2026) was a United States district judge of the United States District Court for the Eastern District of Pennsylvania.

== Life and career ==
Yohn was born in Pottstown, Pennsylvania on November 20, 1935. Yohn graduated from Princeton University with a Bachelor of Arts degree in 1957 and received his Juris Doctor from the Yale Law School in 1960. He also attended the National Judicial College in Reno, Nevada. He served in the United States Marine Corps from 1960 to 1961, and continued in the reserves until 1965. He was in private practice in Pottstown from 1961 to 1981. During that time, Yohn served as an assistant district attorney from 1962 to 1965 and as a Republican Party member of the Pennsylvania House of Representatives from 1968 to 1980. In 1981 he was elected as a judge on the court of common pleas for Montgomery County, a position he held until 1991.

=== Federal judicial service ===
Yohn was nominated by President George H. W. Bush on June 14, 1991, to a seat on the United States District Court for the Eastern District of Pennsylvania vacated by Judge John P. Fullam. He was confirmed by the United States Senate on September 12, 1991, and received commission on September 16, 1991. He assumed senior status on November 20, 2003. He died on January 3, 2026.

==== Vincent Fumo case ====
Yohn was assigned to be the Judge during the Vincent Fumo corruption trial in Philadelphia Federal Court in September 2008. On September 14, 2008, The Philadelphia Inquirer announced that Yohn had been hospitalized. He had been suffering from a cough and had complained in court last week about viruslike symptoms. As of September 30, 2008, Yohn was replaced as the judge in the Fumo case.

=== Death ===
Yohn died on January 3, 2026, at the age of 90.

Legal offices
Preceded by John P. Fullam	Judge of the United States District Court for the Eastern District of Pennsylvania; 1991–2003	Succeeded by Gene E. K. Pratter
