= Pennsylvania House of Representatives, District 146 =

American legislative district

Pennsylvania's 146th State House of Representatives district
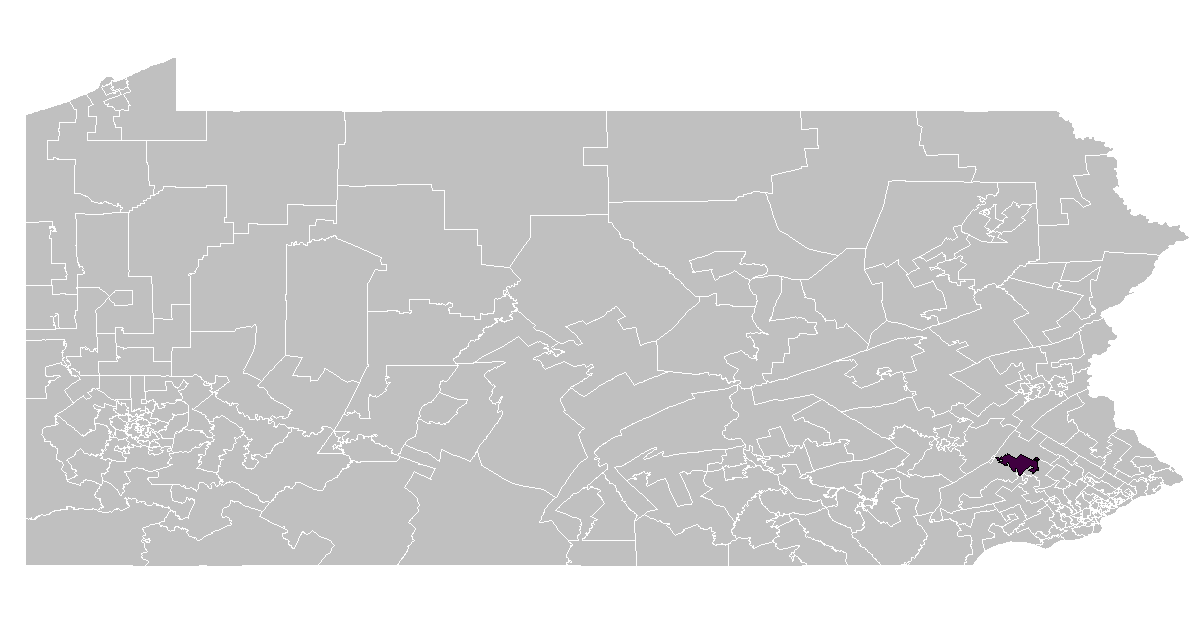
Representative
Joe Ciresi; D–Limerick Township
- Demographics: 87.4% White; 6.8% Black; 3.2% Hispanic
- Population (2011) • Citizens of voting age: 61,171; 45,381

The 146th Pennsylvania House of Representatives District is located in Southeastern Pennsylvania and has been represented since 2019 by Joe Ciresi.

== District profile ==
The 146th Pennsylvania House of Representatives District is located in Montgomery County. It is made up of the following areas:

- Limerick Township
- Lower Pottsgrove Township
- Perkiomen Township
- Pottstown (PART, Districts 03, 04, 05, 06 and 07 [PART, Division 02])
- Royersford
- Trappe

== Representatives ==
Representative	Party	Years	District home	Note
Prior to 1969, seats were apportioned by county.
William H. Yohn, Jr.	Republican	1969 – 1980		
Robert D. Reber, Jr.	Republican	1981 – 1998		
Mary Ann Dailey	Republican	1999 – 2004		
Tom Quigley	Republican	2005 – 2012	Royersford	
Mark Painter	Democrat	2013 – 2015	Limerick Township	
Tom Quigley	Republican	2015 – 2019	Royersford	
Joe Ciresi	Democrat	2019 – present	Limerick Township	Incumbent

== Recent election results ==
2010 Pennsylvania House of Representatives election, 146th district
Party	Candidate	Votes	%
Republican	Tom Quigley (incumbent)	11,060	56.18
Democratic	Mark Painter	8,625	43.82
Turnout		19,685	100
Margin of victory		2,435	12.36
Republican hold			

2012 Pennsylvania House of Representatives election, 146th district
Party	Candidate	Votes	%
Democratic	Mark Painter	14,888	50.35
Republican	Tom Quigley (incumbent)	14,680	49.65
Total votes		29,568	100.00
Margin of victory		208	0.7
Democratic gain from Republican			

2014 Pennsylvania House of Representatives election, 146th district
Party	Candidate	Votes	%
Republican	Tom Quigley	8,840	52.15
Democratic	Mark Painter (incumbent)	8,111	47.85
Total votes		16,951	100.00
Margin of victory		729	4.3
Republican gain from Democratic			

2016 Pennsylvania House of Representatives election, 146th district
Party	Candidate	Votes	%
Republican	Tom Quigley (incumbent)	15,060	51.15
Democratic	Joe Ciresi	14,381	48.45
Total votes		29,441	100.00
Margin of victory		679	2.7
Republican hold			

2018 Pennsylvania House of Representatives election, 146th district
Party	Candidate	Votes	%
Democratic	Joe Ciresi	14,093	55.51
Republican	Thomas J. Quigley (incumbent)	11,286	44.46
Write-in		7	0.03
Total votes		25,386	100.00
Democratic gain from Republican			

2020 Pennsylvania House of Representatives election, 146th district
Party	Candidate	Votes	%
Democratic	Joe Ciresi (incumbent)	20,681	56.84
Republican	Tom Neafcy	15,706	43.16
Total votes		36,387	100.00
Democratic hold			
