= Pennsylvania House of Representatives, District 123 =

American legislative district

Pennsylvania's 123rd State House of Representatives district
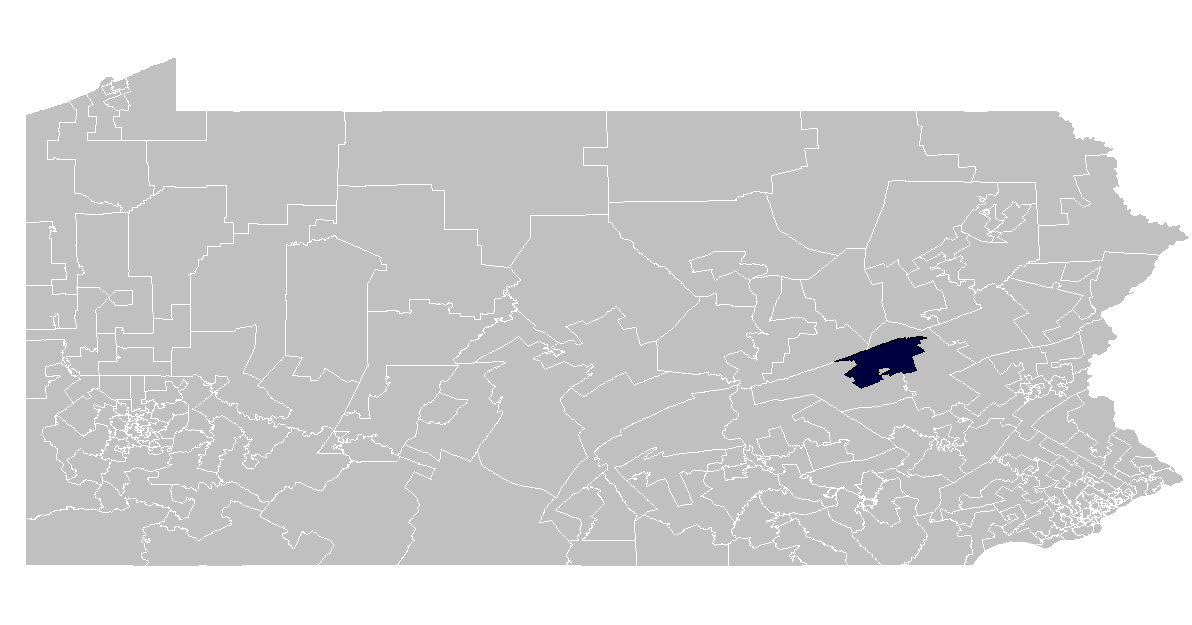
Representative
Timothy Twardzik; R–Butler Township, Schuylkill County
- Demographics: 90.5% White; 5.4% Black; 4.3% Hispanic
- Population (2011) • Citizens of voting age: 61,000; 49,639

The 123rd Pennsylvania House of Representatives District is in Northeastern Pennsylvania and has been represented by Timothy Twardzik since 2021.

== District profile ==
The 123rd Pennsylvania House of Representatives District is located in Schuylkill County and includes the following areas:

- Ashland (Schuylkill County portion)
- Blythe Township
- Branch Township
- Butler Township
- Cass Township
- Cressona
- East Norwegian Township
- Frackville
- Gilberton
- Girardville
- Gordon
- Mechanicsville
- Middleport
- Minersville
- Mount Carbon
- New Castle Township
- New Philadelphia
- North Manheim Township
- Norwegian Township
- Palo Alto
- Port Carbon
- Pottsville
- Schuylkill Haven
- St. Clair
- Wayne Township
- West Mahanoy Township

== Representatives ==
Representative	Party	Years	District home	Note
Prior to 1969, seats were apportioned by county.
James A. Goodman	Democrat	1969 – 1980		
Edward J. Lucyk	Democrat	1981 – 2002		
Neal Goodman	Democrat	2003 – 2020	Mahanoy City	
Timothy Twardzik	Republican	2021 – present	Butler Township, Pennsylvania	

== Recent election results ==
PA House election, 2010: Pennsylvania House, District 123
Party	Candidate	Votes	%	±%
Democratic	Neal Goodman	10,654	65.87	
Republican	Ettore Dicasimirro	5,520	34.13	
Margin of victory		5,134	31.74	
Turnout		16,174	100	

PA House election, 2012: Pennsylvania House, District 123
Party	Candidate	Votes	%	±%
Democratic	Neal Goodman	16,854	100.0	
Margin of victory		16,854		
Turnout		16,854	100	

PA House election, 2014: Pennsylvania House, District 123
Party	Candidate	Votes	%	±%
Democratic	Neal Goodman	11,290	100.0	
Margin of victory		11,290		
Turnout		11,290	100	

PA House election, 2016: Pennsylvania House, District 123
Party	Candidate	Votes	%	±%
Democratic	Neal Goodman	17,942	100	
Margin of victory		17,942		
Turnout		17,942	100	
