= Edward Lucyk =

American politician (1942–2025)

Edward J. Lucyk

Member of the Pennsylvania House of Representatives from the 123rd district
- In office January 6, 1981 – November 30, 2002
- Preceded by: James A. Goodman
- Succeeded by: Neal Goodman

Personal details
- Born: July 29, 1942 Mahanoy City, Pennsylvania, U.S.
- Died: July 7, 2025 (aged 82)
- Party: Democratic

Edward J. Lucyk (July 29, 1942 – July 7, 2025) was an American politician who was a Democratic member of the Pennsylvania House of Representatives.

== Life and career ==
Lucyk graduated from the Mahanoy Area High School in 1960. He graduated from the United States Military Academy in 1964 and earned an M.B.A. degree from George Washington University in 1969. He was first elected to represent the 123rd legislative district in the Pennsylvania House of Representatives in 1980, a position he held until his retirement prior to the 2002 election.

Lucyk died on 7 July 2025, at the age of 82.
