= Mark Painter =

American politician (born 1957)

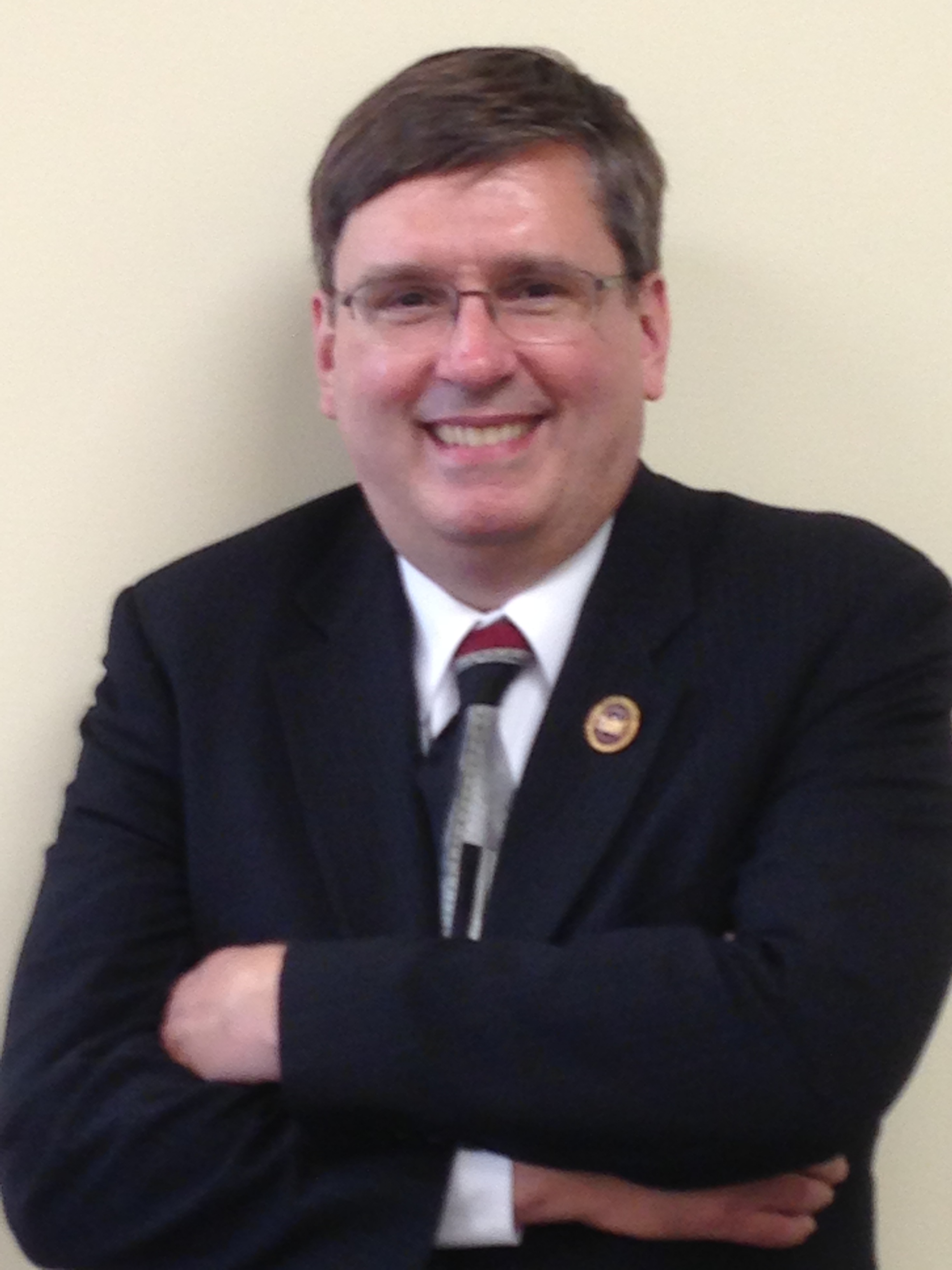

Member of the Pennsylvania House of Representatives from the 146th district
- In office January 1, 2013 – January 6, 2015
- Preceded by: Tom Quigley
- Succeeded by: Tom Quigley

Personal details
- Born: August 3, 1957 (age 69)
- Party: Democratic
- Spouse: Coleen
- Children: 4
- Education: University of Pennsylvania

Mark Painter (born August 3, 1957) is a former Democratic member of the Pennsylvania House of Representatives. He represented the 146th District from 2013 until 2015. The district is located in Montgomery County, including Limerick Township, Lower Pottsgrove Township, Perkiomen Township, Trappe, Royersford, and parts of Pottstown.

== Early life ==
Mark Painter was born in Stowe, Pennsylvania and graduated from Pottsgrove High School in 1974. He then attended the University of Pennsylvania, where he earned degrees in electrical engineering and law, graduating in 1978.

After his two sons were diagnosed with autism, Painter became concerned with the lack of access to special education programs. Along with his wife, he helped organize parents of special needs children to help develop new programs for students with autism. This experience led Mark into the field of special education law, where he represented parents advocating for better services from their school districts.

From 1998 to 2012, Painter served almost four terms as tax collector for Limerick Township, until he was elected to the House. He attends St. James Lutheran Church in Limerick, where he has also taught Sunday School. He is a lifetime member of the Limerick Historical Society, and serves on the board of directors of the Royersford Free Public Library and Royersford Community Chest.

== Political career ==
In 2010, Painter unsuccessfully ran for the Pennsylvania House of Representatives in the 146th District against the incumbent Tom Quigley, by a margin of 56%–44%. In 2012, Painter again challenged Quigley, this time winning the seat 50.4%–49.7%. Mark Painter was defeated in his re-election bid in 2014, losing to former state representative Tom Quigley by a margin of 52%–48%.

While serving as a state representative, Painter made property tax reform a priority. He was a co-sponsor of House Bill 76 to eliminate property taxes in Pennsylvania and replace them with increases in the income and sales taxes, and also voted in favor of that change. Painter had also introduced legislation to expand the property tax rebate program for seniors, including HB 2215 to allow families to deduct property taxes from their income for eligibility in the property tax rebate program, and HB 2214 to allow seniors to receive up to 15 percent of their paid property taxes back through the property tax rebate program.

He also supported increased state funding for education as a means to lower local property taxes. Painter introduced the Pennsylvania Pregnant Workers Fairness Act to prohibit workplace discrimination against pregnant women and women with newborn children and proposed two amendments that would add protections to the Landlord and Tenant Act for tenants who are victims of domestic violence. He also supported increased state funding for education and opposed heavily relying on local property taxes.

During his term as state representative, Painter served on the Agriculture & Rural Affairs, Human Services, Local Government, Commerce, and Policy committees.

== Other ventures ==
Since September 2015 Painter has been hosting and producing a podcast on the history of the twentieth century, taking an interdisciplinary approach that includes both politics but also culture, literature, religion and art.

== Personal life ==
Painter lives in Limerick Township with his wife Coleen. They have two biological children and two foster children from Southeast Asia.
