= Paul F. Crowley =

American politician (1934–2023)

Member of the Pennsylvania House of Representatives from the 112th district
- In office 1969–1972
- Preceded by: District created
- Succeeded by: Charles Volpe

Personal details
- Born: June 13, 1934 Scranton, Pennsylvania, U.S.
- Died: December 9, 2023 (aged 89) York, Pennsylvania, U.S.
- Party: Democratic
- Spouse: Mary Lou Crowley (Nealon)
- Children: Paul Crowley, Timothy Crowley, Mary Ellen Crowley
- Education: University of Scranton

Paul F. Crowley (June 13, 1934 – December 9, 2023) was an American politician who was a Democratic member of the Pennsylvania House of Representatives. Born in Scranton, Pennsylvania on June 13, 1934, Crowley died in York, Pennsylvania on December 9, 2023, at the age of 89.
