= Kevin Haggerty =

American politician

Member of the Pennsylvania House of Representatives from the 112th district
- In office December 1, 2016 – December 1, 2018
- Preceded by: Frank Farina
- Succeeded by: Kyle Mullins
- In office December 1, 2012 – December 1, 2014
- Preceded by: Ken Smith
- Succeeded by: Frank Farina

Personal details
- Born: October 27, 1972 (age 53) Dunmore, Pennsylvania
- Party: Democratic
- Spouse: Jennifer (Divorced)
- Children: Kevin
- Education: Villanova University
- Occupation: legislator
- Website: pahouse.com/Haggerty

Kevin Haggerty (born October 27, 1972) was a Pennsylvania State Representative from the 112th District. He defeated three term Rep. Ken Smith in the 2012 primary to secure the Democratic nomination in 2012. He served on the Children & Youth, Game & Fisheries, Human Services, and Veterans Affairs Committees.

He was defeated in the 2014 Primary Election by fellow Democratic incumbent Representative Frank Farina after Farina's 115th District was folded into the 112th District. He defeated Farina in a rematch in the 2016 election.

Rep. Kevin Haggerty cited his status as a veteran during his election process. His official records available through a FOIA request were made available online by veteran watchdog groups like thisainthell.us Rep. Haggerty was declared a deserter according to his records and discharged early from his military obligations as a private. According to his official records he only served on active duty for approximately 9 months and spent much of that time as a deserter. Recently he has been accused of hitting his wife Jennifer. Jennifer took a PFA out against him but she ended up dropping the charges. Haggerty did not seek reelection in 2018 and was succeeded by Kyle Mullins, former legislative director for State Senator John Blake. In 2021 he was convicted of 3 felonies related to forgery, credit card theft and fraud of his mothers caregiver. https://www.timesleader.com/news/938974/former-state-rep-haggerty-charged-with-fraudulent-use-of-credit-card
