= Robert Reber =

American politician

Robert D. Reber Jr.

Member of the Pennsylvania House of Representatives from the 146th district
- In office 1981–1999
- Preceded by: William H. Yohn Jr.
- Succeeded by: Mary Ann Dailey

Personal details
- Born: July 19, 1947 (age 79)
- Party: Republican

Robert D. Reber Jr. (born July 19, 1947) is a former Republican member of the Pennsylvania House of Representatives.
