= Cris Dush =

American politician (born 1961)

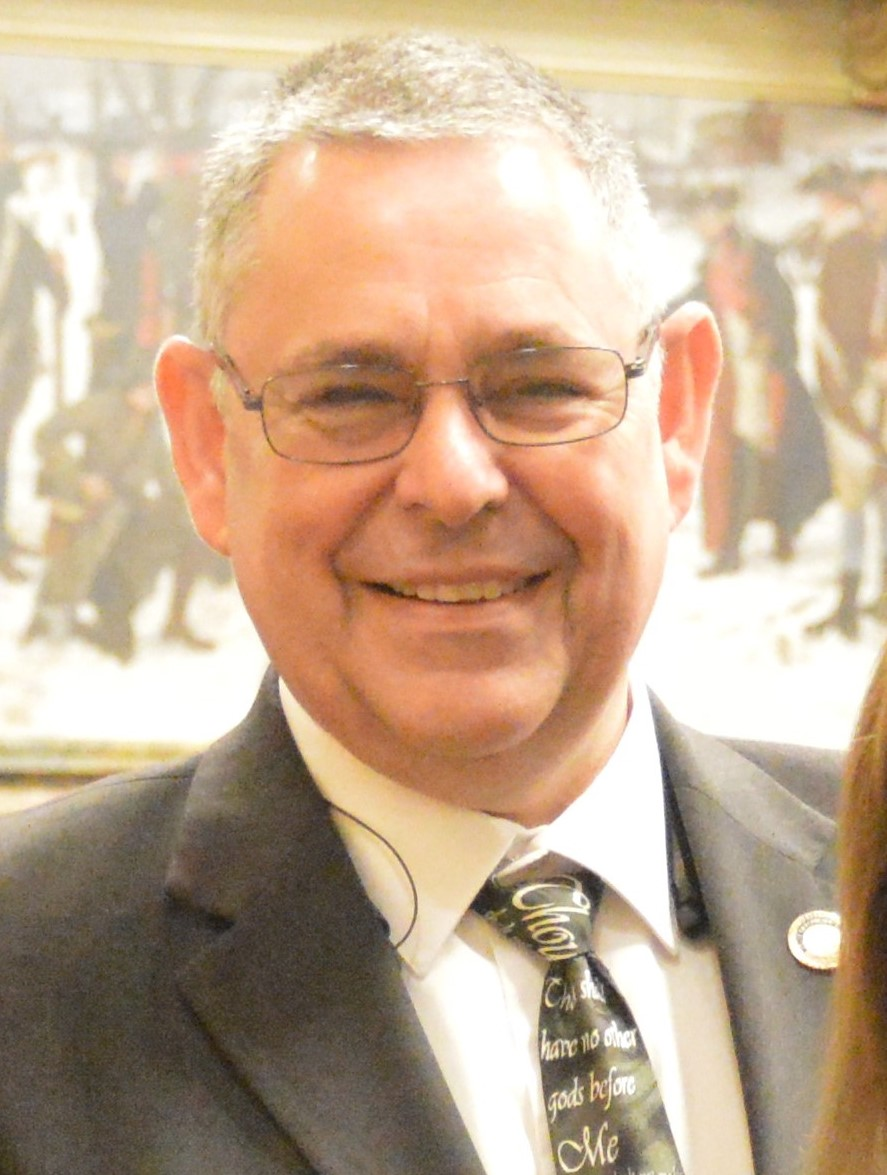

Member of the Pennsylvania Senate from the 25th district
- Incumbent
- Assumed office January 5, 2021
- Preceded by: Joe Scarnati

Member of the Pennsylvania House of Representatives from the 66th district
- In office December 1, 2014 – November 30, 2020
- Preceded by: Sam Smith
- Succeeded by: Brian Smith

Personal details
- Born: March 1, 1961 (age 65) DuBois, Pennsylvania, U.S.
- Party: Republican
- Spouse: Traci

Military service
- Branch/service: United States Air Force; Pennsylvania Air National Guard
- Years of service: 1982–1990 (USAF); 2000–2016 (PA ANG)
- Campaigns: Operation Iraqi Freedom; Operation Noble Eagle

Cris E. Dush (born March 1, 1961) is an American politician. A Republican, he has been a member of the Pennsylvania State Senate since 2020, elected from the 25th District. From 2014 to 2020, Dush was a member of the Pennsylvania House of Representatives, elected from the 66th District, which then encompassed Jefferson County and Indiana County.

== Early life and career before politics ==
Dush was born on March 1, 1961 in DuBois, Pennsylvania. He graduated from Brookville Area High School in 1979. He was a member of the U.S. Air Force from 1982 to 1990 and a member of the Pennsylvania Air National Guard from 2000 to 2016. From 1995 until his retirement in January 2012, Dush was employed by the Pennsylvania Department of Corrections as a prison corrections officer.

== Political career ==
=== Pennsylvania House of Representatives ===
Dush was elected to the Pennsylvania House of Representatives in 2014, representing the 66th district. In March 2018, Dush introduced resolutions, co-sponsored by 12 other Republicans state legislators, to impeach four Pennsylvania Supreme Court justices in response to the court's decision in League of Women Voters v. Commonwealth that struck down a Republican-drawn Pennsylvania congressional district map as a partisan gerrymander that violated the state constitution's requirement of "free and equal" elections. Dush made this proposal after the U.S. Supreme Court rejected a request from Republican legislative leaders in Pennsylvania to block the redrawn congressional map. Dush asserted that the justices' decision constituted "misbehavior in office" and was a judicial infringement on legislative power. The attempt to impeach the justices was denounced by Chief Justice Thomas Saylor, and failed after House Republican Leader David L. Reed decided not to support it.

=== Pennsylvania State Senate ===
In November 2019, Dush announced he would not seek a fourth term in the Pennsylvania House of Representatives, noting a promise he made to only serve three terms when he was first elected in 2014. In January 2020, Dush said he would seek the Republican nomination for Pennsylvania Auditor General, joining a race against two other Republicans seeking the nomination. The next month, however, Dush left that race and announced that he would run for the state Senate instead, for the 25th district seat left open by the retirement of Joe Scarnati. Dush won the race for the seat against Democrat Margie Brown.

In September 2021, Dush chaired a Republican-led committee that approved subpoenas for a wide range of data and personal information on voters.

In 2022, he sponsored legislation to prohibit ballot drop boxes in Pennsylvania elections.

Dush was appointed to chair of the Senate State Government Committee in 2023 by President pro tempore Kim Ward. In that role Dush approved of measures to require voter ID, allow for post-election audits, and require more security for ballot drop boxes. Dush has also supported stripping mentally incompetent individuals of their right to vote. He also opposed the implementation of automatic voter registration.

For the 2025-2026 Session Dush serves on the following committees in the State Senate:

- State Government (Chair)
- Intergovernmental Operations (Vice Chair)
- Appropriations
- Game & Fisheries
- Judiciary
- Local Government
- Veterans Affairs & Emergency Preparedness

== Political positions ==
=== Marijuana ===
Dush opposed proposals by Democratic Lieutenant Governor John Fetterman to legalize the adult use of marijuana in Pennsylvania.

=== COVID-19 ===
In 2020, Dush compared Governor Tom Wolf's handling of the COVID-19 pandemic in Pennsylvania to Nazi Germany. A group of Jewish organizations, including the Philadelphia branch of the Anti-Defamation League and the Jewish Federation of Greater Pittsburgh, condemned Dush's Nazi analogy as "offensive and wrong".

=== 2020 election and continuing denial ===
After the 2020 U.S. presidential election, Dush was one of 26 Pennsylvania House Republicans who called for withdrawing certification of presidential electors, despite Joe Biden winning Pennsylvania by over 80,000 votes with no evidence of fraud. This was also after federal appeals brought by the Trump campaign were dismissed due to lack of evidence. Afterward, Dush traveled to Arizona along with fellow senator Doug Mastriano, and state house member Rob Kauffman, to observe its 2021 Maricopa County presidential ballot audit, which the Maricopa County Board of Supervisors called a "spectacle". The audit was ordered by Arizona's Republican senate majority, the rationale for which was generated by widely discredited conspiracy theories. One firm involved had previously audited the 2020 election in Pennsylvania. The United States Department of Justice warned the audit participants that they may have broken the law in compromising the integrity of those Maricopa County, Arizona ballots. Dush supported the gubernatorial candidacy of Mastriano in 2022, when he also claimed an undefined "they" would steal that election again. He has rejected labeling the January 6 United States Capitol attack as an insurrection.

== Electoral history ==
2012 Pennsylvania House of Representatives Republican primary election, District 66
Party	Candidate	Votes	%
Republican	Sam Smith (incumbent)	3,083	48.73
Republican	Cris Dush	2,674	42.26
Republican	James Mark Brown	570	9.01
Total votes		6,327	100.00

2014 Pennsylvania House of Representatives Republican primary election, District 66
Party	Candidate	Votes	%
Republican	Cris Dush	3,294	50.53
Republican	Paul L. Corbin	3,006	46.11
Republican	Harry Glenn Bodenhorn	219	3.36
Total votes		6,519	100.00

2014 Pennsylvania House of Representatives election, District 66
Party	Candidate	Votes	%
Republican	Cris Dush	11,777	72.06
Democratic	Robert Toby Santik	4,597	27.94
Total votes		16,344	100.00

2016 Pennsylvania House of Representatives election, District 66
Party	Candidate	Votes	%
Republican	Cris Dush (incumbent)	Unopposed	
Total votes		23,951	100.00

2018 Pennsylvania House of Representatives election, District 66
Party	Candidate	Votes	%
Republican	Cris Dush	17,007	79.56
Democratic	Kerith Strano Taylor	4,369	20.44
Total votes		21,376	100.00

2020 Pennsylvania Senate Republican primary election, District 25
Party	Candidate	Votes	%
Republican	Cris Dush	23,087	59.02
Republican	John Herm Suplizio	12,232	31.27
Republican	Jim Brown	3,799	9.71
Total votes		39,118	100.00

2020 Pennsylvania Senate election, District 25
Party	Candidate	Votes	%
Republican	Cris Dush	88,994	74.41
Democratic	Margaret Satterwhite Brown	30,608	25.59
Total votes		119,602	100.00

Political offices
Pennsylvania State Senate
Preceded by Joe Scarnati	Member of the Pennsylvania Senate from the 25th District; 2021-Present	Incumbent
Pennsylvania House of Representatives
Preceded by Samuel H. Smith	Member of the Pennsylvania House of Representatives from the 66th District; 2015-2020	Succeeded by Brian Smith
