= William McLane (Pennsylvania politician) =

American politician

William J. McLane

Member of the Pennsylvania House of Representatives from the 112th district
- In office 1975–1978
- Preceded by: Charles Volpe
- Succeeded by: Fred Belardi

Personal details
- Born: March 5, 1947 Scranton, Pennsylvania
- Died: February 22, 2010 (aged 62) Olyphant, Pennsylvania
- Party: Democratic

William J. McLane (March 5, 1947 – February 22, 2010) was a Democratic member of the Pennsylvania House of Representatives.
