= Charles Volpe =

American politician

Charles J. Volpe

Member of the Pennsylvania House of Representatives from the 112th district
- In office 1973–1974
- Preceded by: Paul F. Crowley
- Succeeded by: William McLane

Personal details
- Born: November 29, 1936
- Died: September 22, 1988 (aged 51)
- Party: Republican

Charles J. Volpe (November 29, 1936 – September 22, 1988) was a Republican member of the Pennsylvania House of Representatives.
