= Maureen Madden =

American politician

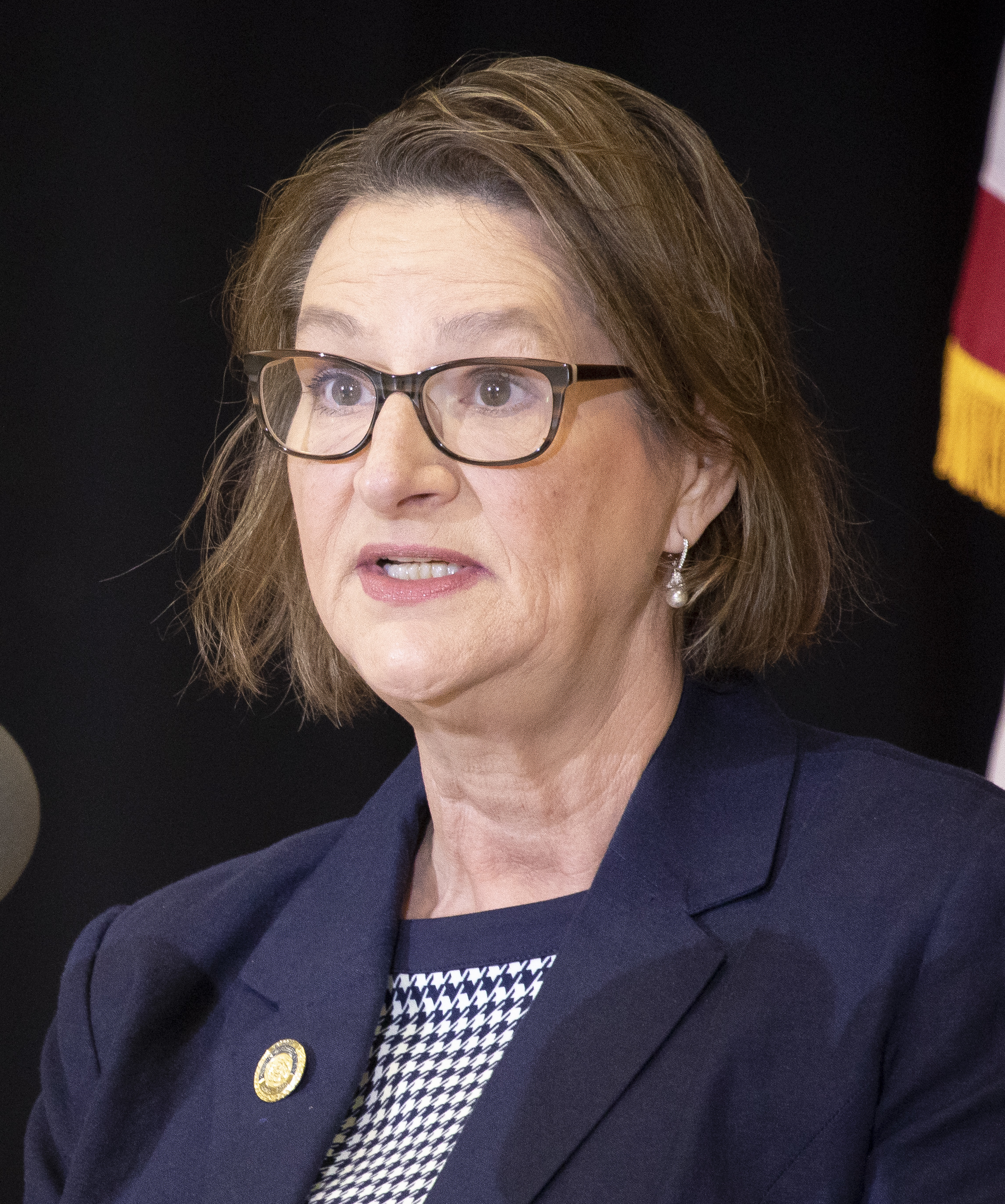
- Madden in 2020

Member of the Pennsylvania House of Representatives from the 115th district
- Incumbent
- Assumed office January 3, 2017
- Preceded by: David Parker

Personal details
- Party: Democratic
- Website: maureenmadden.com

Maureen Madden is a Democratic member of the Pennsylvania House of Representatives, serving since 2017.

Madden currently sits on the Education, Gaming Oversight, Human Services, and State Government committees.

== Education ==
Madden has a bachelor's degree in political science from Marymount Manhattan College and a master's degree in communication from Marywood University.

== Electoral history ==
2016 Pennsylvania State Representative election for the 115th district
Party	Candidate	Votes	%	±%
Democratic	Maureen Madden	11,845	51.92	+4.54
Republican	David Parker (incumbent)	10,969	48.08	−4.54
Total votes		22,814	100.0%	N/A
Democratic gain from Republican				

2018 Pennsylvania State Representative election for the 115th district
Party	Candidate	Votes	%	±%
Democratic	Maureen Madden (incumbent)	11,316	60.11	+8.19
Republican	David Parker	7,511	39.89	−8.19
Total votes		18,827	100.0%	N/A
Democratic hold				

2020 Pennsylvania State Representative election for the 115th district
Party	Candidate	Votes	%	±%
Democratic	Maureen Madden (incumbent)	17,605	63.92	+3.81
Republican	Dulce Ridder	9,939	36.08	−3.81
Total votes		27,544	100.0%	N/A
Democratic hold				
