= Timothy Twardzik =

American politician

Member of the Pennsylvania House of Representatives from the 123rd district
- Incumbent
- Assumed office January 5, 2021
- Preceded by: Neal Goodman

Personal details
- Born: Shenandoah, Pennsylvania, United States
- Party: Republican
- Education: University of Notre Dame
- Website: Official website

Timothy "Tim" Twardzik is an American businessman and politician. A Republican member of the Pennsylvania House of Representatives, he has represented the 123rd district in Schuylkill County since 2021.

Twardzik is the first Republican to represent the 123rd Legislative District in more than fifty years.

== Formative years and family ==
Twardzik graduated from Shenandoah Valley High School in 1977 and from the University of Notre Dame in 1981. He began working for his family's business immediately after graduating from college.

He is the son of Ted Twardzik, founder of Mrs. T's Pierogies. He is married to Caroline Kiefer Twardzik. He is the father of three sons.

== Career ==
Prior to public service, Twardzik served as an executive vice president at Ateeco Inc., the marketer of Mrs. T's.

In 2020, Twardzik was elected to the Pennsylvania House of Representatives representing the 123rd district, which contains parts of Schuylkill County. He defeated Democratic candidate Peter Symons with 62.6% of the vote in the general election.

In 2022, Twardzik was opposed by Democratic candidate Kathy Benyak. Twardzik won with nearly 70% of the vote.

In 2024, Twardzik was opposed by Democratic candidate Michael Zvalaren. Twardzik won with over 73% of the vote.

In 2026, Twardzik was opposed by Democratic candidate John Deatrich. Twardzik won with 62% of the vote.
