= Joe Ciresi =

American politician (b. 1970)

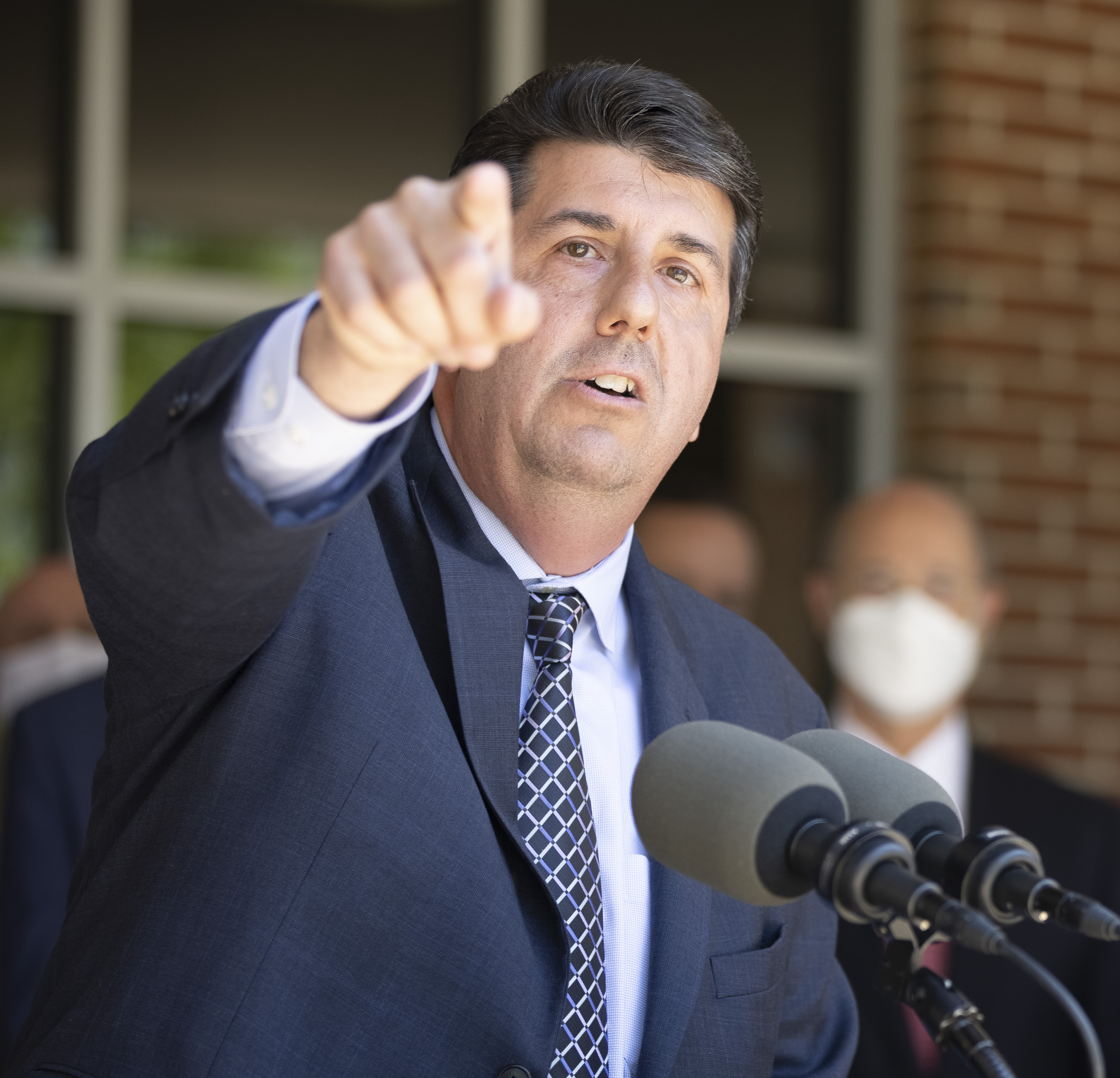
- Ciresi in January 2021

Member of the Pennsylvania House of Representatives from the 146th district
- Incumbent
- Assumed office January 1, 2019
- Preceded by: Tom Quigley

Member of the Spring-Ford School Board from the 3rd Region
- In office December 3, 2003 – November 27, 2017

Personal details
- Born: September 15, 1970 (age 55) East Northport, New York, U.S.
- Party: Democratic
- Spouse: Pam (m. 1994)
- Children: 1
- Education: University of Miami
- Occupation: Advertising Sales Director, Kimmel Center for the Performing Arts
- Website: Official Website; Campaign Website

Joseph Ciresi (born September 15, 1970) is an American politician and Democratic member of the Pennsylvania House of Representatives, representing the 146th district. Located in Montgomery County, the district includes all of Limerick Township, Lower Pottsgrove Township, Perkiomen Township, Royersford, Trappe, and parts of Pottstown.

== Political career ==
=== Spring-Ford Area School District ===
Ciresi was first elected to the Spring-Ford Area School District School Board in 2003, representing the 3rd region. He served on the board until 2017.

=== Pennsylvania House of Representatives ===
==== 2016 election ====
In 2016, Ciresi launched his campaign for the Pennsylvania House of Representatives to represent the 146th District, challenging Republican incumbent Tom Quigley. He was one of 10 candidates for the PA House to be endorsed by President Barack Obama. Ciresi was defeated in the general election by Quigley by nearly 600 votes, in one of the tightest margins for a state house race.

==== 2018 election ====
In 2017, Ciresi announced he would challenge Quigley to a rematch for the 146th district. Both candidates were unopposed in their respective primaries.

Receiving the endorsement of Barack Obama once again, Ciresi defeated Quigley in the general election, reversing his fortunes from 2016.

==== 2020 election ====
In January 2020, Ciresi launched his re-election campaign. He was unopposed in the primary and faced Republican Tom Neafcy, a Limerick Township supervisor. Ciresi defeated Neafcy in the general election, winning nearly 57% of the vote.

==== Results ====
Pennsylvania House of Representatives, District 146, 2016
Party	Candidate	Votes	%
Republican	Tom Quigley (incumbent)	15,060	51.13%
Democratic	Joe Ciresi	14,381	48.82%
Write-in		15	0.05%
Total votes		29,456	100.00%
Republican hold			

Pennsylvania House of Representatives, District 146, 2018
Party	Candidate	Votes	%
Democratic	Joe Ciresi	14,093	55.51%
Republican	Tom Quigley (incumbent)	11,286	44.46%
Write-in		7	0.03%
Total votes		25,386	100.00%
Democratic gain from Republican			

Pennsylvania House of Representatives, District 146, 2020
Party	Candidate	Votes	%
Democratic	Joe Ciresi (incumbent)	20,681	56.74%
Republican	Tom Neafcy	15,706	43.09%
Write-in		61	0.17%
Total votes		36,448	100.00%
Democratic hold			

Pennsylvania House of Representatives, District 146, 2022
Party	Candidate	Votes	%
Democratic	Joe Ciresi (incumbent)	16,091	61.74%
Republican	Tom Neafcy	9,935	38.12%
Write-in		37	0.14%
Total votes		26,063	100.00%
Democratic hold			

=== Tenure ===
Ciresi was sworn in on January 1, 2019.

==== Committee assignments ====
- Communications & Technology, Chair

Pennsylvania House of Representatives
Preceded by Tom Quigley	Member of the Pennsylvania House of Representatives from the 146th district 2019–present	Incumbent
