= Mary Ann Dailey =

American politician (born 1948)

Mary Ann R. Dailey

Member of the Pennsylvania House of Representatives from the 146th district
- In office January 5, 1999 – November 30, 2004
- Preceded by: Robert D. Reber, Jr.
- Succeeded by: Tom Quigley

Personal details
- Born: July 1, 1948 (age 78) Monessen, Pennsylvania
- Party: Republican
- Spouse: Jacob
- Education: Widener University
- Occupation: Legislator/College Professor of Nursing

Mary Ann R. Dailey (born July 1, 1948) is a former Republican member of the Pennsylvania House of Representatives.

She attended Monessen High School and the Presbyterian University Hospital School of Nursing. She earned a B.S.N. from University of State of New York, a M.S.N. and Ph.D. from Widener University.

She was first elected to represent the 146th legislative district in the Pennsylvania House of Representatives in 1998, a position she held until her retirement prior to the 2004 election. From 2007 - 2013, she served as chair of the Nursing Department at Kutztown University of Pennsylvania. Currently, she is an associate professor of nursing at Slippery Rock University, Slippery Rock, PA.
