= League of Women Voters of Pennsylvania v. Commonwealth of Pennsylvania =

2018 Pennsylvania Supreme Court case regarding gerrymandering

- Court: Supreme Court of Pennsylvania
- Full case name: League of Women Voters, et al. v. the Commonwealth of Pennsylvania, et al.
- Decided: January 22, 2018

Case history
- Appealed from: Commonwealth Court of Pennsylvania
- Subsequent action: Opinion and Order Adopting Remedial Plan

Court membership
- Judges sitting: Thomas G. Saylor, Max Baer, Debra Todd, Christine Donohue, Kevin Dougherty, David Wecht, Sallie Mundy

Case opinions
- The Congressional Redistricting Act of 2011 was deemed an unconstitutional gerrymander, and the Pennsylvania congressional maps were ordered redrawn.
- Majority: Todd, joined by Donohue, Dougherty, Wecht
- Concur/dissent: Baer
- Dissent: Saylor, joined by Mundy
- Dissent: Mundy

League of Women Voters of Pennsylvania et al. v. Commonwealth of Pennsylvania et al.—abbreviated League of Women Voters v. Commonwealth—was a decision of the Pennsylvania Supreme Court on gerrymandering, concerning the power of the Pennsylvania General Assembly to draw maps based on partisan advantage. The Court ruled that the maps adopted by the Republican controlled legislature in 2011 was an unconstitutional partisan gerrymander under the Constitution of Pennsylvania.

== Background ==
In the 2010 Pennsylvania elections, Republicans won a landslide victory, with Tom Corbett winning the 2010 Pennsylvania gubernatorial election, recapturing the Pennsylvania House of Representatives, and regained their majority in the Pennsylvania delegation to the U.S. House of Representatives, winning 12 seats to the Democrat's 7 seats. Following the 2010 census, Pennsylvania Republicans would have full state control of the redistricting process for the second decade in a row.

On September 14, 2011, Republican leadership in the Pennsylvania State Senate introduced a congressional redistricting bill which contained neither a map nor description of proposed congressional district lines. The proposed lines were added in the Senate State Government Committee on December 13, 2011. The committee approved the bill 6-5 along party lines. Breaking with his party, Republican Sen. Mike Folmer opposed the Republican bill, saying "all you have to do is look at (the map)" to see it appeared to be specifically drawn to dilute Democratic votes and was the perfect example of why redistricting reform is needed. Barry Kauffman, lobbyist for Common Cause of Pennsylvania, agreed with Folmer, saying the plan "is a clear-cut case of politicians picking their voters in order to prevent voters from having a meaningful opportunity to pick their elected officials."

On December 14, 2011, the bill returned to the Senate, which passed it the following day. Prior to senate passage, senate Democrats proposed an amendment to use a different map. Advocating for the change, Democratic Senator Vincent Hughes argued that under both plans, the Democrats could only count on four districts, but the Republicans would go from 12 safe districts to eight. In the Republican plan two districts would be "swing" districts, but the Democrats' plan would have six. This amendment was defeated on a party line vote. The Senate voted to approve the new map by a 26–24 vote on December 14, 2011. The map then went to the House, who approved it 136–61 on December 20, 2011. The House vote was less partisan, with 36 Democrats voting for the redistricting map and 8 Republicans voting against it. Democrats introduced their own map as an amendment, but the amendment failed. Pennsylvania Democratic Chairman Jim Burn issued a press release, stating, "The Republicans have proposed a map far more partisan and gerrymandered than anyone would have guessed, a map that they will now force into law without any public input."

Corbett signed the new map into law on December 22, 2011.

The map drew Democratic Reps. Jason Altmire and Mark Critz into the same district while putting six Republicans into safer districts.

== History ==
On June 14, 2017, the League of Women Voters of Pennsylvania filed a lawsuit, alleging that the existing congressional district lines were unconstitutionally gerrymandered to favor the Republican Party. On December 29, 2017, a Pennsylvania trial court held that, although the district boundaries had been drawn to favor Republicans, the district lines did not violate state law. The case was appealed to the Pennsylvania Supreme Court, which reviewed the matter on an expedited basis.

In a short order on January 22, 2018, the Pennsylvania Supreme Court struck down the existing map, saying it "clearly, plainly and palpably" violated the state constitution. The court promised a full opinion at a later date, and provided a timeframe in which the state legislative and executive branches could prepare new maps if they chose to do so.

== Remedial actions ==
The Court's order gave the General Assembly until February 9, 2018, to submit a proposed map to the governor, who would have until February 15, 2018, to submit it to the court. After the deadline for the General Assembly to submit a new plan to the governor expired without an agreement, the Pennsylvania Supreme Court released a new congressional map on February 19, 2018, to take effect for the May 15 primaries.

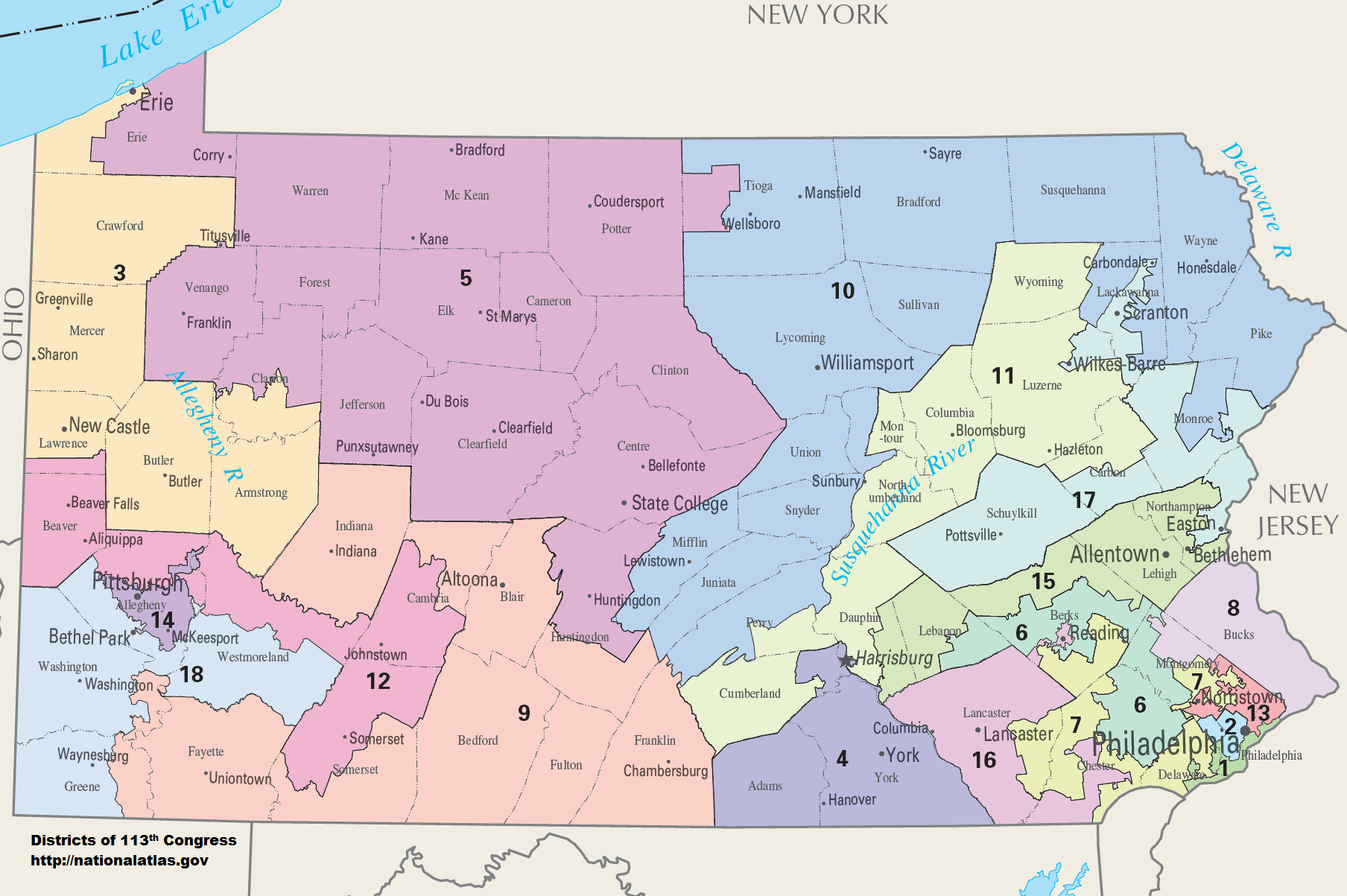
Congressional district map (2013–2018)

Court-mandated districts for 2018 elections.

== Subsequent developments ==
Pennsylvania Republicans appealed to the United States Supreme Court and tried to halt enforcement of the January 22 order while the appeal was pending. Their request was denied on February 5, 2018.

Republican lawmakers in the state applied to the United States Supreme Court for a stay of the Pennsylvania Supreme Court's decision; however that application was denied on March 19, 2018. Pennsylvania had also brought suit in federal district court, seeking an injunction against using the court-drawn map in the upcoming congressional elections. On March 19, 2018, the federal district court ruled against the Republican lawmakers in that case.

In March 2018, then-State Representative Cris Dush introduced resolutions, co-sponsored by 12 other Republicans state legislators, to impeach the four justices in the majority opinion. Dush asserted that the justices' decision constituted "misbehavior in office" and was a judicial infringement on legislative power. The attempt to impeach the justices was denounced by Chief Justice Thomas Saylor, and failed after House Republican Leader David L. Reed decided not to support it.
