= L. Eugene Smith =

American politician (1921–2019)

Member of the Pennsylvania House of Representatives from the 66th district
- In office January 7, 1969 – November 30, 1986
- Preceded by: District Created
- Succeeded by: Sam Smith

Member of the Pennsylvania House of Representatives from the Jefferson County district
- In office January 3, 1963 – November 30, 1968

Personal details
- Born: September 3, 1921 Punxsutawney, Pennsylvania
- Died: April 7, 2019 (aged 97) DeLancey, Jefferson County, Pennsylvania
- Party: Republican

L. Eugene Smith (September 3, 1921 – April 7, 2019) was a Republican member of the Pennsylvania House of Representatives.
