= Tom Quigley =

American politician (born 1963)

Member of the Pennsylvania House of Representatives from the 146th district
- In office January 6, 2015 – November 30, 2018
- Preceded by: Mark Painter
- Succeeded by: Joe Ciresi
- In office January 4, 2005 – November 30, 2013
- Preceded by: Mary Ann Dailey
- Succeeded by: Mark Painter

Personal details
- Born: April 18, 1963 (age 63) Philadelphia, Pennsylvania, U.S.
- Party: Republican
- Education: Philadelphia University
- Occupation: Former Mayor, Borough Councilman, project leader

Thomas J. Quigley (born April 18, 1963) is an American politician from Pennsylvania. He represented the 146th Legislative District in Pennsylvania House of Representatives for four terms.

== Career ==
Quigley was elected mayor of Royersford in 2001. He was a Royersford Borough Councilman from 1999 to 2001. Shortly before his tenure as a state representative, Quigley worked as a project leader for an investment firm.

=== Pennsylvania House of Representatives ===
Quigley was elected to the Pennsylvania House of Representatives to represent the 146th district in 2004. He served on the House Education, Finance and Liquor Control Committees. Quigley lost the seat to Democratic opponent Mark Painter in 2012. Quigley would return to the House when he defeated Painter at the November 4, 2014 election and seated on December 1, 2014. Quigley was defeated for reelection by Democratic opponent Joe Ciresi in 2018.

== Personal life ==
Quigley earned his bachelor's degree in business management from Philadelphia University in 1986 and his Master of Business Administration from Philadelphia University in 1993.

He resides in Royersford.
