= Brian Smith (Pennsylvania politician) =

American politician from Pennsylvania

Member of the Pennsylvania House of Representatives from the 66th district
- Incumbent
- Assumed office January 5, 2021
- Preceded by: Cris Dush

Personal details
- Party: Republican
- Spouse: Linda
- Children: 3
- Website: Official website

Brian Smith is an American politician serving as a Republican member of the Pennsylvania House of Representatives for the 66th district since 2021.

== Biography ==
Smith graduated from Marion Center Area High School in 1987 and attended Penn State University from 1987 to 1989. In 2014, he was elected to the Punxsutawney Borough Council, becoming council president in 2016.

In 2020, Smith was elected to the Pennsylvania House of Representatives representing the 66th district, which includes parts of Jefferson County and Indiana County. He did not have an opponent in the November general election. Smith currently sits on the Children & Youth, Liquor Control, Tourism & Recreational Development, and Urban Affairs committees.

He has three children with his wife Linda.
