= David Parker (Pennsylvania politician) =

American politician

Member of the Pennsylvania House of Representatives from the 115th district
- In office January 6, 2015 – November 30, 2016
- Preceded by: Frank Farina
- Succeeded by: Maureen Madden

Personal details
- Party: Republican
- Spouse: Amanda
- Children: 5
- Education: Messiah College
- Occupation: Business Owner

David Parker was a member of the Pennsylvania House of Representatives, representing the 115th House district in Monroe County, Pennsylvania.
