= Pennsylvania House of Representatives, District 66 =

American legislative district

Pennsylvania's 66th State House of Representatives district
Representative
Brian Smith; R–Punxsutawney
- Population (2022): 62,378

The 66th Pennsylvania House of Representatives District is located in west central Pennsylvania and has been represented by Brian Smith since 2021.

== District profile ==
The 66th District encompasses all of Jefferson County, and includes the following areas of Indiana County:

- Banks Township
- Canoe Township
- Cherry Tree
- East Mahoning Township
- Ernest
- Glen Campbell
- Grant Township
- Green Township
- Marion Center
- Montgomery Township
- North Mahoning Township
- Plumville
- Rayne Township
- Smicksburg
- South Mahoning Township
- West Mahoning Township

== Representative ==
Representative	Party	Years	District home	Note
Prior to 1969, seats were apportioned by county.
L. Eugene Smith	Republican	1969 – 1986	Punxsutawney	Retired
Samuel H. Smith	Republican	1987 – 2014	Punxsutawney	Retired
Cris Dush	Republican	2015 - 2021	Pine Creek Township	
Brian Smith	Republican	2021–present	Punxsutawney	Incumbent

== Recent election results ==
PA House election, 2024: Pennsylvania House, District 66
Party	Candidate	Votes	%
Republican	Brian Smith (incumbent)	Unopposed	
Total votes		28,232	100.00
Republican hold			

PA House election, 2022: Pennsylvania House, District 66
Party	Candidate	Votes	%
Republican	Brian Smith (incumbent)	Unopposed	
Total votes		21,506	100.00
Republican hold			

PA House election, 2020: Pennsylvania House, District 66
Party	Candidate	Votes	%
Republican	Brian Smith	Unopposed	
Total votes		28,093	100.00
Republican hold			

PA House election, 2018: Pennsylvania House, District 66
Party	Candidate	Votes	%
Republican	Cris Dush (incumbent)	17,007	79.56
Democratic	Kerith Strano Taylor	4,369	20.44
Total votes		21,376	100.00
Republican hold			

PA House election, 2016: Pennsylvania House, District 66
Party	Candidate	Votes	%
Republican	Cris Dush (incumbent)	Unopposed	
Total votes		23,951	100.00
Republican hold			
