= Cleveland Smith =

American politician

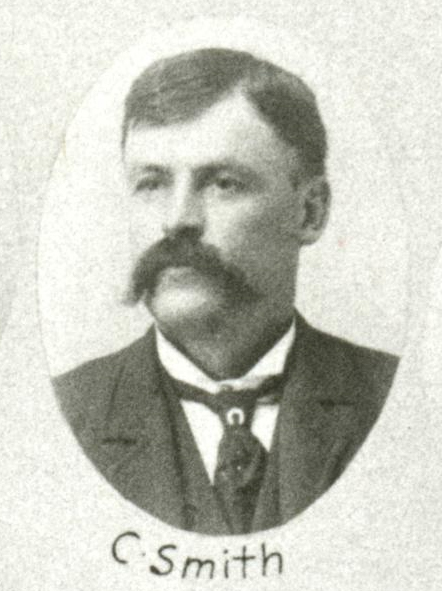
- Smith in 1895

Member of the Washington House of Representatives for the 6th district
- In office 1895–1899

Personal details
- Born: September 1853 Delaware County, New York, United States
- Died: January 12, 1935 (aged 81) Modesto, California, United States
- Party: Populist

Cleveland Smith (September 1853 – January 12, 1935) was an American politician in the state of Washington. He served in the Washington House of Representatives from 1895 to 1899.
