= Kenneth J. Smith =

American politician

Member of the Pennsylvania House of Representatives from the 112th district
- In office January 2, 2007 – January 2, 2013
- Preceded by: Fred Belardi
- Succeeded by: Kevin Haggerty

Personal details
- Born: 1961 (age 64–65) Scranton, Pennsylvania
- Party: Democratic
- Spouse: Dorothy Trionfo
- Children: 2
- Education: Keystone College

Kenneth J. "Ken" Smith (born 1961) is a former Democratic member of the Pennsylvania House of Representatives for the 112th legislative district. He was elected in 2006.

== Biography ==
Smith attended Dunmore High School and Keystone College.

Prior to elective office, he owned Smith's Restaurant in Scranton, which has been a family-owned business since 1934. Smith defeated incumbent Fred Belardi in the 2006 democratic primary. and easily won the general election.

It was disclosed in 2008 that the restaurant property was subject to over $27,274 in delinquent school and city property taxes. The restaurant was put up for tax sale in 2007, but received no bids. Smith paid off the tax liens on his property by May 2008. In November 2009, the Pennsylvania Department of Revenue filed a $24,762 tax lien against the restaurant, an action that Smith said was a "mistake," citing the fact that he had paid the tax bill two months prior.
