= Frank Farina (politician) =

American politician

Member of the Pennsylvania House of Representatives from the 112th district
- In office January 6, 2015 – January 6, 2017
- Preceded by: Kevin Haggerty
- Succeeded by: Kevin Haggerty

Member of the Pennsylvania House of Representatives from the 115th district
- In office January 2, 2013 – January 6, 2015
- Preceded by: Edward Staback
- Succeeded by: David Parker

Personal details
- Born: June 11, 1976 (age 50)
- Party: Democratic
- Spouse: Karla
- Children: Antonio, Rocco and Alexa
- Education: Penn State University
- Website: Official Website

Frank Farina (born June 11, 1976) was a Democratic member of the Pennsylvania House of Representatives, representing the 115th District from 2013 to 2014 and the 112th District from 2015 to 2016.

Farina was first elected in 2012, and was sworn in on January 2, 2013. He defeated former Lackawanna County commissioner Randy Castellani by 110 votes in the Democratic primary to secure the party's nomination. He defeated Republican Theresa Kane in the general election.

Farina served on the Environmental Resources & Energy Committee, the Game & Fisheries Committee, and the Tourism & Recreational Development Committee.

After Pennsylvania's 115th House District was moved from Lackawanna and Wayne Counties to Monroe County during redistricting, Farina ran for the 112th District, then represented by Kevin Haggerty. Farina defeated Haggerty in the 2014 Democratic primary and went on to win the general election. Haggerty and Farina faced each other again in the 2016 Democratic primary, with Haggerty ultimately winning the rematch by 329 votes.
