= Neal Goodman =

American politician

Neal P. Goodman

Member of the Pennsylvania House of Representatives from the 123rd district
- In office January 7, 2003 – December 1, 2020
- Preceded by: Edward Lucyk
- Succeeded by: Timothy Twardzik

Personal details
- Born: October 20, 1957 (age 68) Bethlehem, Pennsylvania
- Party: Democratic

Neal P. Goodman (born October 20, 1957) is a former Democratic member of the Pennsylvania House of Representatives.

== Early life ==
Born in Bethlehem, Northampton County, Pennsylvania on October 20, 1957, Goodman graduated from Mahanoy Area High School in 1976, and attended Pennsylvania State University's Schuylkill Haven campus from 1979 to 1981 before earning his Bachelor of Arts in history from East Stroudsburg University in 1986.

== Military career ==
From 1982 to 1988, he served as a sergeant in the United States Marine Corps Reserves.

== Political career ==
In 1988, he was elected to the Mahanoy City Council, serving as its president from 1995 to 1996 and ending his term in 1996.

From 1993 to 2002, he also served as the chief of staff to Representative Edward J. Lucyk. After serving as executive director of the Veterans Affairs and Emergency Preparedness Committee, Democratic Caucus, Pennsylvania House of Representatives from 1993 to 1995, he then served as the executive director of the Tourism and Recreational Development Committee, Democratic Caucus, Pennsylvania House of Representatives from 1995 to 2002 and as director of the Schuylkill County Visitors Bureau from 1999 to 2003).

A Democrat, he was elected to the Pennsylvania House of Representatives for the 2003 term and, as of 2019, was serving his ninth consecutive term. During his tenure with the Pennsylvania House, he has served as the Minority Caucus Administrator (2013 to 2020) and as a member of the Capitol Preservation Committee (2013 to 2014).

In November 2019, Goodman announced that he will not seek re-election in 2020.

On November 3, 2020, Republican Tim Twardzik of Butler Township, won Goodman’s seat after defeating Democrat Peter “PJ” Symons of St. Clair.
