= Pennsylvania House of Representatives, District 112 =

American legislative district

Pennsylvania's 112th State House of Representatives district
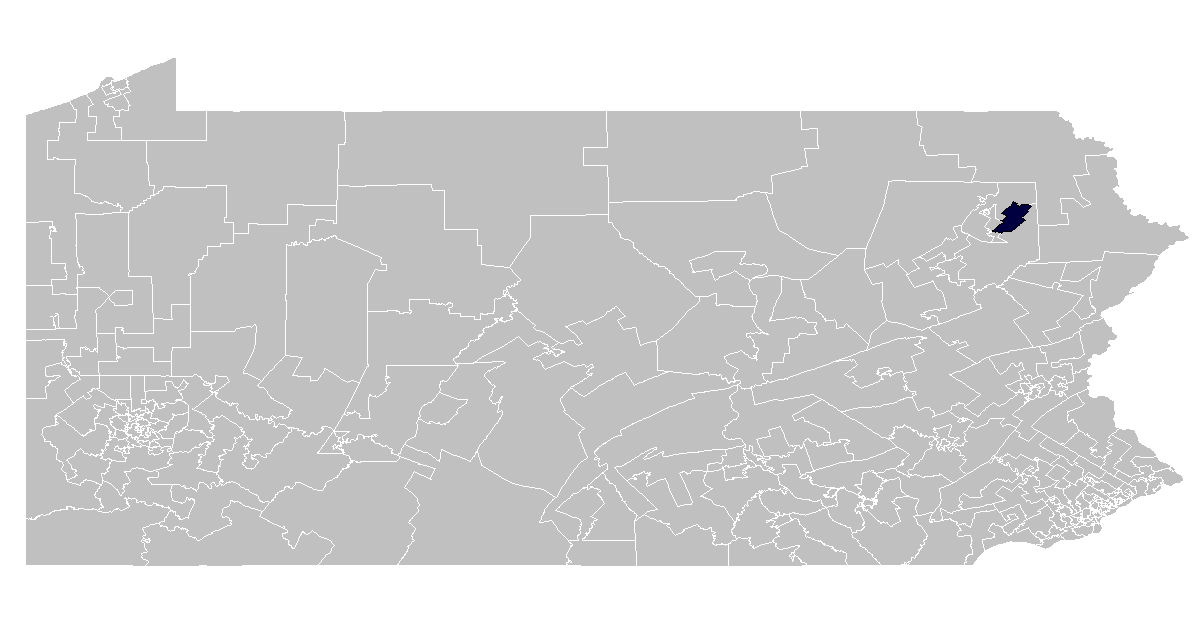
Representative
Kyle Mullins; D–Blakely

The 112th Pennsylvania House of Representatives District is located in Lackawanna County and includes the following areas:

- Archbald
- Blakely
- Carbondale
- Carbondale Township
- Dunmore
- Fell Township
- Jefferson Township
- Jermyn
- Jessup
- Mayfield
- Olyphant
- Throop
- Vandling

== Representatives ==
Representative	Party	Years	District home	Note
Prior to 1969, seats were apportioned by county.
Paul F. Crowley	Democrat	1969 – 1972		
Charles J. Volpe	Republican	1973 – 1974		
William McLane	Democrat	1975 – 1978		
Fred Belardi	Democrat	1979 – 2006		
Kenneth J. Smith	Democrat	2007 – 2012	Dunmore	
Kevin Haggerty	Democrat	2013 – 2014	Dunmore	Redistricting moved fellow incumbent Frank Farina into this seat; Haggerty lost the primary election
Frank Farina	Democrat	2015 – 2016	Jessup	Previously represented the 115th district
Kevin Haggerty	Democrat	2016 – 2018	Dunmore	Defeated Farina in 2016 primary rematch
Kyle Mullins	Democrat	2019 – Present	Blakely	
