= Pennsylvania House of Representatives, District 115 =

American legislative district

Pennsylvania's 115th State House of Representatives district
Representative
Maureen Madden; D–Coolbaugh Township
- Population (2022): 62,673

The 115th Pennsylvania House of Representatives District is located in northeastern Pennsylvania and has been represented by Democrat Maureen Madden since 2017.

== District profile ==
The 115th Pennsylvania House of Representatives District is located in Monroe County and includes the following areas:

- Barrett Township
- Coolbaugh Township
- Middle Smithfield Township (PART)
  - District West
- Mount Pocono
- Paradise Township
- Pocono Township
- Price Township
- Stroud Township (PART)
  - Districts 02, 04, and 05

== Representatives ==
Representative	Party	Years	District home	Note
Prior to 1969, seats were apportioned by county.
Joseph G. Wargo	Democrat	1969 – 1985		
Edward G. Staback	Democrat	1985 – 2013	Olyphant	
Frank Farina	Democrat	2013 – 2014	Jessup	Subsequently, represented the 112th district
District moved from Lackawanna & Wayne Counties to Monroe County after 2014
David Parker	Republican	2015 – 2016	Stroud Township	
Maureen Madden	Democratic	2017 – present	Coolbaugh Township	Incumbent
