= Samuel H. Smith (politician) =

American politician (born 1955)

Sam Smith
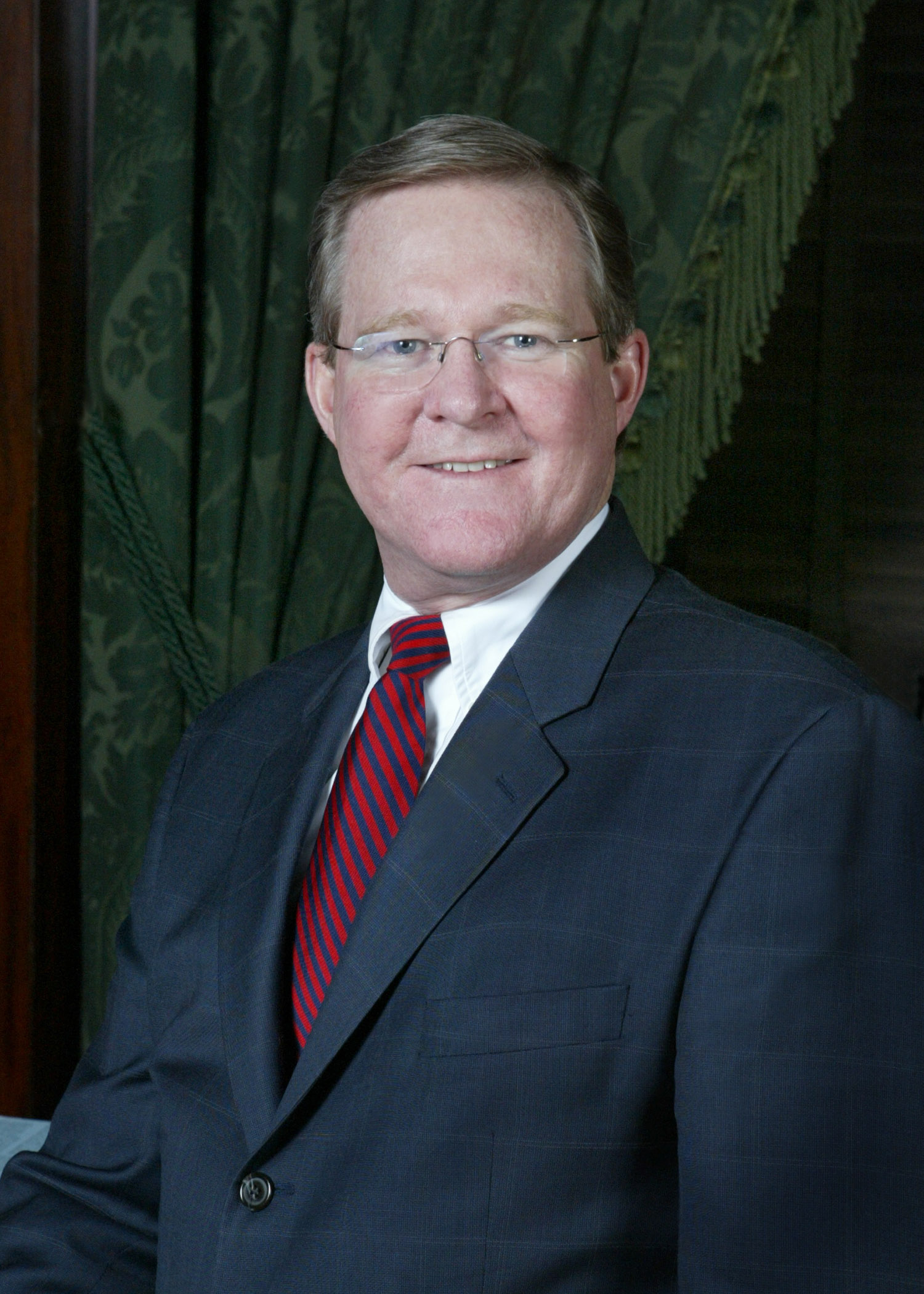
- Official portrait, 2008

139th Speaker of the Pennsylvania House of Representatives
- In office January 4, 2011 – November 30, 2014
- Preceded by: Keith McCall
- Succeeded by: Mike Turzai

Republican Leader of the Pennsylvania House of Representatives
- In office April 15, 2003 – November 30, 2010
- Preceded by: John Perzel
- Succeeded by: Mike Turzai

Republican Whip of the Pennsylvania House of Representatives
- In office January 2, 2001 – April 15, 2003
- Preceded by: Donald Snyder
- Succeeded by: Brett Feese

Member of the Pennsylvania House of Representatives from the 66th district
- In office January 6, 1987 – November 30, 2014
- Preceded by: Eugene Smith
- Succeeded by: Cris Dush

Personal details
- Born: Samuel H. Smith; August 10, 1955 (age 70) Punxsutawney, Pennsylvania, U.S.
- Party: Republican
- Spouse: Donna Smith
- Children: 2
- Education: Penn State University (BA)
- Website: www.samsmithpahouse.com

Samuel H. "Sam" Smith (born August 10, 1955) is an American politician and former Republican member of the Pennsylvania House of Representatives for the 66th District who served from 1986 to 2015. The district included portions of Jefferson, Indiana and Armstrong counties. He was elected Speaker in January 2011 and served until January 2015, when he was succeeded by Mike Turzai.

== Early life and education ==
Born in Punxsutawney, Pennsylvania, Smith attended and graduated from Punxsutawney Area High School and later earned a bachelor's degree in journalism from Penn State University.

== Career ==
After working for several years in the construction industry, he later took a job with the Pennsylvania Department of Revenue. In 1986 Smith was elected to succeed his father, Eugene "Snuffy" Smith, who had represented the 66th district since 1963.

He served as Minority Leader from 2007 through 2010, and spoke for his party on the floor and led debate on major issues. Prior to the Democratic takeover in the 2006 election, Smith served as Majority Leader where he was responsible for planning, discussion, debate and final passage of legislation. He was also majority whip through 2004.

Following the 2010 election, which saw Republicans regain their House majority, Smith was elected Speaker when the House reconvened.

== Personal life ==
Smith serves on the Indiana University of Pennsylvania Council of Trustees and the Punxsutawney College Trust that supports the Punxsutawney Campus of IUP. Inside his district is Gobbler's Knob, the home of Punxsutawney Phil, he is also a member of the Punxsutawney Groundhog Club.

He is married to Donna Bruder-Smith and has a son, Zachary and a daughter, Alexandra.

== See also ==
- Speaker of the Pennsylvania House of Representatives
- List of Pennsylvania state legislatures

Political offices
Preceded by Keith McCall	Speaker of the Pennsylvania House of Representatives; 2011–2015	Succeeded by Mike Turzai
Pennsylvania House of Representatives
Preceded by Eugene Smith	Member of the Pennsylvania House of Representatives for the 66th District; 1987–2015	Succeeded by Cris Dush
