= Lederer =

Lederer is a surname of German origin, meaning "leatherworker", and a common Jewish surname. Notable people with the surname include:

- Ábrahám Lederer (1827–1916), Czech-Hungarian educator and writer
- Andrew J. Lederer (born before 1988), American comedian
- Charles Lederer (1910–1976), American film writer and director
- Charles Lederer (cartoonist) (1856–1925), American cartoonist
- Edith Lederer (born 1943), American journalist
- Emil Lederer (1882–1939), German economist
- Ephraim Lederer (1862–1925), American lawyer
- Eppie Lederer (AKA Esther "Eppie" Pauline Friedman-Lederer AKA Ann Landers, 1918–2002), American advice columnist
- Felix Lederer (1877–1957), Czech musician and conductor
- Francis Lederer (1899–2000), Czech actor
- Franz Lederer (football manager) (born 1963), Austrian football manager
- George Lederer (c. 1862–1938), American producer and director on Broadway
- Gordan Lederer (1958–1991), Croatian photographer and cameraman
- Gretchen Lederer (1891–1955), German movie actress of the silent era
- Helen Lederer (born 1954), Welsh comedian, writer and actress
- Howard Lederer (born 1963), U.S. professional poker player
- Hugo Lederer (1871–1940), German sculptor
- Ignaz Freiherr von Lederer (1769–1849), Austrian general
- Ivo John Lederer (1929–1998), Croatian-born American diplomatic historian
- Jerome F. Lederer (1902–2004), U.S. aviation safety pioneer
- John Lederer (1644 – after 1672), German-born doctor and explorer of the Appalachian Mountains
- Julius Lederer (entomologist) (1821–1870), Austrian entomologist
- Julius Lederer (businessman) (1917–1999), American business executive and innovator
- Katy Lederer (born before 1998), U.S. author and poet
- Klaus Lederer (born 1974), German politician
- Laura Lederer (born 1951), U.S. government official and anti-trafficking activist
- Marianne Lederer (1934–2026), French translation scholar
- Marie Lederer (1927–2025), onetime member of the Pennsylvania House of Representatives
- Michael Lederer (born 1956), American novelist, short story writer, poet and playwright
- Miles W. Lederer (1897–1953), American politician
- Oliver Lederer (born 1978), Austrian footballer and coach
- Otto Lederer (1886–1965), Austro-Hungary-born American film actor
- Paul Lederer (born before 2004), Hungarian-born Australian businessman and association football team owner
- Pepi Lederer (1910–1935), U.S. actress
- Raymond F. Lederer (1938–2008), U.S. Congressman from Pennsylvania's 3rd district
- Remo Lederer (born 1968), German ski jumper
- Richard Lederer (writer) (born 1938), American author, speaker, and teacher
- Richard Lederer (bridge player) (1894–1941), Austro-Hungary-born British bridge player
- Richard Lederer (musician) (born 1971), Austrian metal musician
- Serena Lederer (1867–1943), Hungarian art collector and friend of Gustav Klimt
- William Lederer (1912–2009), American writer and naval officer, co-author of The Ugly American
- William J. Lederer (Pennsylvania politician) (1924–2008), onetime member of the Pennsylvania House of Representatives
