= Jose Giral =

Jose Giral may refer to:

- José Giral (1879–1962), prime minister of Spain
- Jose Giral (Pennsylvania politician), member of the Pennsylvania House of Representatives
