= Clifford Gray =

Clifford Gray may refer to:

- Clifford Gray (politician) (born 1940), member of the Pennsylvania House of Representatives
- Clifford Gray (athlete) (1892–1969), American bobsledder, songwriter and actor

== See also ==
- Clifford Grey (1887–1941), English songwriter, librettist and actor
