= Kitty Carlisle =

American actress and singer (1910–2007)

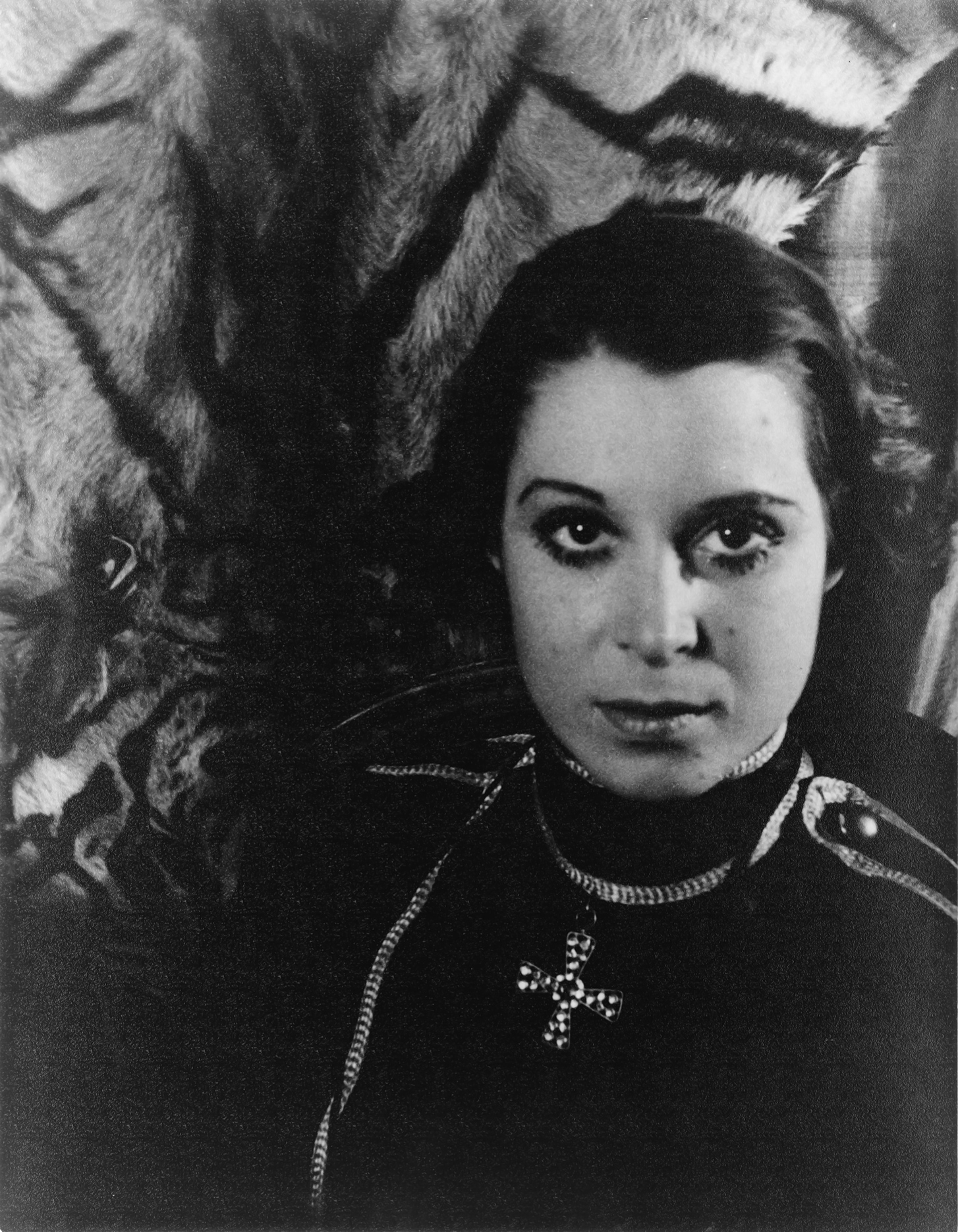
- Photograph by Carl Van Vechten, 1933
- Born: Catherine Conn; September 3, 1910; New Orleans, Louisiana, U.S.
- Died: April 17, 2007 (aged 96); New York City, U.S.
- Resting place: Ferncliff Cemetery
- Other name: Kitty Carlisle Hart
- Education: University of Paris; London School of Economics; Royal Academy of Dramatic Art
- Occupations: Actress; singer; TV personality; spokesman
- Years active: 1932–2006
- Spouse: Moss Hart (m. 1946; died 1961)
- Children: 2

Kitty Carlisle Hart (born Catherine Conn; September 3, 1910 – April 17, 2007) was an American stage and screen actress, opera singer, television personality and spokesperson for the arts. She was the leading lady in the Marx Brothers movie A Night at the Opera (1935) and was a regular panelist on the television game show To Tell The Truth (1956–1978). She served 20 years on the New York State Council on the Arts.

In 1991, she received the National Medal of Arts from President George H. W. Bush. She was inducted into the American Theater Hall of Fame in 1999.

== Early life ==
Kitty Carlisle was born Catherine Conn (pronounced Cohen) in New Orleans, Louisiana, of German-Jewish heritage. Her grandfather, Ben Holzman, was a mayor of Shreveport, Louisiana, and a Confederate veteran of the American Civil War. He had been a gunner on the CSS Virginia, the Confederate ironclad warship that fought the USS Monitor at the Battle of Hampton Roads. Her father, Joseph Conn, MD, was a gynecologist who died when she was ten years old. Her mother, Hortense Holzman Conn, was eager for her daughter to be accepted by local society. Hortense’s desire to assimilate was so great, a taxi driver once asked if her daughter was Jewish, and she answered, "She may be, but I'm not."

Carlisle's mother took her to Europe in 1921, where she hoped Kitty would marry European royalty, believing nobility were more likely to marry a Jewish girl. They traveled around Europe and often lived in what Carlisle recalled as "the worst room of the best hotel". Kitty was educated at the Château Mont-Choisi in Lausanne, Switzerland, then at the Sorbonne and the London School of Economics. She studied acting in London at the Royal Academy of Dramatic Art. She studied singing with Estelle Liebling, the teacher of Beverly Sills, in New York City.

== Career ==
=== Acting ===
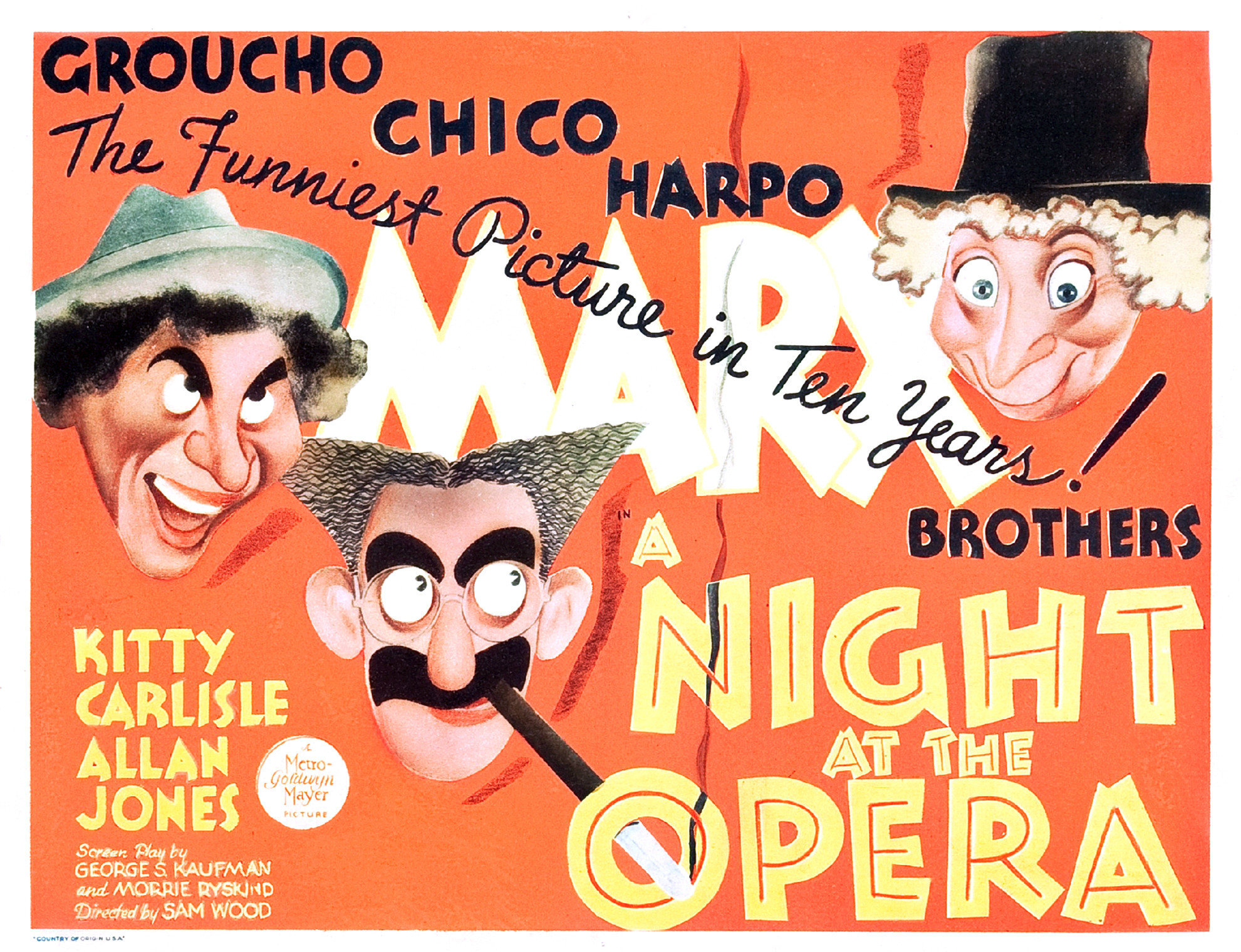
1935 lobby card for film co-starring Carlisle

After returning to New York in 1932 with her mother, she appeared, billed as Kitty Carlisle, on Broadway in several operettas and musical comedies, and in the American premiere of Benjamin Britten's The Rape of Lucretia. She also sang the title role in Georges Bizet's Carmen in Salt Lake City. She privately studied voice with Juilliard teacher Anna E. Schoen-Rene, who had been a student of Pauline Viardot-Garcia and Manuel Garcia.

Carlisle's early movies included Murder at the Vanities (1934), A Night at the Opera (1935) with the Marx Brothers, and two films with Bing Crosby, She Loves Me Not (1934) and Here Is My Heart (1934). Carlisle resumed her film career later in life, appearing in Woody Allen's Radio Days (1987) and in Six Degrees of Separation (1993), as well as on stage in a revival of On Your Toes, replacing Dina Merrill. Her last movie appearance was in Catch Me If You Can (2002) in which she played herself in a dramatization of a 1970s To Tell the Truth episode.

For her contributions to the film industry, Carlisle was inducted into the Hollywood Walk of Fame in 1960 with a motion pictures star located at 6611 Hollywood Boulevard.

=== Television ===
Carlisle became a household name through the television game show To Tell the Truth, where she was a regular panelist from 1956 to 1978, and later appeared on revivals of the series in 1980, 1990–91 and one episode in 2000. She was also a semi-regular panelist on Password, Match Game, Missing Links, and What's My Line?

=== Opera ===
On December 31, 1966, Carlisle made her debut with the Metropolitan Opera, as Prince Orlofsky in Strauss's Die Fledermaus. She sang the role 10 more times that season, then returned in 1973 for four more performances. Her final performance with the company was on July 7, 1973. She reprised this role during the Beverly Sills Farewell Gala in October 1980.

== Personal life ==
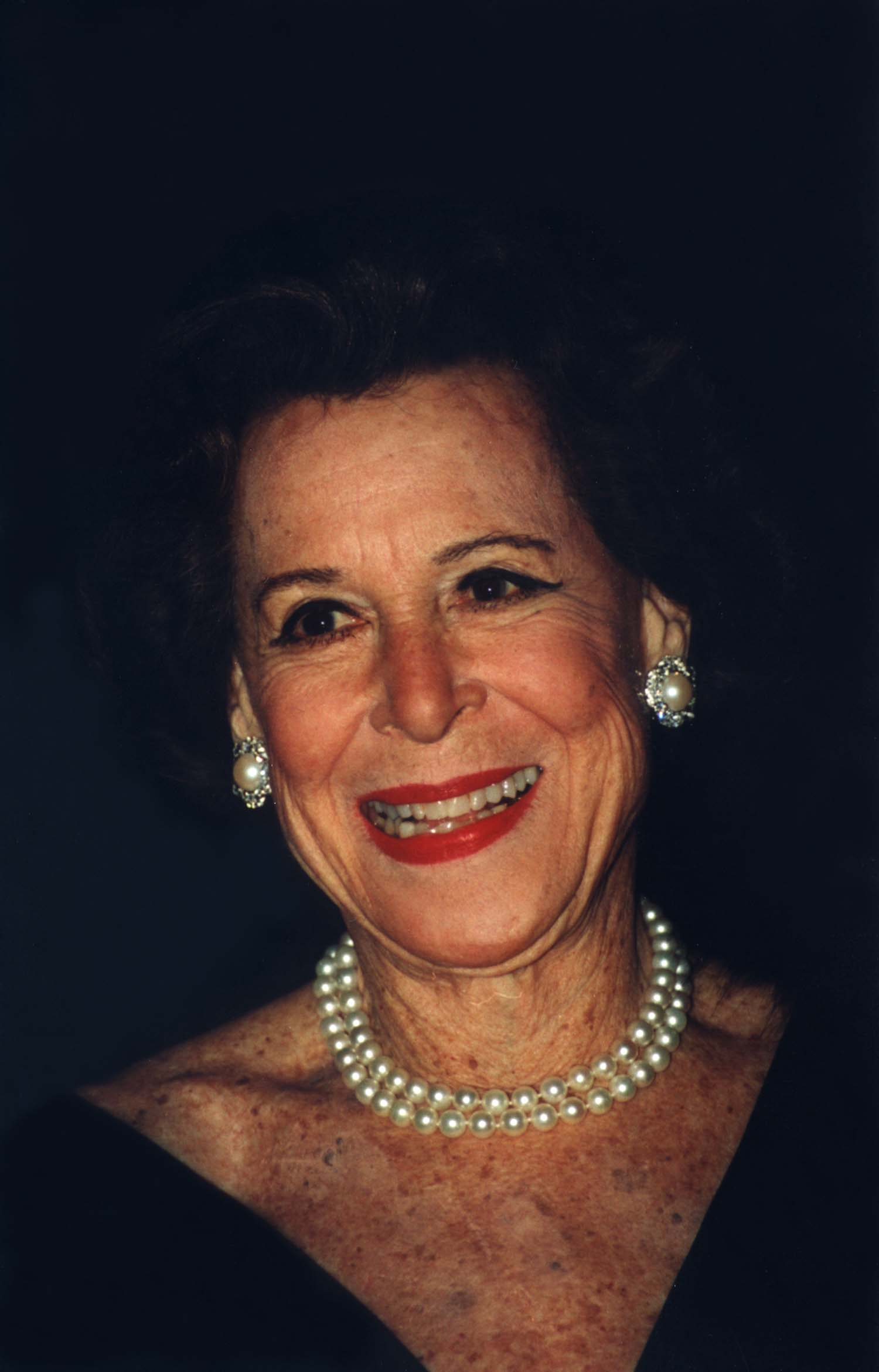
Carlisle in 2000

Carlisle dated George Gershwin in 1933 "until George went to California". On August 10, 1946, she married playwright and theatrical producer Moss Hart, whom she met at the Bucks County Playhouse in New Hope, Pennsylvania. They had two children. Hart died on December 20, 1961, at their home in Palm Springs, California. She never remarried, although she briefly dated former governor and presidential candidate Thomas E. Dewey after the death of his wife. During the 1980s and 1990s, Carlisle was the partner of diplomatic historian Ivo John Lederer, a relationship that lasted 16 years until Lederer's death in 1998. In her later years, she kept company with financier and art collector Roy Neuberger.

Carlisle was known for her gracious manner and personal elegance, and she became prominent in New York City social circles as she crusaded for financial support of the arts. She was appointed to various statewide councils, and was chairperson of the New York State Council on the Arts from 1976 to 1996. One of the two state theaters housed at The Egg performing arts venue in Albany is named the Kitty Carlisle Hart Theatre. She also served on the boards of various New York City cultural institutions and made an appearance at the annual CIBC World Markets Miracle Day, a children's charity event. She was elected a Fellow of the American Academy of Arts and Sciences in 1997.

Carlisle also widely performed her one-woman show, in which she told anecdotes about the great men of American musical theater she had known, notably George Gershwin (who had proposed marriage), Irving Berlin, Kurt Weill, Oscar Hammerstein, Alan Jay Lerner, and Frederick Loewe, and interspersed with songs that had made each of them famous.

=== Historic preservation ===
Carlisle was a longtime champion of historic preservation in New York City and State. While chair of the New York State Council on the Arts (NYSCA), from 1976 to 1996, she directed many millions of dollars in support to preservation projects, from the Niagara Frontier to Staten Island. This was in an effort to keep historic preservation as a core program of the New York State Council on the Arts, the only arts council in America that provides such funding. In 1980, she was crowned Queen of the Beaux Arts Ball, an annual event run by the Beaux Arts Society (American comedian Paul Lynde was crowned King the same year).

In recognition of this legacy, the Historic Districts Council presented its Landmarks Lion award to her in 2003.

== Death ==
Carlisle died on April 17, 2007, aged 96, from congestive heart failure resulting from a prolonged bout of pneumonia. She had been in and out of the hospital since she contracted pneumonia some time prior to November 2006. One of her last public appearances was as the guest / flower layer at the Noel Coward Society's 108th birthday celebration of the Master at Manhattan's Gershwin Theatre in December, 2006. She died in her Upper East Side, Manhattan apartment, with her son, Christopher Hart, at her bedside. She was interred in a crypt next to her husband, Moss Hart, at Ferncliff Cemetery in Hartsdale, New York.

== Theatre credits ==
- Champagne, Sec (1933)
- White Horse Inn (1936)
- French Without Tears (1936)
- Three Waltzes (1937)
- Night of January 16th (1938)
- Walk With Music (1940)
- Larceny with Music (1943)
- The Merry Widow (1943)
- Design for Living (1943)
- There's Always Juliet (1944)
- The Rape of Lucretia (1948)
- The Man Who Came to Dinner (1949)
- Anniversary Waltz (1954)
- Die Fledermaus (1967)
- You Never Know (1975)
- On Your Toes (1983)
- Wit & Wisdom (2003)

== Filmography ==
- Murder at the Vanities (1934)
- She Loves Me Not (1934)
- Here Is My Heart (1934)
- A Night at the Opera (1935)
- Larceny with Music (1943)
- Hollywood Canteen (1944)
- Radio Days (1987)
- Six Degrees of Separation (1993)
- Catch Me If You Can (2002; cameo)

=== Television ===
- I've Got A Secret - Guest panelist early 1950s CBS
- What's Going On - Panelist (1954 ABC)
- What's My Line? – Guest panelist on both the CBS and the syndicated versions
- To Tell the Truth – Panelist (1956–68, 1969–78, 1980–81, 1990–91, 2000)
- The Movie Masters – Panelist (1989–90)
- Kojak (1 episode, 1990)
- "Beyond Vaudeville" – Interview (January 27, 1993)

== Cultural activities ==
- Vice Chair of the New York State Council of the Arts 1971–1976
- Chair of the New York State Council of the Arts – 1976 – c. 1996
- Chair Emeritus of the New York State Council of the Arts
- Board member of Empire State College
- Honorary trustee of the Metropolitan Museum of Art
- Honorary trustee of the Museum of Modern Art
- Board member Emeritus in Memoriam of The Center for Arts Education
- Board member of the Center for Inter-American Relations 1972–1976
- Chair of the New York Statewide Conference of Women
- Special consultant to Governor Nelson Rockefeller on Women's Opportunities.
- Honorary Life Director of the Franklin & Eleanor Roosevelt Institute (FERI)
- Life Member of the Beaux Arts Society, Inc. (1980–2007)
- Keynote speaker at the San Francisco Art Institute (SFAI) graduation ceremony, 1999
- Member of the Peabody Awards Board of Jurors from 1977 to 1983

== Bibliography ==
- Carlisle, Kitty (1988). Kitty: An Autobiography. New York: Doubleday. ISBN 0-385-24425-8. OCLC 18070708.
- Kennedy, Harold J. (1978). No Pickle, No Performance. An Irreverent Theatrical Excursion from Tallulah to Travolta. New York: Doubleday.
