= Leder =

The German word Leder means and corresponds to English word leather. As a surname, it may refer to:

- Johann Heinrich Leder, established the Lichte porcelain (GmbH) in Lichte Thuringia
- Herbert J. Leder
- Mimi Leder, film director
- Philip Leder
  - Nirenberg and Leder experiment, named after him
- Marc J. Leder, American businessman and Republican donor
- Stephan Hermlin, born Rudolf Leder
- Patrick Leder, founder of Leder Games

Other uses include:

- Leder, a fictional character in Mother 3

== See also ==
- Lederer
