= James M. McIntyre =

American politician

Member of the Pennsylvania House of Representatives from the 180th district
- In office January 4, 1983 – November 30, 1984
- Preceded by: Clifford Gray
- Succeeded by: Ralph Acosta

Member of the Pennsylvania House of Representatives from the 178 district
- In office January 7, 1975 – November 30, 1982
- Preceded by: Harry Comer
- Succeeded by: Roy Reinard

Personal details
- Born: January 21, 1916 Philadelphia, Pennsylvania
- Died: October 8, 1991 (aged 73) Philadelphia, Pennsylvania
- Party: Democratic

James M. McIntyre (January 21, 1916 – October 8, 1991) was a former Democratic member of the Pennsylvania House of Representatives.
