= Pennsylvania House of Representatives, District 180 =

American legislative district

Pennsylvania's 180th State House of Representatives district
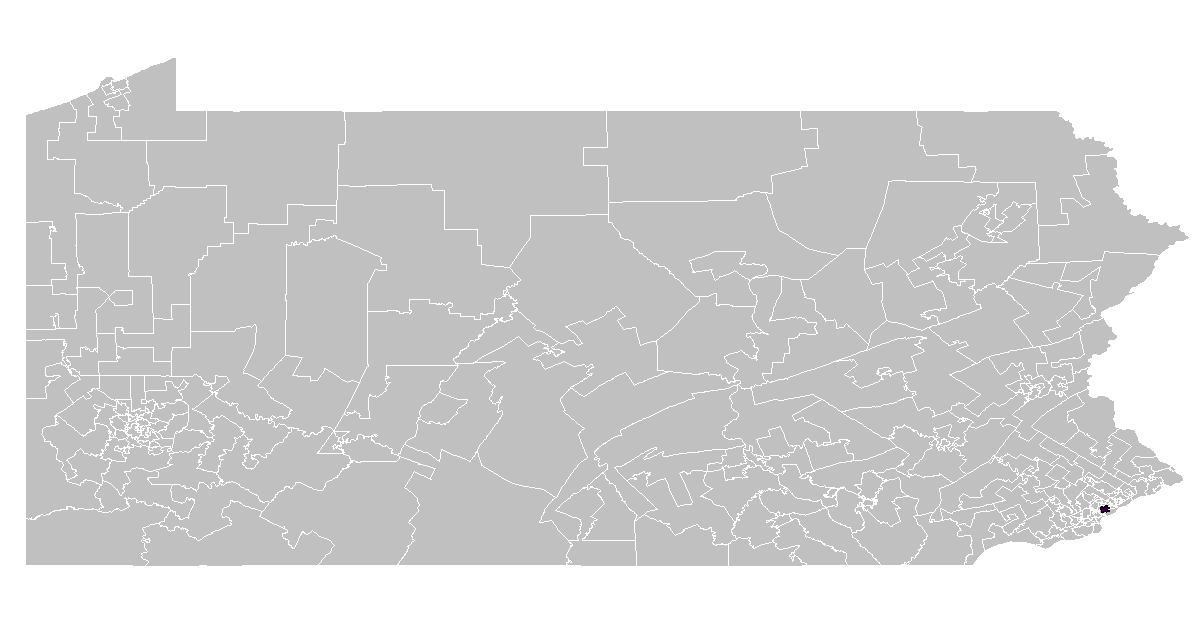
Representative
Jose Giral; D–Philadelphia
- Demographics: 34.2% White; 23.1% Black; 62.9% Hispanic
- Population (2011) • Citizens of voting age: 61,423; 40,650

The 180th Pennsylvania House of Representatives District is located in Philadelphia and has been represented since 2023 by Jose Giral.

== District profile ==
The 180th Pennsylvania House of Representatives District is located in Philadelphia County and encompasses the Franklin Institute and the Philadelphia Zoo. It also includes the following areas:

- Ward 07
- Ward 33
- Ward 42 [PART, Divisions 01 and 23]
- Ward 45 [PART, Divisions 08, 09, 10, 11, 13, 14, 16, 17, 19 and 21]

== Representatives ==
Representative	Party	Years	District home	Note
Prior to 1969, seats were apportioned by county.
German Quiles	Democrat	1969 – 1970		
William J. Lederer	Democratic	1971 – 1972		
Raymond F. Lederer	Democratic	1973 – 1976		
Clifford Gray	Democratic	1977 – 1982		
James M. McIntyre	Democratic	1983 – 1984		
Ralph D. Acosta	Democratic	1985 – 1994		
Benjamin Ramos	Democratic	1995 – 2000		
Angel Cruz	Democratic	2001 – 2023	Philadelphia	
Jose Giral	Democratic	2023 – present	Philadelphia	Incumbent

== Recent election results ==
PA House election, 2010: Pennsylvania House, District 180
Party	Candidate	Votes	%	±%
Democratic	Angel Cruz	7,308	100.0	
Margin of victory				
Turnout		7,308	100.0	

PA House election, 2012: Pennsylvania House, District 180
Party	Candidate	Votes	%	±%
Democratic	Angel Cruz	16,913	100.0	
Margin of victory				
Turnout		16,913	100.0	

PA House election, 2014: Pennsylvania House, District 180
Party	Candidate	Votes	%	±%
Democratic	Angel Cruz	5,827	100.0	
Margin of victory				
Turnout		5,827	100.0	

PA House election, 2016: Pennsylvania House, District 180
Party	Candidate	Votes	%	±%
Democratic	Angel Cruz	17,190	100.0	
Margin of victory				
Turnout		17,190	100	
