= Fortunato Perri =

American politician

Fortunato N. Perri

Member of the Pennsylvania House of Representatives from the 175th district
- In office January 2, 1973 – November 30, 1976
- Preceded by: John Pezak
- Succeeded by: Robert Borski

Personal details
- Born: December 15, 1936 Philadelphia, Pennsylvania, USA
- Died: September 4, 2020 (aged 83) Philadelphia, Pennsylvania, USA
- Party: Republican

Fortunato N. Perri (December 15, 1936 – September 4, 2020) was a former Republican member of the Pennsylvania House of Representatives. He served as a Judge on the Philadelphia Traffic Court from 1997 until 2005 and as Senior Judge from 2006 until 2013. He previously served as an Administrative Judge from 2000 until 2002. In 2013 Perri pleaded guilty to conspiracy, mail and wire fraud. In 2015, he was sentenced to two years probation. He died on September 4, 2020, in Frankford.
