= Angel Cruz =

American politician (born 1965)

Member of the Pennsylvania House of Representatives from the 180th district
- In office January 2, 2001 – November 30, 2022
- Preceded by: Benjamin Ramos
- Succeeded by: Jose Giral

Personal details
- Born: September 14, 1965 (age 60) Philadelphia, Pennsylvania, U.S.
- Party: Democratic
- Spouse: Maria

Angel L. Cruz (born September 14, 1965) is an American politician who served as a Democratic member of the Pennsylvania House of Representatives for the 180th district from 2001-2022. Cruz was a member of the Pennsylvania Legislative Black Caucus.

== Early life ==
Cruz was born in Philadelphia, Pennsylvania on September 14, 1965. He graduated from Northeast Catholic High School in 1985 and attended Temple University.

== Political career ==
Cruz started his career as an aide to Philadelphia City Councilmember Rick Mariano. After being elected to the Pennsylvania House of Representatives in 2000, he has served as a member of the Pennsylvania Democratic Party State Committee from 2003 to 2006, as assistant secretary of the Philadelphia Democratic City Committee, and committeeman-at-large of the Democratic National Committee.

In 2008 and 2016, Cruz was elected as a delegate to the Democratic National Convention. From 2019 to 2020, he served as a member of the Pennsylvania Statewide Suicide Prevention Task Force and from 2021 to 2022 on the board of the Pennsylvania Higher Education Assistance Agency. He retired from the Pennsylvania House of Representatives in 2022 after serving ten terms.

Cruz is the Ward Leader of the 7th Ward Democratic Executive Committee.
