= Robert Borski =

American politician (born 1948)

Bob Borski
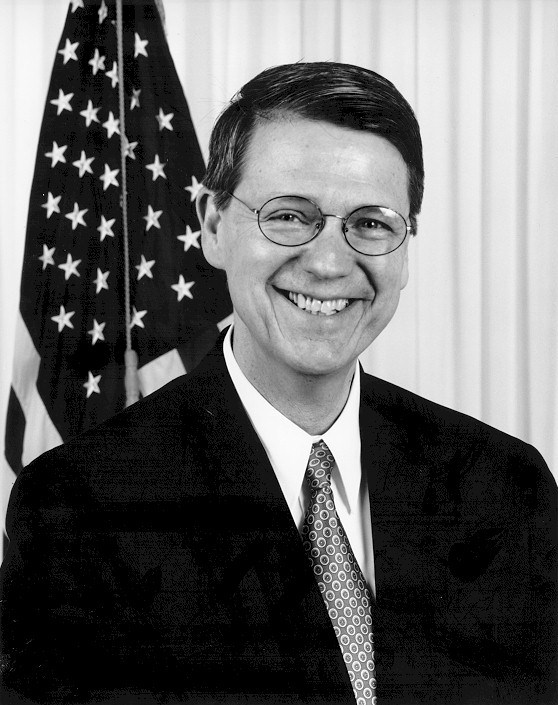

Member of the U.S. House of Representatives from Pennsylvania's 3rd district
- In office January 3, 1983 – January 3, 2003
- Preceded by: Joseph Smith
- Succeeded by: Joe Hoeffel (redistricted)

Member of the Pennsylvania House of Representatives from the 175th district
- In office January 4, 1977 – November 30, 1982
- Preceded by: Fortunato Perri
- Succeeded by: Gerard Kosinski

Personal details
- Born: Robert Anthony Borski Jr. October 20, 1948 (age 77) Philadelphia, Pennsylvania, U.S.
- Party: Democratic
- Spouse: Karen
- Children: 5
- Education: University of Baltimore (BA)

Robert Anthony Borski Jr. (born October 20, 1948) is an American politician. He was a Democratic Party state representative and later a Congressman from the U.S. state of Pennsylvania from 1983 until 2003, representing the state's 3rd congressional district.

== Biography ==
Borski was born in Philadelphia, Pennsylvania. He graduated from Frankford High School. He later graduated from the University of Baltimore in 1971. He was a member of the Pennsylvania state house of representatives from 1977 to 1982.

=== Congress ===
In 1982, he took on GOP Representative Charles F. Dougherty in the 3rd Congressional District, which had been renumbered from the 4th after the 1980 Census. 1982 was a rough year for Republicans due to a recession and Borski would be a beneficiary of the public discontent. He also was helped by some friendly redistricting that shifted some heavily Democratic wards to the 3rd. Borski scored a narrow victory of less than 3,000 votes—in the process, ousting the last Republican to represent a significant portion of Philadelphia in the House. The Borski-Dougherty battles would be fought out in this district three more times in 1992, 1998, and 2000 with Borski victorious each time.

In his 20 years in Congress, Borski rose to become the second-ranking Democrat on the Transportation and Infrastructure Committee. He was generally classed as a liberal Democrat, but opposed abortion in most cases.

On October 10, 2002, Robert Borski was among the 81 House Democrats who voted in favor of authorizing the invasion of Iraq. In 2003, the post office where Borski's father once carried mail was renamed in his honor.

=== Redistricting ===
In 2002, the Republican-controlled State Legislature threw Borski a curve. Pennsylvania was due to lose two districts as a result of the 2000 United States census, and the legislature dismantled his northeast Philadelphia district. Borski's home was drawn into the Montgomery County-based 13th District of two-term Democrat Joe Hoeffel. They expected that either Borski or Hoeffel would be bloodied from the resulting primary election. However, Borski decided not to run, instead retiring from Congress and allowing Hoeffel to avoid a costly primary campaign.

=== Later career ===
After retiring, Borski formed his own lobbying firm, Borski Associates. Governor Ed Rendell hired Borski in 2003 to help lobby for the state of Pennsylvania in Congress.

In 2010, Politics Magazine named him one of the most influential Democrats in Pennsylvania.

U.S. House of Representatives
Preceded by Joseph Smith	Member of the U.S. House of Representatives from Pennsylvania's 3rd congressional district 1983–2003	Succeeded by Phil English
U.S. order of precedence (ceremonial)
Preceded by Bob Walker as Former U.S. Representative	Order of precedence of the United States as Former U.S. Representative	Succeeded by Curt Weldon as Former U.S. Representative
