= German Quiles =

American politician (1939–2026)

Member of the Pennsylvania House of Representatives from the 180th district
- In office January 7, 1969 – November 30, 1970
- Preceded by: District Created
- Succeeded by: William Lederer

Personal details
- Born: May 9, 1939 Añasco, Puerto Rico
- Died: October 6, 2026 (aged 87) Newtown Township, Bucks County, Pennsylvania, U.S.
- Party: Democratic
- Spouse(s): Dolores; Maria
- Children: 3
- Occupation: Politician; businessman

Germán W. Quiles (May 9, 1939 – October 6, 2026) was an American politician and businessman. Born in Anasco, Puerto Rico, Quiles served as a delegate in the 1967–1968 Pennsylvania Constitutional Convention and served one term in the Pennsylvania House of Representatives, representing Philadelphia, from 1969 to 1970. He was the first Puerto Rican elected to the Pennsylvania House. In 2008, Quiles and his family were convicted of an international money laundering scheme by the United States Immigration and Customs Enforcement using their Aruba Auto Tag Service and Aruba Check Cashing business in Philadelphia.

== Early life ==
German W. Quiles was born in Anasco, Puerto Rico, on May 9, 1939. At the age of six, he moved to Philadelphia. He attended Luis Munoz Rivera School.

== Career ==
Quiles was a credit manager and constable in 1966. He was a credit manager at a furniture store until 1968. He was the first Puerto Rican constable of Philadelphia.

He was elected as delegate to the 1967–1968 Pennsylvania Constitutional Convention. He received the nickname "Little Dynamite" for his speaking style. In January 1968, he introduced a constitutional proposal to authorize the use of state tax funds to aid parochial and private schools. The proposal was rejected by lieutenant governor Raymond J. Broderick on the grounds it was beyond the limited agenda of the convention and Quiles subsequently withdrew his appeal for the proposal.

Quiles defeated incumbent William J. Lederer in the Democratic primary in 1968. He was subsequently elected to the Pennsylvania House of Representatives, representing district 180 (Philadelphia County), serving from 1969 to 1970. He was the first Puerto Rican elected to the Pennsylvania House. In February 1969, he introduced a bill that would require welfare recipients to carry an identification card and fingerprints. In September 1969, he argued that language classes implemented in his district did not support Puerto Rican students because "the kids don't understand the dialect" of the bilingual teachers from Latin American countries and there were not "nearly enough" Spanish-speaking teachers. In October 1969, he asked for an investigation into the Philadelphia Housing Authority's rental practices in his district. He stated that in some cases members of the Puerto Rican community "have been waiting for as long as three years for admission to housing projects" and argued there was a "major lack of Puerto Rican employees in housing authority jobs". In October 1969, he introduced a House resolution that would require interpreters be present at court proceeding that involve Spanish-speaking defendants. He was defeated for re-election by William J. Lederer.

He was president of the Puerto Rican Citizens for Community Affairs. In 1970, he led the group to request a formal resolution by Philadelphia City Council to classify Puerto Ricans as "brown people", arguing that being classified as neither white or black impacted equal opportunity in getting jobs and education for the community.

Quiles went on to be employed for 45 years by the City of Philadelphia. First as a deputy in the Sheriff's Department and later worked for the Pennsylvania Court of Common Pleas in Philadelphia County.. He retired in 2004. He was co-owner of Aruba Auto Tag Service and Aruba Check Cashing.

== Legal issues ==
On August 28, 1969, Quiles was arrested at his home in Philadelphia for "indecent assault" of an 11 year old girl who worked as a house cleaner for him in August 1968.

On July 5, 1970, Quiles and his friend Rafael Pena were involved in an altercation with police sergeant Robert Simkins when Simkins tried to break up a fight at the Girard Ballroom on Girard Avenue in Philadelphia. Quiles was arrested and treated at the Episcopal Hospital with Pena for cuts and bruises from the altercation. Quiles stated that he was "hit with nightsticks" at least four times and was "slapped around" when taken back to the 26th district station. The police stated that Quiles had jumped from a fire escape and had also struck Simkins on the chin twice. Quiles was charged with assault and battery of an officer and resisting arrest. Simkins testified that he was punched in the back of the head by Quiles while Quiles was running from pursuers and that Simkins had said to Quiles, "yo pal, I'm on your side". Quiles testified that his eye was full of blood and that he didn't know he had hit Simkins.

In January 2008, Quiles was charged on an international money laundering scheme with his wife Maria and daughter Gloria. The family were accused of laundering US$175,900 in "drug money" between September 2006 and January 2007 using their auto tag and check cashing business, Aruba Auto Tag Service and Aruba Check Cashing, on 5th Street in Philadelphia. The charges were for conspiracy, money laundering, and aiding and abetting. The United States Immigration and Customs Enforcement had recorded tapes from a confidential informant who had visited their business 35 times over 16 days. They were found guilty and convicted on January 17, 2008. Quiles and his wife faced 68 to 78 months in prison and his daughter faced 41 to 51 months.

== Personal life and death ==
Quiles married Dolores, and was later married to Maria. In the 1960s, Quiles lived in a row house in Philadelphia.

Quiles died at his home in Newtown Township, Bucks County, Pennsylvania, on October 6, 2026, at the age 87. He was survived by his wife of 46 years, Maria (Rosa) Quiles, and his six children. Quiles was buried at Newtown Cemetery.
