= Benjamin Ramos =

Puerto Rican politician

Member of the Pennsylvania House of Representatives from the 180th district
- In office January 3, 1995 – November 30, 2000
- Preceded by: Ralph Acosta
- Succeeded by: Angel Cruz

Personal details
- Born: August 31, 1956 (age 70) Aguas Buenas, Puerto Rico
- Party: Democratic
- Spouse: Carmen P.
- Children: Benjamin Ramos, Jr. Madeline Torres; Neftali Ramos; Nestor Ramos
- Education: Southern New Hampshire University (MEc)

Benjamin Ramos (born August 31, 1956) is a former Democratic member of the Pennsylvania House of Representatives. He represented more than 60,000 residents in Pennsylvania's 180th Legislative District from 1994 to 2000.

== Biography ==
Ramos was born in Puerto Rico and attended Thomas A. Edison High School in Philadelphia. He earned an M.S. degree in Community Economic Development from New Hampshire College (now Southern New Hampshire University). Prior to elective office, he served as Deputy Mayor of the City of Philadelphia.

He represented the 180th legislative district from 1995 until his defeat in the 2000 Democratic primary by Angel Cruz.

Ramos served as the Democratic Secretary of the Committee on Health and Human Services, the Urban Affairs, Liquor Control and the House Democratic Policy Committees. He was appointed by the Speaker of the Pennsylvania House of Representatives to serve on the Pennsylvania Adult Basic Education Interagency Coordinating Council well as the Select Committee on Pharmaceuticals and the Sub-Committee on School Violence.

Ramos was a member of the Pennsylvania Legislative Black Caucus, co-chair and member of the National Hispanic Cacus of State Legislators (NHCSL) and National Association of Latino Elected/Appointed Officials (NALEO), and secretary of the Black Elected Officials of Philadelphia.

In early 2003, newly elected Pennsylvania Governor Ed Rendell nominated him to serve as Secretary of the Commonwealth of Pennsylvania. However, Ramos withdrew from consideration in February 2003 amid legislative criticism over revelations that as a State Representative he was late in filing campaign-finance reports and was subject to fines, although all fines had been paid years prior. He would have been the first Latino to hold that post. He is currently the Regional Director of the Office of International Business Development for the Pennsylvania Department of Community & Economic Development.

Ramos most recently worked for the U.S. Census Bureau as a partnership coordinator and specialist, and was responsible for developing and nurturing productive partnerships to foster support for the 2010 Census in the Philadelphia region, as well as working with state, local and tribal governments, community-based organizations, faith-based groups, schools, media outlets and businesses.
