= John Pezak =

American politician

Member of the Pennsylvania House of Representatives from the 175th district
- In office January 7, 1969 – November 30, 1972
- Preceded by: District Created
- Succeeded by: Fortunato Perri

Member of the Pennsylvania House of Representatives from the Philadelphia County district
- In office January 5, 1965 – November 30, 1968

Personal details
- Born: October 25, 1913 Mayfield, Pennsylvania
- Died: June 7, 1998 (aged 84) Philadelphia, Pennsylvania
- Party: Democratic

John Pezak (October 25, 1913 – June 7, 1998) was a Democratic member of the Pennsylvania House of Representatives.
