= Gerard Kosinski =

American politician

Gerard A. Kosinski

Member of the Pennsylvania House of Representatives from the 175th district
- In office January 4, 1983 – November 30, 1992
- Preceded by: Robert Borski
- Succeeded by: Marie Lederer

Personal details
- Born: 1954 (age 71–72) Philadelphia, PA
- Party: Democratic
- Education: Northeast Catholic High School, Penn State University, Temple University School of Law
- Occupation: Judge, Philadelphia Municipal Court (2004 - Present)

Gerard A. Kosinski is a former Democratic member of the Pennsylvania House of Representatives.

He is a member of the American Polish Advisory Council and has received a number of awards from American Polonia.
