= Pennsylvania House of Representatives, District 175 =

American legislative district

Pennsylvania's 175th State House of Representatives district
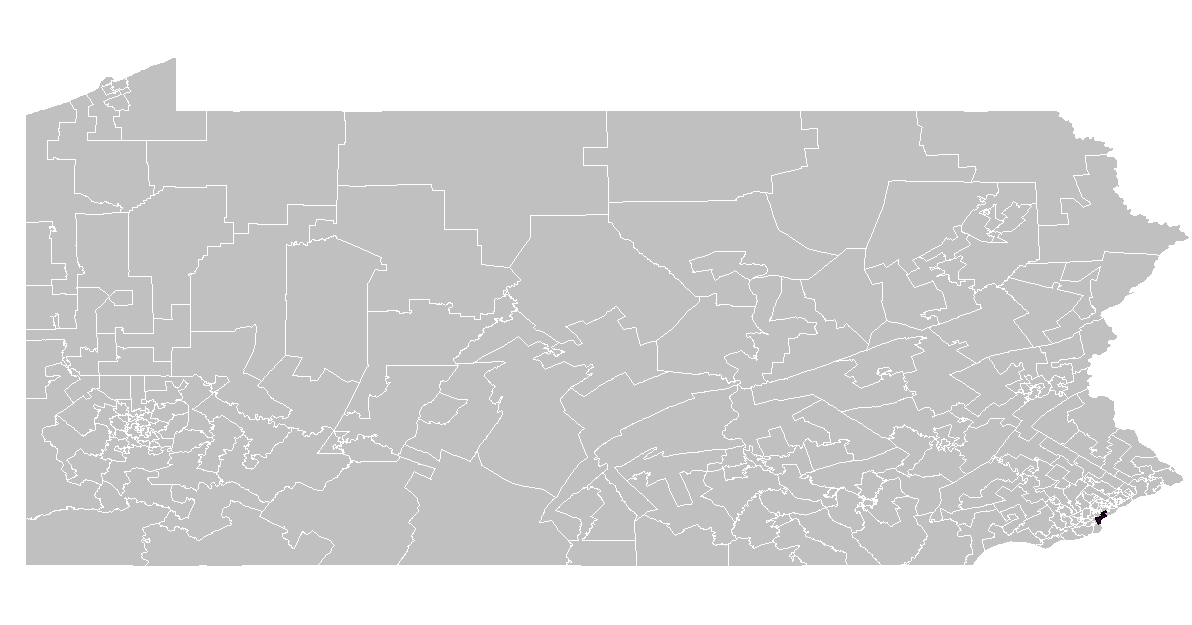
Representative
Mary Isaacson; D–Philadelphia

The 175th Pennsylvania House of Representatives District is located in Philadelphia County and includes the following areas:

- Ward 02 [PART, Divisions 01, 15, 16, 25, 26 and 27]
- Ward 05 [PART, Divisions 01, 02, 03, 04, 05, 10, 12, 13, 16, 17, 18, 19, 21, 24, 25, 26 and 27]
- Ward 18 [PART, Divisions 02, 04, 05, 06, 07, 10, 11, 12 and 17]
- Ward 25 [PART, Divisions 09, 13, 14, 15, 16, 17, 18, 19, 20, 21 and 24]
- Ward 31 [PART, Divisions 01, 02, 03, 04, 05, 07, 08, 09, 10, 11, 12, 13 and 14]

== Representatives ==
Representative	Party	Years	District home	Note
Prior to 1969, seats were apportioned by county.
John Pezak	Democrat	1969 – 1972		
Fortunato N. Perri	Republican	1973 – 1976	Philadelphia	Judge, Philadelphia Traffic Court
Robert A. Borski, Jr.	Democrat	1977 – 1982	Philadelphia	Elected to the U.S. House of Representatives
Gerard A. Kosinski	Democrat	1983 – 1992	Philadelphia	Judge, Philadelphia Municipal Court
Marie Lederer	Democrat	1993 – 2006		
Michael H. O'Brien	Democrat	2007 – 2018	Philadelphia	Representative O'Brien died in office on October 15, 2018, having already withdrawn from his re-election bid.
Mary Isaacson	Democrat	2019 – present		
