= Ralph Acosta =

American politician

Ralph D. Acosta

Member of the Pennsylvania House of Representatives from the 180th district
- In office January 1, 1985 – November 30, 1994
- Preceded by: James McIntyre
- Succeeded by: Benjamin Ramos

Personal details
- Born: September 28, 1934 (age 92) Sabana Grande, Puerto Rico
- Party: Democratic

Ralph D. Acosta (born September 28, 1934) is an American politician. He is a former Democratic member of the Pennsylvania House of Representatives. He was the first Latino to be elected to the state House.

== Background ==
Born in Sabana Grande, Puerto Rico on September 28, 1934, Acosta was professionally involved in long-haul trucking.

== Political career ==
A Democrat, he was elected to the Pennsylvania House of Representatives in 1985 as the state House's first Latino member. He served a total of five consecutive terms before loosing his bid for reelection 1995. During his tenure, Acosta co-chaired the Pennsylvania Governor's Advisory Commision on Latino Affairs,under Governor Robert P. Casey where he focused on securing safe and affordable housing for senior citizens.

Acosta was succeeded by Benjamin Ramos.
