= Harry R. J. Comer =

American politician

Member of the Pennsylvania House of Representatives from the 178th district
- In office 1969–1974
- Preceded by: District created
- Succeeded by: James M. McIntyre

Member of the Pennsylvania House of Representatives from the Philadelphia County district
- In office 1953–1968

Personal details
- Born: January 20, 1912 Philadelphia, Pennsylvania
- Died: March 15, 1990 (aged 78) Elkins Park, Pennsylvania
- Party: Democratic

Harry Robert Joseph Comer (January 20, 1912 – March 15, 1990) was a Democratic member of the Pennsylvania House of Representatives.

== Formative years ==
Harry Robert Joseph Comer was born in Philadelphia, Pennsylvania on January 20, 1912. During World War II, he served as a corporal with the U.S. Army. As an adult, he was employed as an insurance broker and real estate agent.

== Political career ==
A Democrat, he was appointed as the chair of Philadelphia's 33rd Ward Democratic Executive Committee. Elected to the Pennsylvania House of Representatives in 1953, he served 10 consecutive terms, during which time he represented Philadelphia County and was appointed to the Legislative Budget and Finance Committee (1963-1966) and the Pennsylvania Commission on Interstate Cooperation (1969-1974).

After failing in his run for reelection to the Pennsylvania House for its 1975 term, he served as the legislative liaison for the Pennsylvania National Guard from 1974 to 1978.

== Death and interment ==
Comer died in Elkins Park, Montgomery County, Pennsylvania on March 15, 1990, and was interred at the Resurrection Cemetery in Bensalem, Bucks County, Pennsylvania.
