= Jose Giral (Pennsylvania politician) =

American politician

Member of the Pennsylvania House of Representatives from the 180th district
- Incumbent
- Assumed office January 3, 2023
- Preceded by: Angel Cruz

Personal details
- Party: Democratic
- Education: William H. Maxwell Career and Technical Education High School
- Website: Official website

Jose Giral is a Democratic member of the Pennsylvania House of Representatives, representing the 180th District since 2023. In 2023 he sponsored H.B. 1548 “Establishing the Police and Community Safety Act” to prevent use of state policing resources for immigrant enforcement, and in 2025 he sponsored H.B. 2017, authorizing the Department of Environmental Protection to reduce annual fees for Small Modular Nuclear systems.

Political offices
Pennsylvania House of Representatives
Preceded by Angel Cruz	Member of the Pennsylvania House of Representatives from the 180th district 2023–present	Incumbent
