= Mary Isaacson =

Member of the Pennsylvania House of Representatives

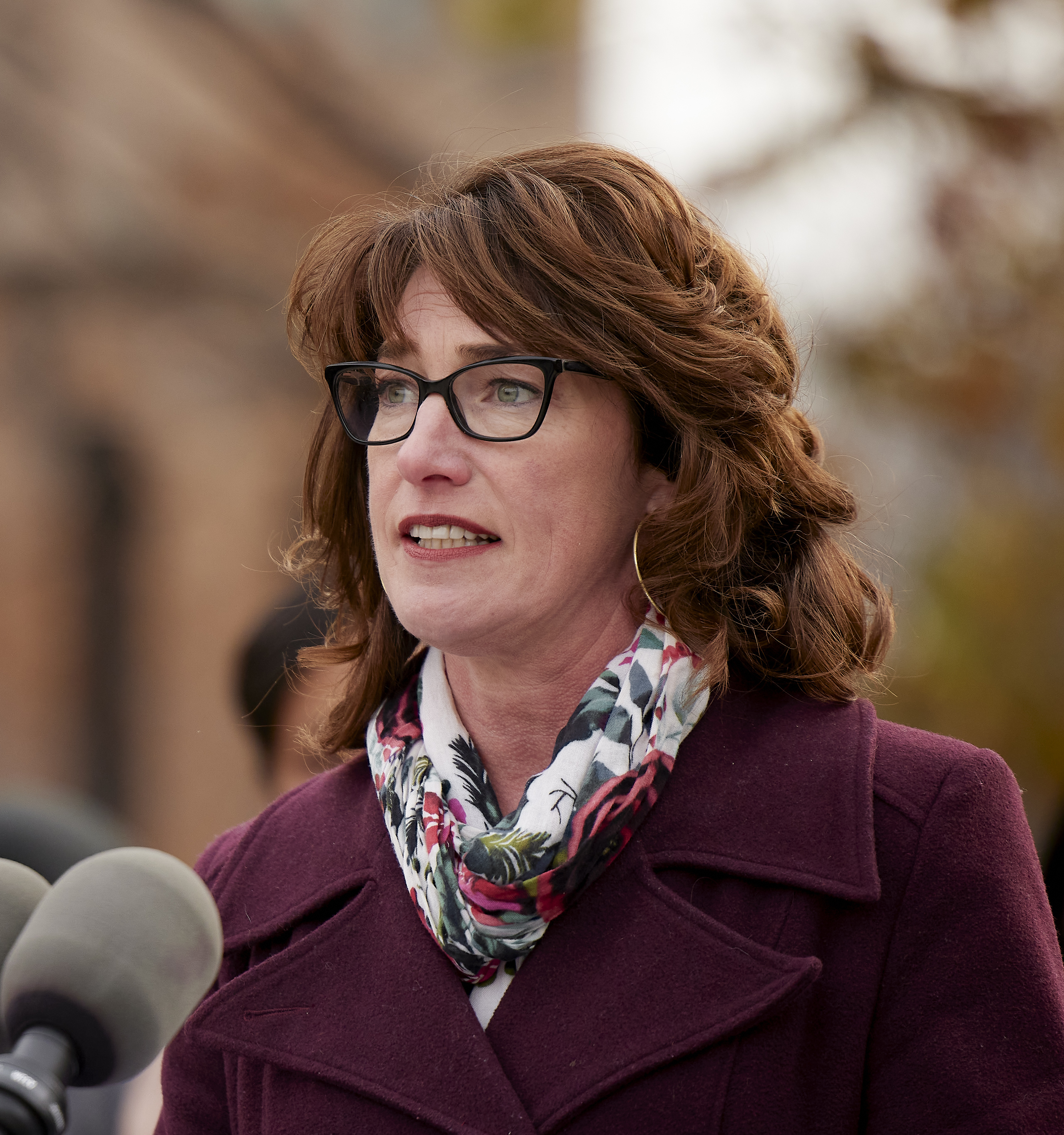

Member of the Pennsylvania House of Representatives from the 175th district
- Incumbent
- Assumed office January 1, 2019
- Preceded by: Michael H. O'Brien

Personal details
- Born: November 15, 1970 (age 55) Rockville Centre, New York, U.S.
- Party: Democratic
- Spouse: Chris
- Children: 2
- Education: Farmingdale State College (AS); State University of New York at Oneonta (BS)

MaryLouise Isaacson (born November 15, 1970) is an American politician serving as a member of the Pennsylvania House of Representatives from the 175th district since 2019.

== Early life and education ==
Isaacson was born on November 15, 1970, in Rockville Centre, New York. She graduated from Massapequin High School in 1988. In 1990, Isaacson received her Associate degree in early childhood development from State University of New York at Farmingdale. She earned a Bachelor of Science in political science from State University of New York at Oneonta in 1992.

== Political career ==
From 2006 to 2018, Isaacson served as chief of staff to Pennsylvania State Representative Michael H. O'Brien. At the same time, she served on the Democratic Committee of Philadelphia. Isaacson also served on the Democratic State Committee of Pennsylvania starting in 2010. Because of health issues, O'Brien filed paper work to remove his name from the 2018 general election ballot. Isaacson was chosen by the Philadelphia Democratic Committee to replace him. She won the general election that year and was reelected in 2020 and 2022.

== Personal life ==
Isaacson has two adult children. The family lives in the Northern Liberties neighborhood of Philadelphia

== Electoral history ==
2018 Pennsylvania House of Representatives election, District 175
Party	Candidate	Votes	%
Democratic	MaryLouise Isaacson	Unopposed	
Total votes		24,538	100.00

2020 Pennsylvania House of Representatives Democratic primary election, District 175
Party	Candidate	Votes	%
Democratic	MaryLouise Isaacson	5,361	37.36
Democratic	Vanessa McGrath	4,253	29.64
Democratic	Jeff Dempsey	2,943	20.51
Democratic	Andre del Valle	1,779	12.40
Write-in		14	0.10
Total votes		14,350	100.00

2020 Pennsylvania House of Representatives election, District 175
Party	Candidate	Votes	%
Democratic	MaryLouise Isaacson	30,233	99.05
Write-in		291	0.95
Total votes		30,524	100.00

2022 Pennsylvania House of Representatives election, District 175
Party	Candidate	Votes	%
Democratic	MaryLouise Isaacson	23,904	99.13
Write-in		211	0.87
Total votes		24,115	100.00
