= Genia Chef =

Russian artist living in Berlin, Germany

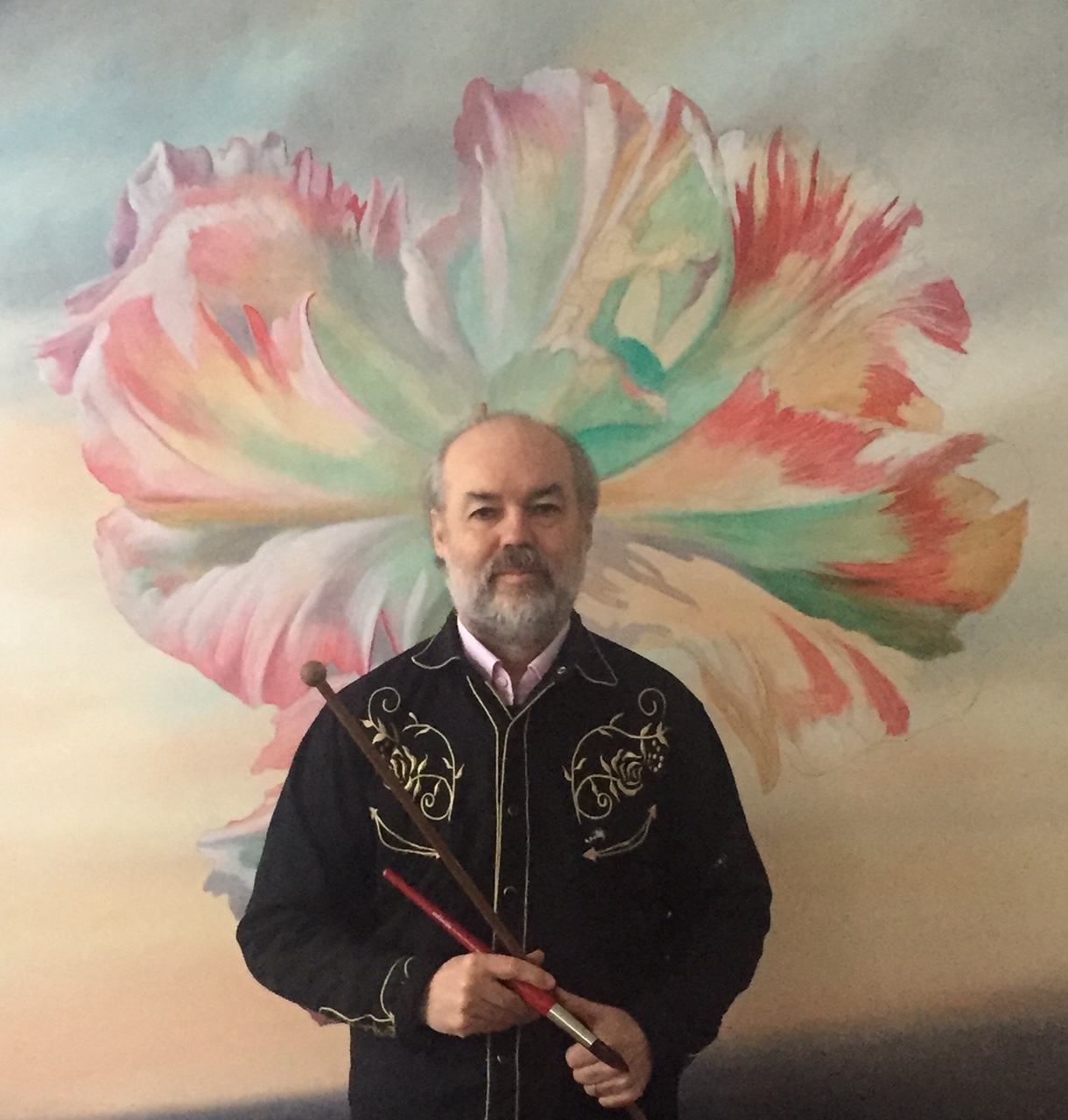
Genia Chef

Genia Chef (born Evgeny Scheffer, 28 January 1954) is a German-Russian artist (painting, graphic art, installations) living in Berlin. He is considered the founder of Post-Historicism, an art movement that combines elements of traditional painting with aesthetic experiments and interprets current events in the form of a new mythology. Germany.

== Biography ==
Genia Chef was born in 1954 in Aktjubinsk, Kazakhstan, as Evgeny Scheffer. His father, Vladimir Scheffer, was a photojournalist in Moscow. During the World War II he became a victim of Stalinist purges for political reasons and was banished to the Gulag in Kazakhstan. In 1961, five years after Nikita Khrushchev denounced Joseph Stalin's crimes in his Secret Speech at the Twentieth Party Congress, Vladimir Scheffer was granted permission for the family to return to Moscow. Chef then studied from 1967 to 1971 at the Art School for Children in Moscow. He was later a student from 1972 to 1977 at Moscow Polygraphic Institute, his professors were Andrei Dmitrijewitsch Gontscharow (graphic art) and Dmitri Dmitrijewitsch Zhilinski (painting). Genia Chef received first prize for his M.A. diploma for his illustrations to Edgar Allan Poe. In 1985 Chef moved to West Germany and by invitation of Rudolf Hausner, he studied at the Academy of Fine Arts Vienna, Austria from 1988 to 1993. His professor was Arik Brauer. In 1993 the Academy awarded him its Master of Fine Arts degree, together with its Fueger Gold Prize.

== Artistic career ==
During his studies, Genia Chef began working as an illustrator for the Soviet popular science magazine "Znanie-Sila", which provided a platform for nonconformist artists such as Yulo Sooster, who is considered a precursor of Moscow Conceptualism. Chief editor of the experimental magazine was Yuri Sobolev, a figure of the Moscow underground art scene and author of the animated films "Once upon a time there was a Kosyavin", "Butterfly" and "The Glass Harmonica". Evgeny Scheffer took the artist name Genia Chef when he began in the 1970s-80s to take part in exhibitions of the Moscow nonconformist artists in Malaya Gruzinskaya Street. Here he exhibited with artists like Viktor Pivovarov, Francisco Infante, Anatoly Zveryev, Andrei Roiter, Semyon Faibisovich and Konstantin Khudyakov. After studying at the Moscow Polygraphic Institute, Genia Chef lived mainly from book illustrations, as did other nonconformist artists in the USSR of the time (e.g. Ilya Kabakov, Oleg Vassiliev or Erik Bulatov). He illustrated numerous books, including E.A.Poe and American Romantic Tales. During this period his nonconformist painting was influenced by modern Western art movements. After moving to the Federal Republic of Germany in 1985, the artist devoted himself entirely to painting. He spent much time in the Spanish artists' village of Cadaqués, where he developed his post-historical style (Manifesto of Post-Historicism, 1996). At that time Genia Chef created works in which he staged familiar figures from Russian history such as Leo Tolstoy, Maxim Gorky or V.I.Lenin in landscapes of the Spanish Mediterranean coast. Often historical figures like Lenin, Stalin, Hitler, Mussolini are depoliticized and portrayed as extras in world history. On the occasion of an exhibition in the former studio of Antonio Canova in Rome, Genia Chef wrote his Manifesto of Neo-Mythology entitled "Viva Canova! (1995). The mixture of post-historical and neo-mythological concepts characterizes his work of this period ( ex."The Birth of Myths", 1993). A comprehensive solo exhibition at the State Russian Museum in St. Petersburg entitled "Glory of a New Century" in 2011 presents numerous key works from both creative periods. In 2013, Genia Chef is represented in the Official Programme of the 55th Venice Biennale (Palazzo Bembo, Collateral Events) with the multimedia installation "Dead House". Here, the artist thematizes the murder of the Russian Tsar's family, which remains an important aspect of his work (several museum exhibitions in Russia, 2017-2019). In 2015, Genia Chef and his friend, the writer Vladimir Sorokin, show the project "Pavilion Telluria" during the 56th Venice Biennale in Palazzo Rocca Contarini Corfù. Genia Chef's "Archive of Transitional Conditions" consists of more than 200 small-format works that form a kind of visual diary. In their performance on the occasion of the exhibition opening, both artists compete against each other: Genia Chef as knight with lance and shield, Vladimir Sorokin as Neanderthal with notebook and wooden stick. The confrontation symbolizes the clash of different historical epochs. In more recent times Genia Chef has been interested in the idea of the "New Renaissance Man", the creator who forms a symbiosis of scientist and artist. Inspired by the research of the Russian academician Vladimir Skulachev on "Life without Aging", Genia Chef and Skulachev's son Maxim have developed the concept of an "Academy of Immortality".

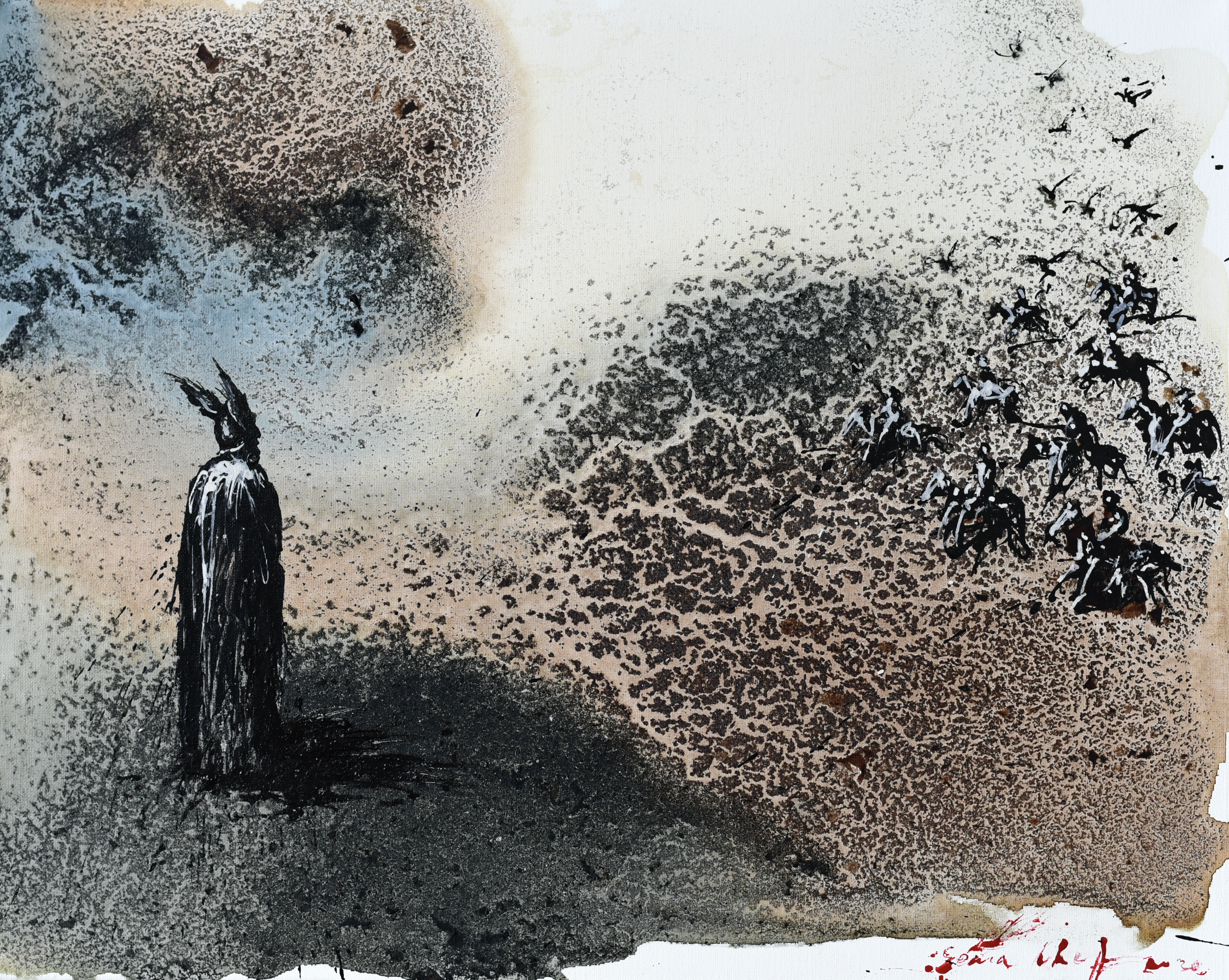
Exhibition project Nibelungenlied by Genia Chef

== Exhibitions (selection) ==
- 1976: First Exhibition of the Avantgard Artists. Gorkom of Graphic Artists, Malaya Gruzinskaya, Moscow
- 1976-85: Exhibitions of the Nonconformist Artists, Moscow
- 1987: Don Quijote. Municipal Museum Olot, Spain
- 1988: Triennale. Municipal Museum Ulm, Germany
- 1989: Galeria Maria Salvat, Barcelona, Spain (solo show)
- 1991: House of Latin America, Monte Carlo, Monaco solo show (Patronage of Prince Louis de Polignac)
- 1993: Monumental Propaganda. (Curators Komar und Melamid), World Financial Center, New York
- 1994: Old Symbols, New Icons in Russian Contemporary Art. Stuart Levy Fine Art, New York, USA; Ideal Landscapes: Artists from the Former Soviet Union. de Saisset Museum, Santa Clara/California, USA
- 1994-95: Neo-Mythology and Regressive Projects. Stuart Levy Fine Art, New York (solo show)
- 1997: Promenaden in Arkadien. Italian Cultural Institute, Berlin (solo show)
- 1998: Neo-Academism and Electronic Art. New Academy, St. Petersburg, Russia
- 1998-99: It's the Real Thing: Soviet and Post-Soviet Sots Art and American Pop Art. Weisman Art Museum, Minneapolis, USA
- 1999: Play and Passion. Staatl. Russisches Museum, St.Petersburg
- 1999: A 25 Year Retrosp ective on Non-Conformist Russian Art. Kolodzei Art Foundation, Kennan Institute, Washington, D.C., USA
- 2000: The Hurricane of Time: Art of the 1960s through 2000. Kolodzei Art Foundation, Villa Ormond, San Remo, Italy; L’Age d’Or. Museum-Center Luis Buñuel, Calanda, Spain
- 2000-2001: Jesus Christ in Christian Art and Culture 14th to 20th Centuries. State Russian Museum, St.Petersburg and Monasterio di Santa Chiara, San Marino
- 2001: Between Earth and Heaven. P.M.M.K Museum of Modern Art, Ostende, Belgium
- 2001: The Sum is Greater Than t he Parts: Collage & Assemblage in the Norton and Nancy Dodge Collection of Nonconformist Art from the Sov iet Union. Zimmerli Art Museum, Rutgers University, New Brunswick, USA
- 2002: Shock and Show. Festival of International Contemporary Art, Trieste, Italy
- 2002: Artists of the Ideal.Palazzo Forti, Verona, Italy
- 2003: Remembrance: Russian Post-Modern Nostalgia. Yeshiva University Museum, New York
- 2003: Foreign Visions. Stiftung Starke, Berlin and Museum of Contemporary Art, Skopje, Northern Macedonia (solo show); M°A°I°S V. Paradies, Bunker under Alexanderplatz, Berlin
- 2004: HA KYPOPT! Russische Kunst Heute! Kunsthalle Baden-Baden, Germany and Novy Manezh, Moscow
- 2004: Gods Becoming Men. Frissiras Museu m, Athens, Greece; Danses de la Mort. White Space Gallery, London (solo show)
- 2005: Glory of a New Century. Experimental Art Foundation, Adelaide, Australia (solo show);Western Biennale. John Natsoulas Art Center, Davis/California, USA; Finding Freedom: 40 Years of Soviet and Russian Art. Kolodzei Art Foundation, Leepa-Rattner Museum of Art, Tarpon Springs, USA
- 2006: Times of Change. The Art of 1960-85 in the Soviet Union. State Russian Museum, St.Petersburg
- 2006: Meditazione sulla Realta. Palazzo della Ragione, Mantova, Italy
- 2007: I Believe. II Moscow Biennale, Installation "My Personal Temple". Vinsavod, Moscow
- 2008: Power of Water. State Russian Museum, St.Petersburg
- 2009: Born in the USSR - Russian Art from Germany. Ministry of Foreign Affairs, Berlin
- 2010: Shattered Utopia. Russian Art of the Soviet and Post-Soviet Periods from the Wayne F.Yakes, M.D.Collection. Fort Collins Museum of Art, USA
- 2010: The S ky in Art. State Russian Museum, St.Petersburg
- 2011: Glory of a New Century. State Russian Museum, St.Petersburg (solo show)
- 2011: Point s of View. Art Museum, Boulder, USA
- 2013: Installation Dead House, part of Personal Structures. Palazzo Bembo, Collateral Events, 55th Venice Biennale
- Russisches Berlin, as part of the Festival White Nights, Ce ntral Exhibition Hall, Perm, Russia
- 2014: Genia Chef, Ilya Kabakov, Oleg Vassiliev. The Blinding Light of History. University of New Mexico Art Museum, Albuquerque, USA
- 2015: Pavillon Telluria (in cooperation witt Wladimir Sorokin), Palazzo Rocca Contarini Corfu, during the 56th Venice Biennale
- 2017: Installation "Desintegration of the Black Square". APS Mdina Cathedral Contemporary Art Biennale, Malta
- 2018-2019: Family Album, Museum of Fine Arts Kaluga, Russia and later travelling exhibition through museums of the Moscow region (solo show)
- 2019: Masters of Russian Realism: Oleg Vassiliev - Genia Chef - Komar and Melamid. Columbus State University, Georgia, USA
- 2019/2020: On the Edge of the World. State Art Museum Novosibirsk, Russia (solo show)
- 2020: Academy of Immortality, as part of the travelling exhibition ART-PROJECT 2020-2070, Museum of Architecture, Moscow
- 2021/22: NIBELUNGENLIED, SiegfriedMuseum, Xanten, Germany, Castle Drachenburg, Königswinter; Neues Museum, Schloss Sayn, Bendorf; Castle Pfalzgrafenstein Kaub am Rhein; Museum Heylshof, Nibelungenmuseum, Das WORMSER, Worms; Harburg Castle, Harburg; Kulturmodell Passau; Palais Palffy, Wien; Nationalmuseum Burg Esztergom, Hungary
- 2023: Installation EVAPhrodite (Original Sin), APS Mdina Cathedral Contemporary Art Biennale, Malta
- 2024: The Body Implied: The Vanishing Figure in Soviet Art, Zimmerli Art Museum, New Brunswick, USA
- 2025: Romanovs - The New Orthodox Martyr Saints - The Romanovs, Mdina Cathedral Museum, Mdina, Malta
- 2026: ¡Viva Don Quijote!, MEAM (Museu Europeu d’Art Modern), Barcelona, Spanien

== Book Illustrations ==
- Illustrations in the monthly Avantgarde magazine „Znanie-sila“, Moscow, 1976–1981
- Mihail Eminescu, Luceafarul, Detskaya Literatura, Moscow, 1979
- K.K.Sluchevsky, Poetry, Detskaya Literatura, Moscow, 1983
- Vil Lipatov, The Stoletov Dossier, Raduga, Moscow 1983
- E.A.Poe, Prose and Poetry, Raduga, Moscow, 1983
- Vsevolod Garshin, Amapola Roja, Raduga, Moscow, 1984
- American Romantic Tales, Raduga, Moscow, 1984
- Erich Kästner, Ausgewählte Prosa u. Gedichte, Raduga, Moscow, 1985 (book cover)
- Alexander Genis, USA From A to Z, Uralskij Universitet Publ., Ekaterinburg, 1997
- Mikhail Epstein, Aleksandr Genis, Russian Postmodernism: New Perspectives on Post-Soviet Culture, Berghahn Books, 1999
- Michael Lederer, Nothing Lasts Forever Anymore, Parsifal Ediciones, Barcelona 1999 (book cover and illustrations), ISBN 978-84-87265-99-0
- Wiktor Pelewin, Buddha's Little Finger, Penguin, NY, 2000 and Mondadori, Milano (book cover)
- Richard Faber, Das ewige Rom oder: die Stadt und der Erdkreis. Zur Archäologie "abendländischer" Globalisierung, Verlag Koenigshausen Neumann, 2001 (book cover), ISBN 978-3-8260-2034-6.
- Michael Lederer, The Great Game, PalmArt Press, Berlin 2012,ISBN 978-3-941524-12-5 (book cover).
- Michael Lederer, Cadaqués, Parsifal Ediciones, Barcelona 2014 (book cover)

== Bibliography ==
- Chef, Genia; Vollkommer, Rainer (2020). Nibelungenlied (in German). Berlin. ISBN 978-3-945867-36-5. OCLC 1244019905.
- R.Santos Torroella, Genia Chef y la perestroika, ABC, Madrid, 6/1989
- F. Miralles, Genia Chef, voluntad moralizante y estetica, La Vanguardia, Barcelona, 6/1989
- L.Prudovsky, Genia Chef – Manierist i Kosmopolit, Ogonyok, 13/1992
- Constantin Boym, Regressive Design, Metropolis, NY, 5/1993
- В.Завалишин, Сумерки лжепророка, Русская Жизнь, Сан Франсиско, 5/1994
- Н.Козлова, От революции к эротике, Новое Русское Слово, Нью-Йорк, 7/1994
- А.Генис, Третий Рим Жени Шефа, Панорама, Нью-Йорк, 1/1995
- J.Croghan, Realistic Painting in An Imaginary Landscape, American Artist,12/1995
- В.Моев, Упразднитель времени. Женя Шеф о себе, о кризисе авангардизма и о новом Ренессансе, Литературная Газета, Москва, 11/1998
- J.M.Cadena, Las revoluciones olvidadas de Genia Chef, El Periodico, Barcelona, 6/1999
- F.Miralles, Imaginativo Genia Chef – las dictaturas, la historiay el ordenador, La Vanguardia, Barcelona, 7/1999
- The International Who's Who 2000, Europa Publ., London ISBN 1-85743-050-6, Library of Congress Catalog Card number 35-10257
- Edward Lucie-Smith, The Glory of Angels, Harper Design Pub., London, 2000, ISBN 0061787779
- Edward Lucie-Smith, Art Tomorrow, Terrail ed., Paris, 2002 ISBN 9782879392493
- Edward Lucie-Smith, Visions of Hellfire, Critic's Diary, London, ArtReview, September 2002
- Blumen aus Niemandsland, hrsg. von Präsident des Abgeordnetenhauses Berlin, Berlin 2003
- M°A°I°S 5 – Paradies (Ausstellungskatalog), hrsg. von Torsten und Nina Römer, Berlin 2004, ISBN 3-00-013874-9.
- HA KYPOPT! Russische Kunst Heute, hrsg. von Mathias Winzen und Georgy Nikitsch, Wienand Verlag, Köln 2004, ISBN 3-87909-835-2
- Lexikon der phantastischen Künstler. Hrsg. Gerhard Habarta, Wien, 2010 ISBN 978-3848263073
- Genia Chef, Glory of a New Century, Palace Ed., St.Petersburg, 2011,ISBN 978-3-86384-054-9 (Katalog zur Ausstellung im Russischen Museum St. Petersburg)
- Genia Chef, On the Edge of the World, Novosibirsk, 2019
- Стародубцева З.Б. Русские художники за рубежом. 1970-2010-е годы, изд. БуксМАрт, Москва, 2020 ISBN 978-5-907043-69-5
