= Miles W. Lederer =

American politician

Member of the Pennsylvania House of Representatives
- In office 1949–1953

Personal details
- Born: Miles William Lederer; December 30, 1897 Philadelphia, Pennsylvania
- Died: December 25, 1953 (aged 55) Philadelphia, Pennsylvania
- Party: Democratic
- Spouse: Susan Scullin

Military service
- Allegiance: United States
- Branch/service: United States Army
- Battles/wars: World War I

Miles William Lederer (December 30, 1897 – December 25, 1953) was an American politician.

Lederer was born in Philadelphia, Pennsylvania and went to Northeast High School in Philadelphia. He served in the United States Army during World War I. Lederer worked in the office of the Pennsylvania Auditor General as an auditor and an investigator. He was involved with the Democratic Party. Lederer served in the Pennsylvania House of Representatives from 1949 until his death. His sons Raymond and William also served in the Pennsylvania General Assembly. His daughter-in-law Marie also served in the Pennsylvania General Assembly.
