= Ivo John Lederer =

American historian

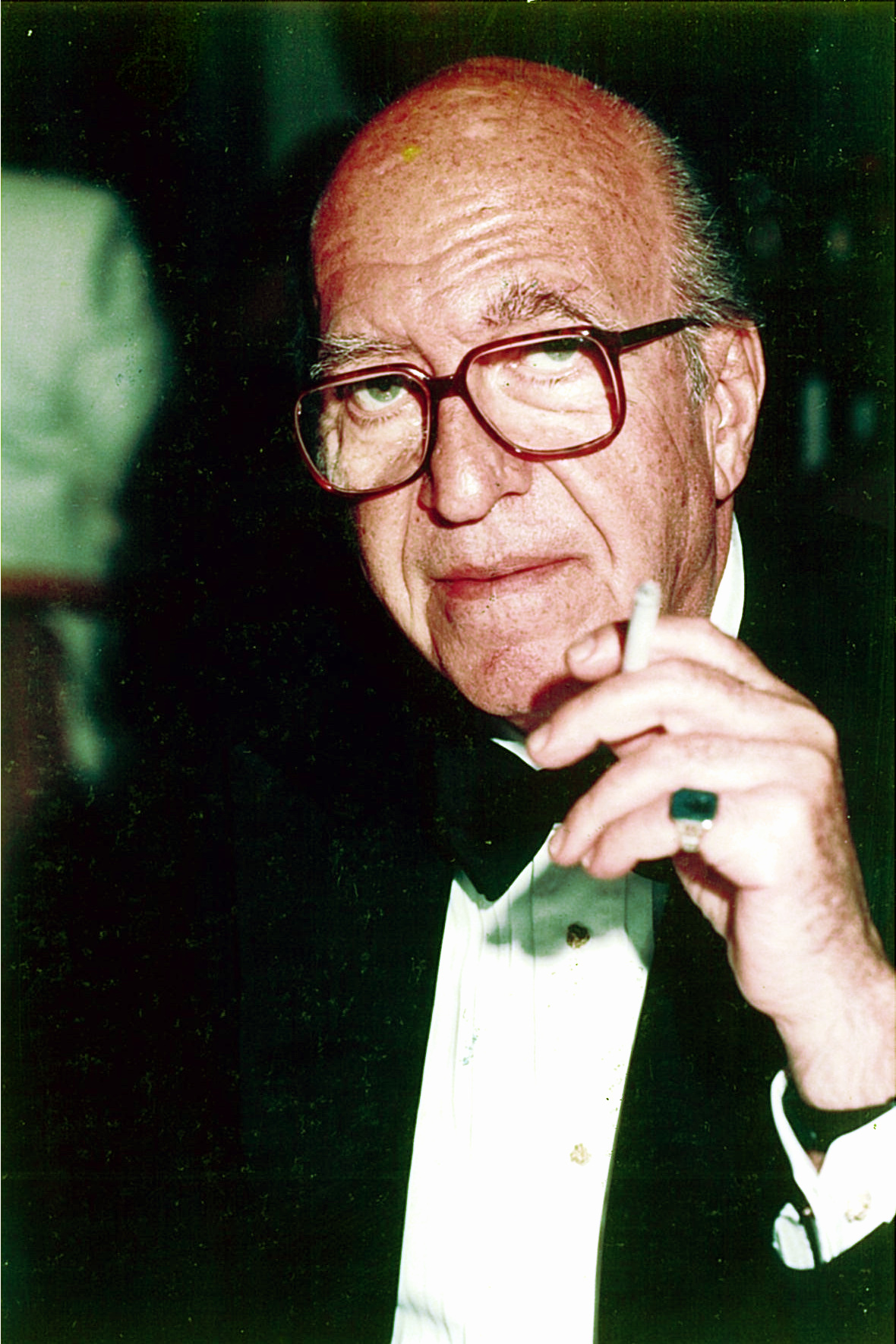
Ivo John Lederer

Ivo John Lederer (December 11, 1929 – June 18, 1998) was a diplomatic historian who taught at Princeton (1955–57), Yale (1957–65) and Stanford (1965–77) universities. He also served at the Ford Foundation in New York City as Program Officer in charge of East European affairs. In 1977, he left academics to begin a second career in business.

== Early life ==
Ivo John Lederer was born in Zagreb, Yugoslavia, into a Jewish family. In 1941 Lederer's family fled from the Nazis to Italy. After three years in hiding there, the family gained passage to the United States aboard the Liberty Ship U.S.S. Henry Gibbins. Soon after their arrival, the group was transported to a refugee center in Oswego, New York. They expected to be sent back to Europe at the end of the war, however in 1945 President Harry Truman signed special legislation allowing the refugees to remain in the United States, becoming citizens.

The story of these refugees is told in the book Haven, The Unknown Story of 1,000 World War II Refugees by Ruth Gruber (New York: Putnam, 1983). In 2001, the book was also made into a film starring Natasha Richardson, Hal Holbrook and Anne Bancroft which aired on CBS in 2001. Today, the voyage and experiences of that band of refugees is chronicled by the Safe Haven Museum in Oswego, New York. A filmed interview with Dr. Lederer about that refugee experience is included on the website of the United States Holocaust Memorial Museum.

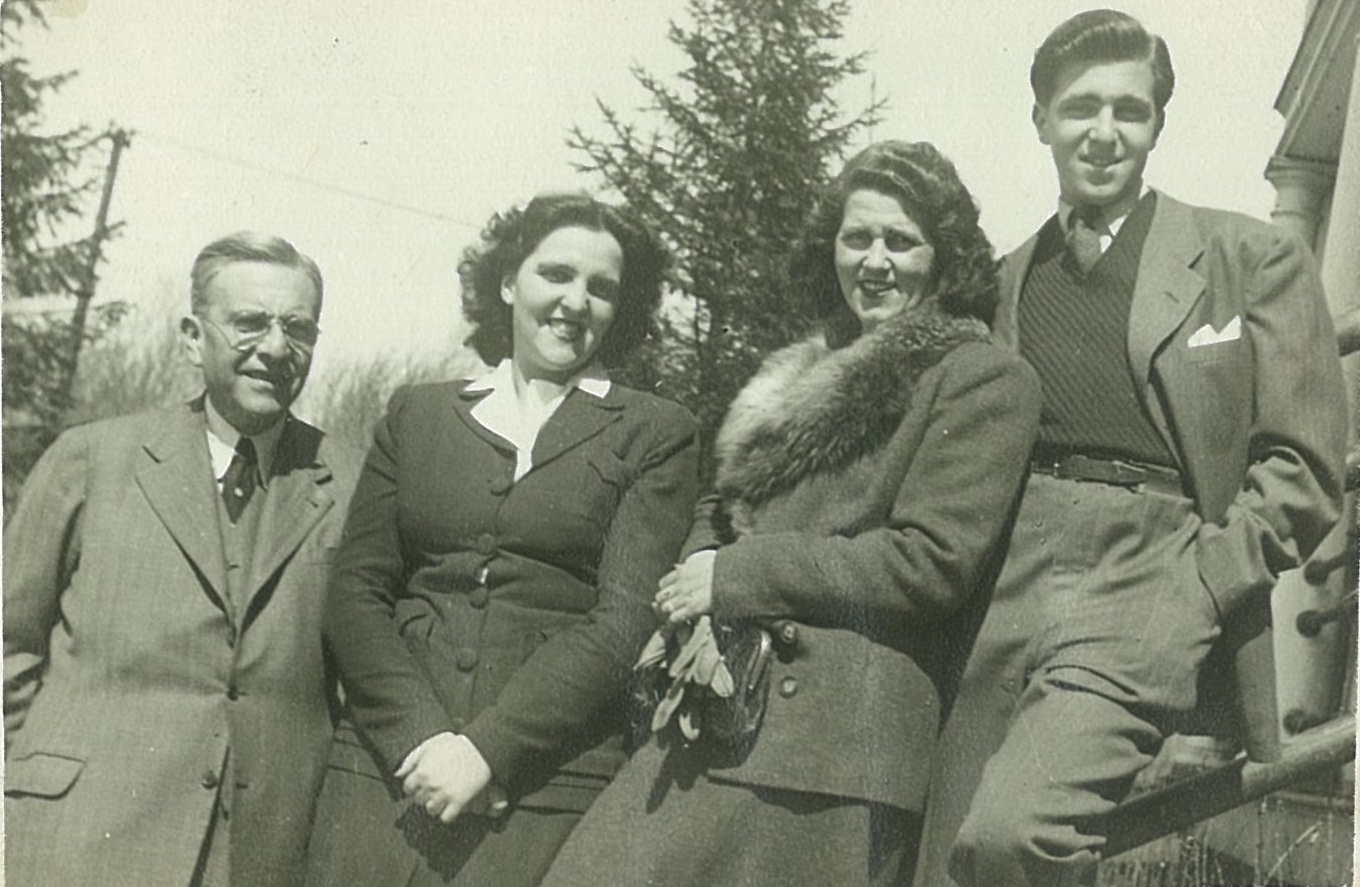
Ivo Lederer with his sister Mira, parents Otto and Ruza, Oswego, NY, 1945

International Who's Who notes that after studying 1947–48 at City College of New York, Lederer earned his B.A. in history at the University of Colorado, Boulder, 1951. He then studied 1951–52 at the University of Virginia before earning his master's degree, 1954, and Ph.D., 1957, in Contemporary Diplomatic History at the Woodrow Wilson School of Public and International Affairs at Princeton.

== Career ==
Dr. Lederer wrote or edited a variety of books and articles, including Yugoslavia at the Paris Peace Conference (New Haven and London: Yale University Press, 1963) which won the 1964 George Louis Beer Prize from the American Historical Association. On June 4, 1994, to mark the 50th anniversary of the Allies' liberation of Rome, Dr. Lederer wrote an article for the New York Times recalling his memories of that day as a Jewish refugee hiding in that city. On December 17, 1995, following conclusion of the Dayton Accords on former Yugoslavia, he wrote an article for The Washington Post entitled Bosnia: Precedents of Peace in which he stressed his view that stability in southeastern Europe was very much "in the American national interest."

Lederer's students included many future leaders, among them Timothy Wirth, U.S. Senator from Colorado and later President of the United Nations Foundation; Strobe Talbott, Deputy Secretary of Defense under Bill Clinton and President of the Brookings Institution; and Fred Smith, CEO of Federal Express.

Dr. Lederer was a member of the Council on Foreign Relations in New York, the American Historical Association, and a Senior Fellow of the Research Institute on International Change at Columbia University. In 1995 he was made a Trustee of the Toynbee Prize Foundation. In January 1998 he was voted a Member of the International Institute for Strategic Studies (IISS) in London.

In May 1998, one month before his death, he won the United Nations Society of Writers Award for his "great contributions to the worlds of history, politics and literature."

Lederer's New York Times obituary described his later career as dedicated to "bringing government and business leaders together to discuss the interaction of foreign and business policies." James Schlesinger, former U.S. Secretary of Defense and Energy and Director of Central Intelligence, quoted in the New York Times obit., called Lederer a "master at policy dialogue, knowing how best to identify and orchestrate a multiplicity of views to advance understanding" .

Lederer spoke English, Italian, Croatian, German, French and Russian.

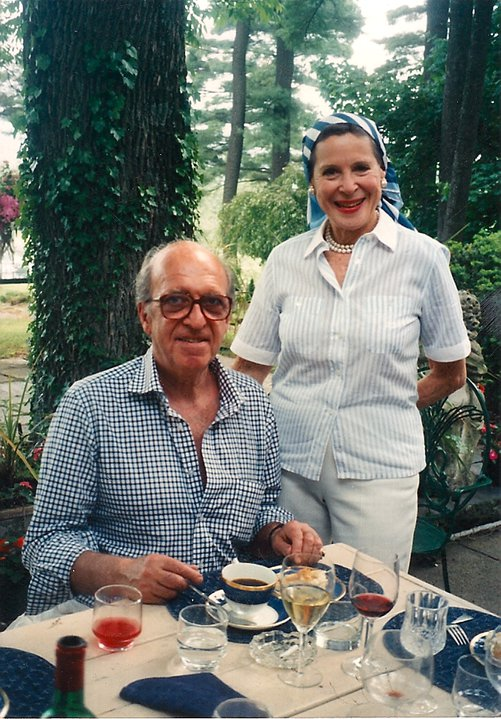
Ivo John Lederer with Kitty Carlisle Hart in Great Barrington, Massachusetts, 1995.

== Personal life ==
Lederer's first marriage to Johanna Lederer (1930–2007) ended in divorce in 1965. They had two sons, Michael (Michael Lederer), born 1956, and Philip, born 1959. In later years, Lederer was the long-time partner of Kitty Carlisle Hart. Their relationship lasted for 16 years until his death.
