= Michael Lederer =

American poet

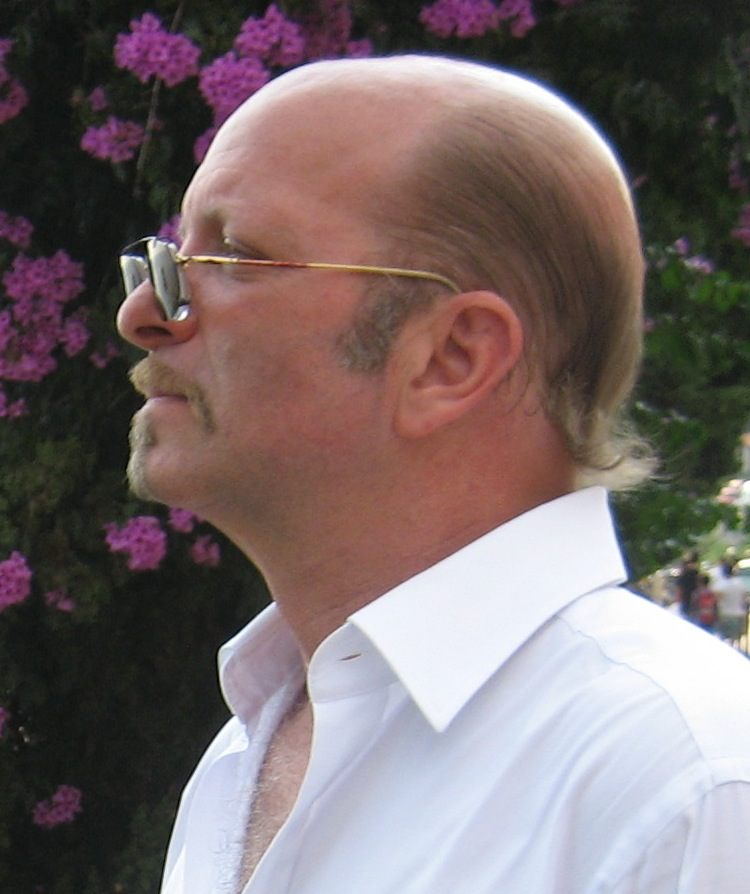
- Born: July 9, 1956 (age 70); Princeton, New Jersey, U.S.
- Occupation: Writer

Michael Lederer (born July 9, 1956, in Princeton, New Jersey) is an American playwright, screenwriter, novelist, short story writer, poet, and essayist currently living in Berlin, Germany. Die Welt has called him "an archaeologist among the great American writers."

== Biography ==
=== Early life ===
Michael Lederer was born in Princeton, New Jersey, where his father Ivo Lederer taught contemporary Russian and East European diplomatic history at Princeton University. His father was a native of what is now Croatia. In 1957 the family moved to New Haven, Connecticut.

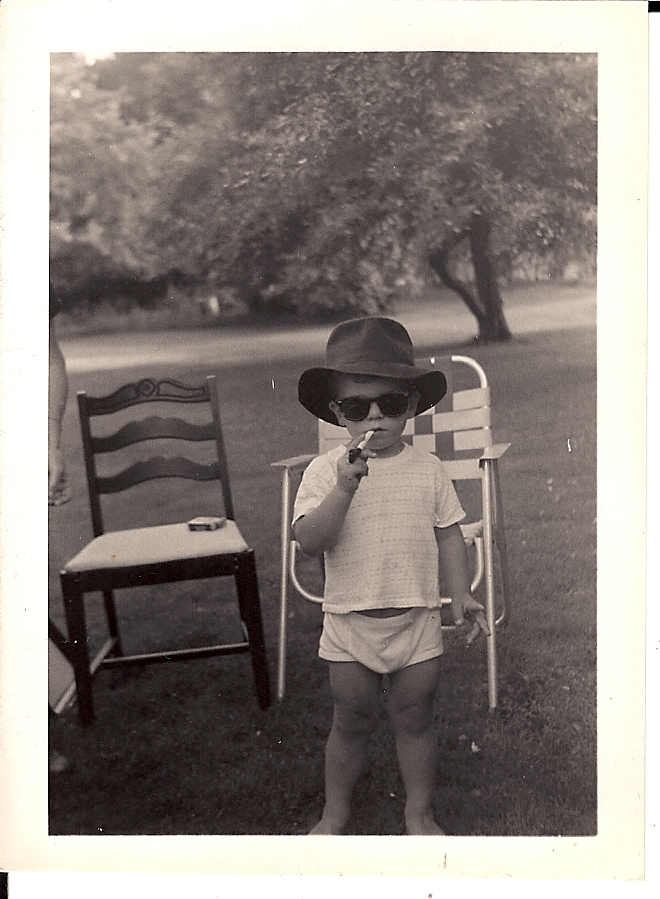
Michael Lederer 1958 in New Haven, Connecticut.

In 1965 they moved again to Palo Alto, California. Six months later the parents divorced. Lederer attended Palo Alto schools, graduating from Henry M. Gunn High School in 1974. At age 12, Lederer joined the American Federation of Television and Radio Artists (AFTRA) to work as a child actor in San Francisco. In 1972 he played Gandalf in a production of The Hobbit at Palo Alto Children's Theatre. The role of Smaug the dragon was played by future best-selling fantasy author Tad Williams.

In the mid-seventies, Lederer lived in a tipi on a hippie commune called The Land in the Santa Cruz Mountains of California. The community was founded by Joan Baez and her then-husband David Harris as the Institute for the Study of Non-Violence. An extensive interview with Lederer about his time on The Land can be found on The Land website. Asked about the experience by SFGATE in 2023, he replied "Living at The Land was about seeing commonalities between ways of thinking. Why are we here? How does one live a good and true life? What is our position in a bigger universe? How do we treat others? Those questions brought many of us up that mountain.”

In 1981, Lederer received a B.A. in Theatre Arts from Binghamton University in New York. Lederer was an original acting member of Tony Award-winning TheatreWorks in Palo Alto. Roles there included Lucullus in Brecht's The Trial of Lucullus, Cyrano in Cyrano de Bergerac, Prince Serpuhovsky in Tolstoy's Strider, and Sigmund Freud in Fraulein Dora. In 1989, Lederer played Claudius in a touring production of Hamlet in London and Hong Kong. During that year in London he helped break the news of the discovery of The Rose Theatre, the first Elizabethan era theatre ever unearthed. After stumbling upon the archeological dig on London's South Bank, he alerted The London Evening Standard, making the first public call to save the ruins of The Rose from destruction by real estate developers.

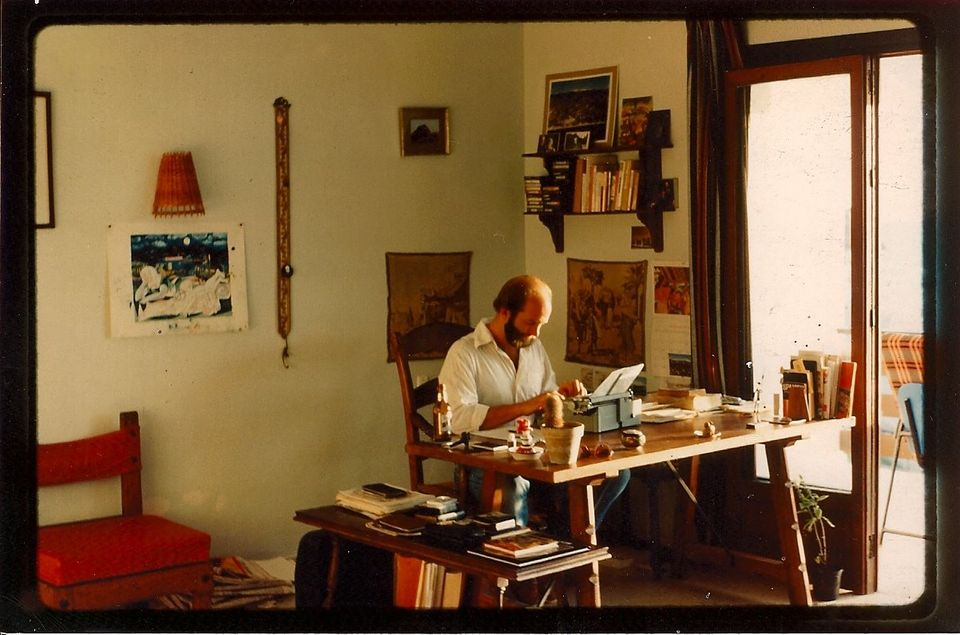
Michael Lederer 1984 in La Herradura, Andalusia, Spain.

=== Career ===
In 1984–85, Lederer and his first wife Judy were living in La Herradura, a fishing village in the south of Spain. In a 2014 interview, Lederer told Deutsche Welle television "I was drunk and stoned one night, climbing up the balconies to our apartment, and I fell from the fourth story down to the parking lot." While recovering with a broken leg in Granada's Hospital Clinico de San Cecilio, he began work on a novella. It is the story of a family that must decide whether to sell their small farm to real estate developers. "Nothing Lasts Forever Anymore" was published in 1999 in Barcelona and Cadaqués by a small publishing house called Parsifal Ediciones as "Ya Nada Dura Eternamente." In 2001, the Catalan writer David Marti, reviewing the book in the French literary journal "Remanences," wrote "No one as yet has been able, like Michael Lederer, to engender the calmness of our life and dreams on the shores of the frail yet powerful Mediterranean Sea." In March 2013, a revised edition of "Nothing Lasts Forever Anymore" was published in both English and German by PalmArt Press in Berlin and presented at the Leipzig Book Fair. The German title is "Nichts ist mehr für die Ewigheit."

In 1998, Lederer co-founded the Safe Haven Museum in Oswego, New York. The museum chronicles the voyage of the only group of Jewish refugees admitted into the United States from Europe during World War II. The 982 refugees included Lederer's father, who had been born in Zagreb, Yugoslavia, as well as his aunt and grandparents. Upon arriving by ship in New York harbor, the refugees were immediately interned in a refugee camp at what is now the site of the museum. The story of those 982 refugees is told in the 2001 movie "Haven" starring Natasha Richardson and Hal Holbrook. The story is also explored in Lederer's own stage play "Casual Baggage".

In 1997–1999, Lederer founded the 17th century Sir George Downing manuscript collection at Harvard University.

In 2000, Lederer co-wrote and co-starred in the art film "Las Venice" which was shot both in Venice, Italy, and at the Venetian hotel in Las Vegas. The two settings were intermixed in an aim to "blur the distinction between the real, the plastic, and real plastic." Narrating the film's end, Lederer predicts an artificial plasticized reality spreading "until eventually Atlantic City in New Jersey and Las Vegas in Nevada will grow and grow until finally, if they have their way, the two will meet and the entire country will become one commercial theme park." Bending over a bed of artificial flowers at the Venetian, he notes, "I love the smell of plastic."

From 2015 to 2023, he has contributed a series of articles to the American Studies Journal Blog.

In December 2016, writing for Politico Magazine, Lederer responded to the Christmas market attack in Berlin.

=== "Casual Baggage" ===
In January 2023, in commemoration of International Holocaust Remembrance Day, the U.S. embassy in Berlin presented a staged reading of Lederer's play "Casual Baggage" at the English Theatre Berlin International Performing Arts Center.

The play is based on the true story of a small group of Jewish refugees admitted into America during WWII. Brought from Naples to New York on a single ship, the USNS Henry Gibbins (T-AP-183), and numbering only 982, they were kept behind barbed wire in an internment camp in Oswego, New York until the war's end. That group included Lederer's father Ivo Lederer, his aunt Mira and his grandparents Otto and Ruza. In a filmed embassy interview with the U.S. Cultural Attaché, Lederer said, "The real power of this story is not in what was done for the 982, but in what was not done for all the others so desperate for safe haven." Oswego's Palladium Times newspaper, writing about the play, noted the reading at English Theatre Berlin would include a filmed discussion with Lederer. In that discussion, Lederer explained the play's title. "As they were not immigrants and had no legal status, the refugees including my dad were forced to wear cardboard tags on strings around their necks identifying them as 'U.S. Military Casual Baggage.' As if they were things, not people. Not the first time in U.S. history that had happened."

In an essay "America and the Holocaust" published November 2022 in the American Studies Journal Blog, American-born Lederer writes of how difficult it is for his own also his children's generations "growing and living in relative safety" to grasp what it is like to suffer the horrors of war, and prejudice. He notes, "We don't study history to understand the past. We study it to understand today, and prepare for tomorrow." He adds, "To love hate. A little design flaw there."

In February 2025, the U.S. State Department purged thousands of its own webpages that had been promoting diversity, equity, inclusion (DEI). Also, many containing discussions of refugee issues. The U.S. Embassy page describing "Casual Baggage" was among those purged.

=== Dubrovnik Shakespeare Festival ===
In 2009, Lederer founded the Dubrovnik Shakespeare Festival in Dubrovnik, Croatia. Aimed to promote Dubrovnik at home and abroad, DSF's first touring production was Lederer's own play "Mundo Overloadus". "Mundo Overloadus" was also staged in 2010 at Performance Space 122 in New York's East Village. In "Beating the Global Odds", Paul A. Laudicina summarizes and cites Lederer's play, saying "Imagine having at last the entire knowledge of human civilization at your fingertips, and finding that it basically gives you a migraine. Michael Lederer, an American writer who lives in Berlin and Dubrovnik, Croatia, calls this Mundo Overloadus – the title of his recent play that premiered in New York."

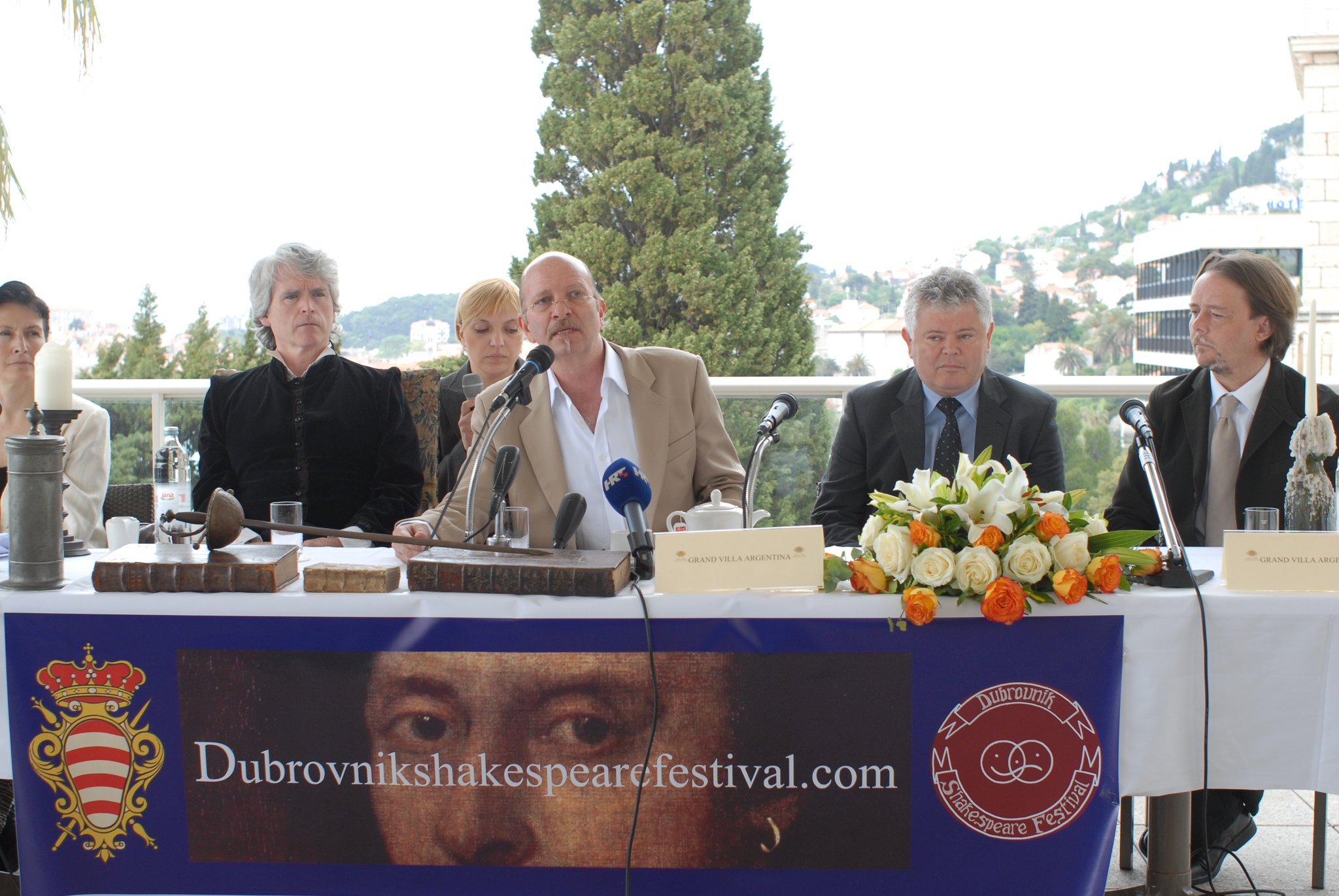
Dubrovnik Shakespeare Festival press conference with Michael Lederer and Dubrovnik mayor Andro Vlahušić, 2011..

Croatian President (and composer) Ivo Josipovic, director Irina Brook, and the artist Genia Chef were among those artists helping launch Dubrovnik Shakespeare Festival. DSF also runs a museum program in conjunction with the Marin Drzic Museum of Dubrovnik. Lederer served as artistic director of DSF 2009–2013.

In a March 2024 interview with the magazine Kulturring Berlin, Lederer described in detail political struggles that befell the Festival as it eventually led a campaign against mass tourism. "Only 800 Croatian citizens remained living within the old walls, most homes sold off to foreigners. While as many as five cruise ships a day, each disgorging as many as 3,000 short term visitors, swell the town with invading hordes. The Disneyfication of one of the most beautiful manmade corners of the globe. That is, if you can spot it through all the bobbing heads of picture-taking tour groups."

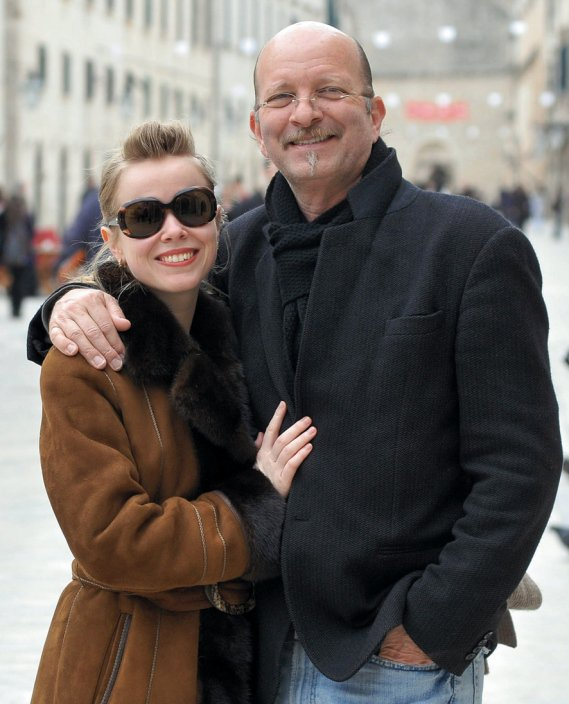
Michael Lederer and his wife Katarina in Dubrovnik, Croatia, 2013.

=== "The Great Game" ===
"The Great Game Berlin-Warsaw Express and Other Stories", a collection of Lederer's short stories and sonnets, was published in Berlin in 2012 by PalmArt Press in both English and German. The book premiered at the Leipzig Book Fair. Reviewing it, the newspaper Berliner Morgenpost called The Great Game "Wonderfully ironic…a brilliant chronicle of loss, showing us characters who have fallen through the cracks of our increasingly interconnected world." Die Welt wrote: "In these stories, great dramas and great comedies play out, and as in Shakespeare's King Lear 'The worst returns to laughter.' These are fascinating excavations. Michael Lederer is a true archaeologist, among the great American writers."

The American playwright John Guare, in reference to The Great Game, wrote that "Michael Lederer writes with the intensity of an ancient soul sitting around the campfire spinning ardent tale after tale to warm the winter night. A real treat." The Russian novelist Vladimir Sorokin commented that "In the stories of Michael Lederer, it is as if the author deliberately and thoroughly erected a fine building, and then a ruthless movement destroyed it in front of you. These ruins are fascinating."

=== "Cadaqués" ===
In February 2014, Berlin's PalmArt Press published Lederer's first full-length novel, "Cadaqués". It is the story of a group of hard-drinking writers and artists set in a little fishing village near the Spanish / French border. Salvador Dalí, Marcel Duchamp, Man Ray, Picasso, Andre Breton and other great artists once lived in Cadaqués. The U.S. Embassy in Berlin selected Cadaqués as part of its American Literature Series 2014. In an interview about the book on Deutsche Welle television, Lederer described the story as being "about an American writer wrestling with some of the same addiction issues I have wrestled with. I became an expert in stupid, and thanks to all the pot and booze somehow about thirty-five years of my life just evaporated. I figured I may as well put some of that experience to good use. Lemons to lemonade." The magazine InKultura wrote, "With literary ferocity, Lederer tells the story of a summer that begins in exceedingly good spirits but ends with a long fall. Cadaqués is a wonderful novel that masterfully upholds a balance between melancholy and joy, with deep empathy for the artistic endeavors but also individual failures of its characters."

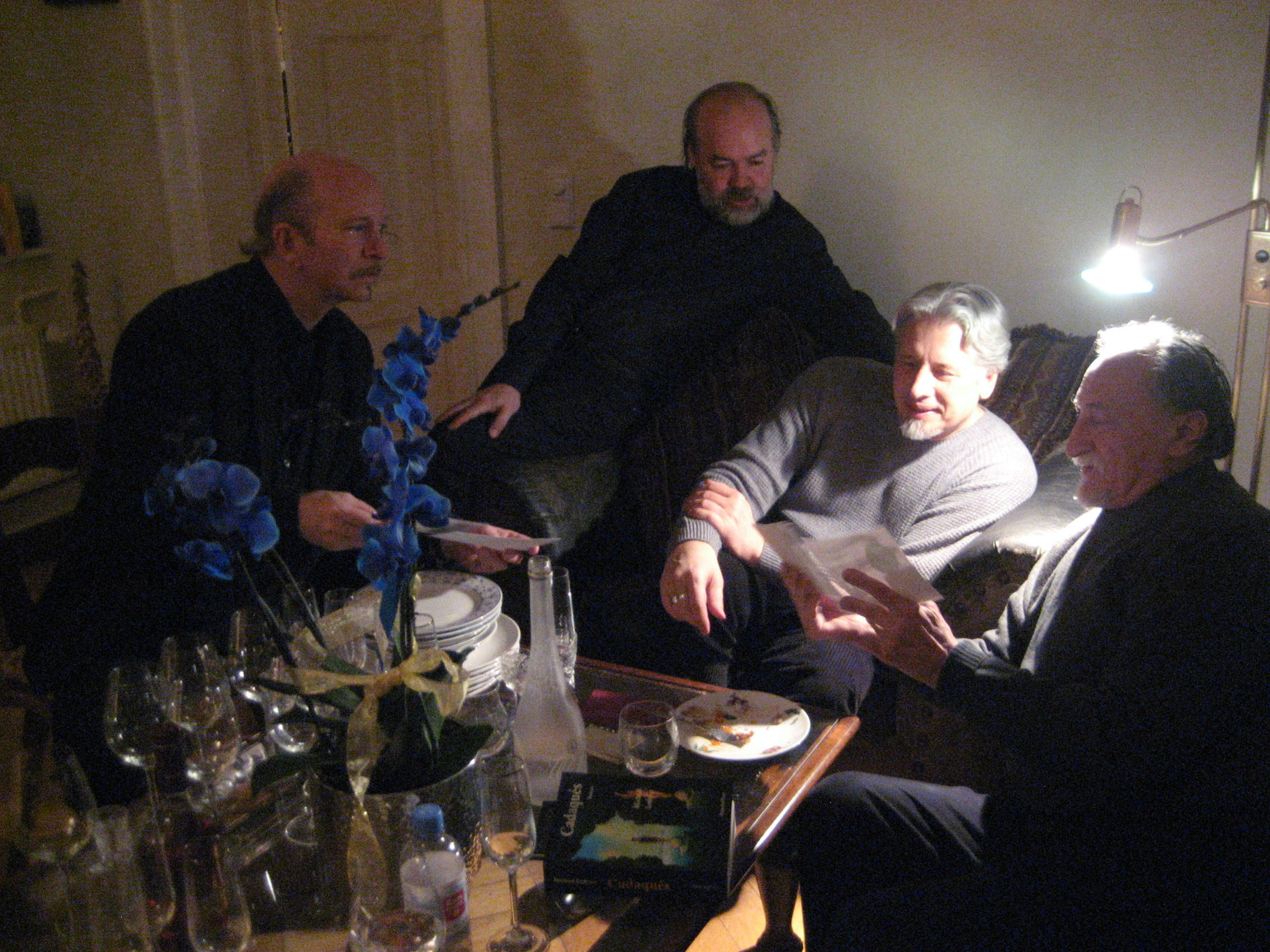
Michael Lederer in Berlin 2014 with Genia Chef, Vladimir Sorokin and Boris Mikhailov.

=== "Saving America" ===
In January 2015, Lederer published an article in the American Studies Journal blog announcing his new novel-in-progress, "Saving America". Lederer told Deutsche Welle television that the new book is about "an insanely optimistic older man, Don Hotey, who picks up a 19-year-old hitchhiker named Sancho, and together they set out in an old hand-painted VW van in hopes of getting America to the sweet place Don believes it is destined to be. Mixed success." Lederer was invited by Martin Luther University Halle-Wittenberg to read from the manuscript at the Muhlenberg Center in November 2017. In March 2018, during the Leipzig Book Fair, the U.S. Embassy presented another reading at the Zeitgeschichtliches Forum. Lederer revealed in Leipzig that "For the last ten months, I have been developing a screenplay based on this story as it has evolved. Soon I'll return to work on the book. So the screenplay is based on a novel which in turn will be based on the screenplay. This dog is chasing its own tail. We'll see if it catches anything." The screenplay for "Saving America" won the bronze prize for comedy in the 2019 PAGE International Screenwriting Awards.

=== "In The Widdle Wat Of Time" ===
In March 2016, a collection of Lederer's poetry and very short stories was published in Berlin. When asked about the title of the new book in an interview on National Public Radio (NPR), Lederer explained that there are two photos of himself on the cover, one as a three-year-old, another as a 59-year-old. "If you had spoken to the three year old me about being fifty-nine he would have thought, 'That's so many forevers away!' But now looking back the fifty-nine year old, reflecting on being three - that was the day before yesterday. So "In The Widdle Wat Of Time" is meant to take a stab at how puzzling and mysterious this thing called time is. It can seem short or long, depending on perspective."

== Personal life ==
Lederer is a member of the Kunstlerhof group of artists in Berlin. He is a lifetime member of the National Arts Club in New York City, and is a member of the Players Club, also in New York City. Lederer has lived in Berlin since 2003. Since 2015, he is a Jury member of Boddinale. Lederer and his Polish-born wife Katarina have three children, Lukas born 2009, Alexander born 2011, and Katarina born 2012. Lederer also has a son by an earlier marriage, Nicholas born 1988.

== Further reading and interviews ==
- Interview: Deutsche Welle Television
- Interview: U.S. Embassy Berlin
- Interview: English Theatre Berlin
- Interview: Kulturring Berlin
- Interview: The Palladium Times
- Interview: Buch Magazin
- Interview: The Land Community
- Interview: Forum Magazin
- Interview: Dubrovnik Times
- Interview: Sleeper Trains
- Interview: Radio Cadaques
- Interview: Moskar Magazine Vlasic, Irina. (March 25, 2011) "Malo Je Mjesta Na Svijetu". Moskar Magazine (12–15)
- More Croatian press regarding Dubrovnik Shakespeare Festiva
