= Raymond Lederer =

American politician (1938–2008)

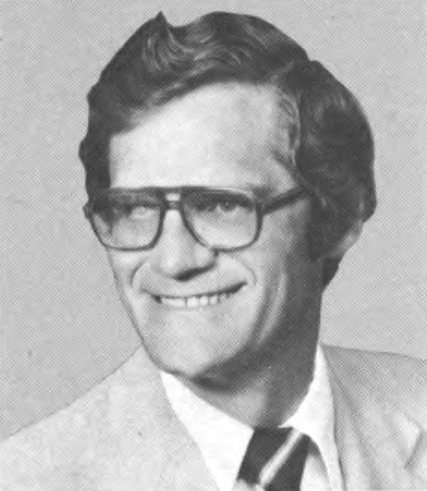

Member of the U.S. House of Representatives from Pennsylvania's 3rd district
- In office January 3, 1977 – April 29, 1981
- Preceded by: Bill Green
- Succeeded by: Joseph Smith

Member of the Pennsylvania House of Representatives from the 180th district
- In office January 2, 1973 – November 30, 1976
- Preceded by: William Lederer
- Succeeded by: Clifford Gray

Personal details
- Born: Raymond Francis Lederer; May 19, 1938 Philadelphia, Pennsylvania, U.S.
- Died: December 1, 2008 (aged 70) Philadelphia, Pennsylvania, U.S.
- Resting place: Holy Sepulchre Cemetery, Cheltenham Township, Pennsylvania, U.S.
- Party: Democratic
- Spouse: Eileen Coyle
- Children: 6
- Education: Saint Joseph's University; Community College of Philadelphia; Pennsylvania State University

Raymond Francis Lederer (May 19, 1938 – December 1, 2008) was an American politician who served as a Democratic Party member of the United States House of Representatives, representing Pennsylvania's 3rd congressional district from 1977 to 1981. He was convicted of taking bribes in the 1980 Abscam scandal.

== Early life ==
Lederer was born in Philadelphia on May 19, 1938, where he attended the local Catholic schools, graduating from Roman Catholic High School for Boys in 1956. He attended Saint Joseph's College of Philadelphia (now Saint Joseph's University) from 1960 to 1965, the Community College of Philadelphia from 1967 to 1969 and Pennsylvania State University, University Park, Pennsylvania, in 1972. Lederer worked as an assistant engineer for the Pennsylvania Department of Highways in 1957. He was a probation officer and later served as director of the Philadelphia Probation Department from 1967 to 1974. He was a board member of the Pennsylvania Committee on Probation.

== Politics ==
Lederer was elected to the Pennsylvania House of Representatives, where he served from 1974 to 1977. Lederer represented the same part of Philadelphia that had been served by both his father, Miles, and elder brother, William. His sister-in-law, Marie, would also go on to serve in the State House.

=== Congress ===
Lederer was elected to Congress in 1976 to represent Pennsylvania's 3rd congressional district; he won with 73% of the vote, defeating Republican Party candidate Terence J. Schade. He took office on January 3, 1977. While serving on the House Ways and Means Committee, he was able to direct shipments of fruit from Chile to be imported through the Port of Philadelphia.

Lederer was re-elected in 1978 with almost 72% of the vote over Republican candidate Raymond S. Kauffman.

=== Abscam ===
Lederer was videotaped at a motel in New York on September 11, 1979, at a meeting with two undercover agents who presented themselves as representatives of a supposed Arab sheik. Accepting $50,000 in cash, he told the agents "I can give you me" in exchange for the money.

After being implicated in the Abscam sting, Lederer was convicted of bribery on January 9, 1981, and sentenced to three years in prison and fined $20,000. Despite his indictment in the scandal, Lederer was re-elected, unlike the other members of the House implicated in the Abscam scandal. In the 1980 race, Lederer won with 54.5% of the vote, defeating Republican William J. Phillips, who had 32.8%, Consumer Party candidate Max Weiner with 9.5% and Independent John Morris with 3.2%.

The United States House Committee on Standards of Official Conduct voted to expel him on April 28, 1981. Lederer resigned the following day, citing "personal legal problems" that interfered with his ability to serve his constituents. Joseph F. Smith ran in the Democratic Party primary in a race to succeed Lederer in a special election. After losing in the primary to David B. Glancey, chairman of the Democratic City Committee, Smith ran in the July 1981 special election as both an Independent and as a Republican (with the approval of the Republican Party), and defeated Glancey, having promised in his campaign to caucus with the Democrats if elected.

Lederer served ten months in Allenwood Federal Prison. He later worked as a roofer. He died on December 1, 2008, of lung cancer, aged 70, and is interred at the Holy Sepulchre Cemetery in Cheltenham, Pennsylvania.

== See also ==
- List of American federal politicians convicted of crimes
- List of federal political scandals in the United States

Pennsylvania House of Representatives
| Preceded by William Lederer | Member of the Pennsylvania House of Representatives from the 180th district 1973–1976 | Succeeded by Clifford Gray |
U.S. House of Representatives
| Preceded by Bill Green | Member of the U.S. House of Representatives from Pennsylvania's 3rd congressional district 1977–1981 | Succeeded by Joseph Smith |
