= The Center for Arts Education =

Former nonprofit art organization in New York City

Coordinates: 40.75361°N 73.99190°W

The Center for Arts Education (CAE) was a nonprofit organization in New York City. It promoted arts education in the public schools and between 1996 and 2008 spent nearly $40 million. In 2020, it was folded into Partnership with Children.

== History ==
The Center for Arts Education was founded in 1996 to restore and sustain arts education in New York City's public schools after two decades of system-wide cutbacks in funding for arts programs. The fiscal budget crisis of the 1970s immediately impacted the City's commitment to arts education. Budget cuts resulted in teacher layoffs and the gradual abandonment of the arts as essential to academic development. For the next twenty years, hundreds of thousands of New Yorkers experienced a K-12 education without instruction in arts education, aside from schools with private funding.

In the early 1990s, the New York City Board of Education, New York City's cultural institutions, and private-sector foundations grew increasingly alarmed by the changes. By 1991, two-thirds of New York City schools had no licensed art or music teachers.

In 1993 Walter Annenberg announced the single largest gift ever made to American public education, the Annenberg Challenge, a half-billion dollar, five-year challenge grant designed to support efforts at school reform throughout the country. In a collaboration, the New York City Department of Cultural Affairs and Board of Education envisioned a five-year plan, The Annenberg Arts and Education Initiative, to initiate arts education reform. This plan, created under the guidance of consulting firm Artsvision, proposed a model for institutionalizing arts education in NYC public schools. In March 1996, The Annenberg Foundation approved the proposal and The Center for Arts Education was created to administer the initiative, serve as a liaison and oversee the distribution of funding. The Annenberg plan established CAE as an independent agency that was administratively distinct from the BOE. The initiative began with a two-to-one $12 million grant from the Annenberg Foundation, to be matched by a $12 million investment each from the public and private sectors, for a total $36 million.

In 2001 Annenberg Foundation provided another $12 million challenge grant to CAE to continue its work. This grant was to be matched by an $12 million that would be used to fund additional rounds of Partnership grants. CAE also used this second challenge grant to fund new programs that permitted parents to take part in arts education, expose teenagers to arts careers and enable existing Partnership schools to share their successes with other schools.

Cuts in education grew worse during the Great Recession. In 2020, due to a growing deficit, CAE was folded into another nonprofit, Partnership with Children, although both organizations retained their own identities.

=== Public school reform ===
The cornerstone of the Annenberg Challenge effort was the creation of "arts partnerships" in which schools, working with orchestras, museums, dance groups, theater companies, community-based organizations and other groups to institutionalize school-wide arts programs and promote school reform. In 1997, 81 of New York City's public schools were awarded the first of these three-year "Partnership Grants" to form collaborations with cultural and community-based organizations, creating an arts curricula tailored to meet the individual needs of each school. By supporting the use of the New York City's cultural resources, CAE provided a link that made institutions, ranging from the Metropolitan Museum of Art to the Pregones Theater Company in the South Bronx, an integral part of the public school system.

Over one-third of public schools applied for the $75,000 partnership grants through CAE, and while 81 schools received a grant, hundreds did not. In response, BOE, with support from former Mayor Rudolph Giuliani, created Project ARTS, the first system-wide per capita funds for the arts since the mid-seventies. Project ARTS, used for the training and hiring of arts teachers as well as arts supplies, laid the groundwork for the Blueprint for Teaching and Learning in the Arts, the first citywide arts curriculum since original cutbacks.

== Programs ==
CAE offered family engagement programs, professional development opportunities for the education industry and career development training for high school students. CAE's programs include:

- Parents As Arts Partners Grant: supports arts activities for parents and children. The PAAP grant, which funds 150 schools, engages families with hands-on interactive arts experiences, including workshops with Teaching artists and visits to cultural organizations.

== Awards ==
- 2010 Bronze Telly Award for the documentary video MS 223: The Power of Arts Education
- 2007 Bronze Telly Award for the documentary video A Decade of Progress: 1996-2006
- 2002 NYC Governor's Arts Award
- 2001 The Arts and Business Council Visionary Award presented to CAE Board Chair Laurie Tisch
- 2001 New York State Assembly Citation
- 2000 The Arts and Business Council Encore Award presented to former Executive Director Hollis Headrick
- 2000 Former Mayor Rudolph Giuliani declares Thursday, March 15, 2001 as “The Center for Arts Education Day”
