= Marie Lederer =

American politician (1927–2025)

Marie A. Lederer

Member of the Pennsylvania House of Representatives from the 175th district
- In office January 5, 1993 – January 2, 2007
- Preceded by: Gerard Kosinski
- Succeeded by: Michael O'Brien

Personal details
- Born: Marie A. Panosetti; October 24, 1927 Philadelphia, Pennsylvania, U.S.
- Died: February 26, 2025 (aged 97)
- Party: Democratic
- Spouse: William J. Lederer (d. 2008)
- Children: 3
- Parent(s): Donato and Edith Panosetti

Marie A. Lederer (née Panosetti; October 24, 1927 – February 26, 2025) was an American politician from the state of Pennsylvania. She became the fourth member of her family to represent Philadelphia in the Pennsylvania House of Representatives, serving from 1993 to 2007.

== Formative years ==
Born in Philadelphia as Marie A. Panosetti on October 24, 1927, she graduated from Little Flower Catholic High School for Girls in Philadelphia, Pennsylvania in 1945. She also attended Temple University. She subsequently married William J. Lederer.

== Political and government career ==
A member of the Pennsylvania Democratic State Committee, Marie Lederer served as an assistant to the Deputy Pennsylvania Auditor General.

Lederer became the fourth member of her family to represent Philadelphia in the Pennsylvania House of Representatives. Her husband, William J. Lederer, and father-in-law, Miles W. Lederer, were both members of the same body. Another family member, Raymond Lederer, served in the House prior to becoming a congressman. She retired during the 2006 elections.

Lederer died at the age of 97 on February 26, 2025.
