= Clifford Gray (politician) =

American politician (born 1940)

Member of the Pennsylvania House of Representatives from the 180th district
- In office January 4, 1977 – November 30, 1982
- Preceded by: Raymond Lederer
- Succeeded by: James McIntyre

Personal details
- Born: May 31, 1940 (age 86) Philadelphia, Pennsylvania
- Party: Democratic

Clifford Gray Jr. (born May 31, 1940) is a former Democratic member of the Pennsylvania House of Representatives. Gray was a member of the 31st Ward Democratic Executive Committee. A Democrat, he was elected to the Pennsylvania House of Representatives for the 1977 term. After serving a total of three consecutive terms, he ran unsuccessful campaigns for reelection for the 1983 and 1985 terms of the Pennsylvania House. During his first term, he served as the subcommittee chair for the Pennsylvania House's State Government Committee; during his second term, he served as the subcommittee chair of the Urban Affairs Committee.

Born in Philadelphia, Pennsylvania, Gray attended Hackett Elementary School, Penn Treaty Junior High School, Edison High School, and Frankford High School.
