= William H. Maxwell Career and Technical Education High School =

Public school in New York City

Coordinates: 40°40′26″N 73°53′47″W

William H. Maxwell Career and Technical High School
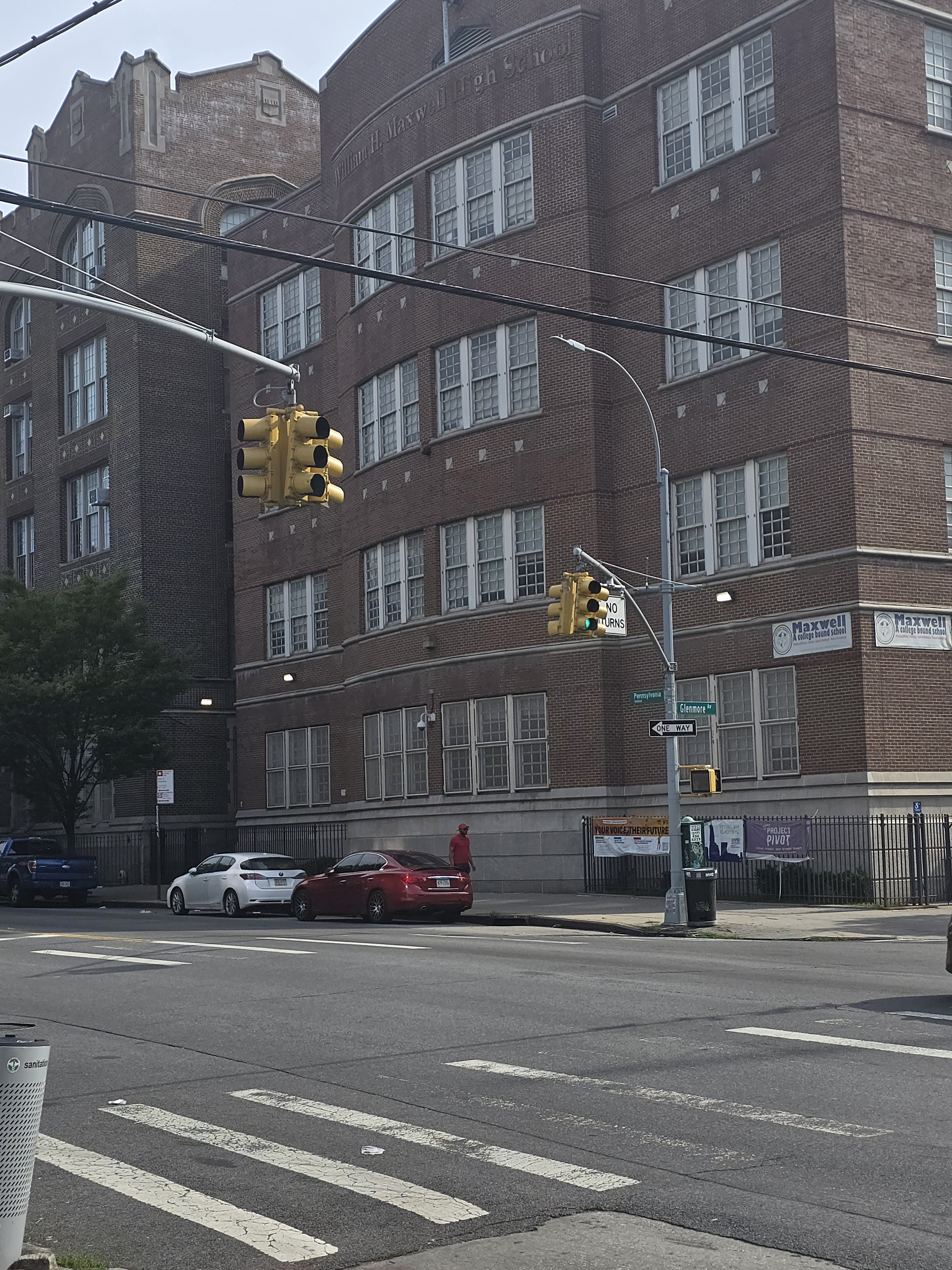

Location
- 145 Pennsylvania Avenue; Brooklyn, New York 11207; United States

Information
- Established: 1950; 76 years ago

William H. Maxwell Career and Technical High School is a vocational high school in Brooklyn, New York. It lies on Pennsylvania Avenue in the upper half of the East New York neighborhood, close to Liberty Avenue subway station on the C train. The building was built in 1912, but it was re-chartered as a high school in 1950. The school offers vocational training in a variety of subjects, including cosmetology, fashion, medical assisting and related visual instruction.
