= William J. Lederer (Pennsylvania politician) =

American politician

Member of the Pennsylvania House of Representatives from the 180th district
- In office January 5, 1971 – November 30, 1972
- Preceded by: German Quiles
- Succeeded by: Raymond Lederer

Member of the Pennsylvania House of Representatives from the Philadelphia County district
- In office January 1, 1965 – November 30, 1968

Personal details
- Born: December 14, 1924 Philadelphia, Pennsylvania
- Died: January 20, 2008 (aged 83) Philadelphia
- Party: Democratic
- Spouse: Marie
- Children: Doneda, William, Regina
- Occupation: Attorney, Jurist, Politician

William J. Lederer (December 14, 1924 – January 20, 2008) was an American politician and judge.

== Formative years and education ==
Born in Philadelphia, Pennsylvania on December 14, 1924, Lederer served as a staff sergeant and Information and Education Director with the United States Army during World War II (1943, North Africa: 1944-1946, Burma, India, and China). He then returned home to finish his schooling. After graduating from North East High School in 1946, he earned his Bachelor of Science degree in political science from La Salle University in 1950 and his Bachelor of Law degree (LL.B) from Temple University Beasley School of Law in 1953.

In addition, he attended and/or rendered service to: the Judicial College of Harvard Law, Graduate Division; National Judicial College, University of Nevada (1974); Pennsylvania College of the State Judiciary seminars (1974-1975, 1977); and the National College of Juvenile Court Judges (1976).

== Political, legal and education career ==
In 1954, Lederer served as deputy president and council aide to the Philadelphia City Council, and also later served as Sergeant-at-Arms for the Philadelphia County Democratic Executive Committee. From 1955 to 1957, he served as the executive deputy secretary of revenue to Judge Gerald Gleason and, in 1957, as the special deputy attorney general to Justice Thomas McBride. A visiting lecturer at Temple University's Law School from 1957 through 1977, he also served as general counsel to Philadelphia County's Office of the Register of Wills from 1958 to 1963, and as the chair of the Veterans Commission of Philadelphia from 1958 to 1964.

Elected as a Democrat to the Pennsylvania House of Representatives, Lederer was a serving member of the House from 1963 to 1968 and from 1971 to 1974. In 1974, he served as a Pennsylvania state court judge including the Pennsylvania Courts of Common Pleas. Lederer died from cancer at the University of Pennsylvania Hospital in Philadelphia. His father Miles, his brother Raymond, and his wife Marie also served in the Pennsylvania General Assembly.
