= 2023 United States state legislative elections =

- November 7, 2023

8 legislative chambers 4 states
Party	Republican	Democratic	Coalition
Current chambers	57	40	2 (Note: The Alaska House of Representatives is controlled by a coalition of 19 Republicans, 2 Democrats, and 2 Independents. The Alaska Senate is controlled by a grand coalition of 9 Democrats and 8 Republicans.)
Chambers after	56	41	2
Overall change	▼1	▲1	Steady
- Map of upper house elections: Democrats retained control Republicans retained control Special elections held

- Map of lower house elections: Democrats gained control Democrats retained control Republicans retained control Special elections held

The 2023 United States state legislative elections were held on November 7, 2023, for eight state legislative chambers in four states. These off-year elections coincided with other state and local elections, including gubernatorial elections in three states. Special elections were held throughout the year in several states.

The Democratic Party flipped control of Virginia's lower house, the House of Delegates, which it had lost two years earlier, and retained its majority in Virginia's upper house, the Senate. Democrats also expanded their majority in the New Jersey Legislature. The Republican Party strengthened its majorities in the Mississippi and Louisiana legislatures.

== Background ==
The 2022 elections, midterm elections held under the presidency of Democrat Joe Biden, defied conventional expectations. Although Republicans had gained more legislative seats across the country than Democrats, they had lost control of several state legislative chambers. Republican gains were more concentrated in chambers they already controlled, while Democrats made more gains in states they controlled, as well as in battleground states where independent or court-ordered redistricting had dismantled the Republican-tilted maps of the 2010s. This enhanced Democratic policymaking power at the state level despite Republican victories at the federal level.

Among the states holding regularly-scheduled legislative elections in 2023, Republicans had fully controlled the Mississippi and Louisiana legislatures since 2011, while Democrats had controlled the New Jersey Legislature since 2003. Virginia had a divided government after Republicans won control of the House of Delegates in 2021.

=== Party switching ===
Total net change in legislative seats due to party switching in 2023: +1 Rep seat +1 Dem seat / +1 Ind seat +2 Ind seats / +1 Lib seat

Republicans gained significant clout in two state legislatures prior to the election due to party switching by incumbent legislators. In both Louisiana and North Carolina, party-switching Democrats gave Republicans supermajorities in each state's House of Representatives which, combined with Republicans' existing supermajorities in each state's Senate, gave the party the ability to override vetoes of each state's Democratic governors.

State	Chamber	District	Legislator	Old party	New party	Source
Georgia	House	56	Mesha Mainor	Democratic	Republican	
Louisiana	House	18	Jeremy LaCombe	Democratic	Republican	
Louisiana	House	19	Francis C. Thompson	Democratic	Republican	
Louisiana	House	62	Roy Daryl Adams	Independent	Democratic	
Nebraska	Legislature	8	Megan Hunt	Democratic	Independent	
New Hampshire	House	Cheshire 7	Shaun Filiault	Democratic	Independent	
New Hampshire	House	Hillsborough 2	Dan Hynes	Republican	Independent	
New Jersey	Senate	12	Samuel D. Thompson	Republican	Democratic	
North Carolina	House	112	Tricia Cotham	Democratic	Republican	
Oregon	Senate	12	Brian Boquist	Independent	Republican	
South Carolina	Senate	22	Mia McLeod	Democratic	Independent	
Vermont	House	Rutland 3	Jarrod Sammis	Republican	Libertarian	
West Virginia	House	50	Elliott Pritt	Democratic	Republican	

== Summary table ==
Regularly scheduled elections were held in 8 of the 99 state legislative chambers in the United States. Nationwide, regularly scheduled elections were or are to be held for 578 of the 7,383 legislative seats. This table only covers regularly scheduled elections; additional special elections may take place concurrently with these regularly scheduled elections.

State	Upper House				Lower House			
State	Seats up	Total	% up	Term	Seats up	Total	% up	Term
Louisiana	39	39	100	4	105	105	100	4
Mississippi	52	52	100	4	122	122	100	4
New Jersey	40	40	100	4 (Note: The upper houses of Arkansas, Delaware, Florida, Hawaii, Illinois, Minnesota, New Jersey, and Texas use a 2-4-4 term length system.)	80	80	100	2
Virginia	40	40	100	4	100	100	100	2

== Election predictions ==
Several sites and individuals publish predictions of competitive chambers. These predictions look at factors such as the strength of the party, the strength of the candidates, and the partisan leanings of the state (reflected in part by the state's Cook Partisan Voting Index rating). The predictions assign ratings to each chambers, with the rating indicating the predicted advantage that a party has in winning that election.

Most election predictors use:

- "Tossup": No advantage
- "Tilt": Advantage that is not quite as strong as "lean"
- "Lean": Slight advantage
- "Likely": Significant, but surmountable, advantage
- "Safe" or "Solid": Near-certain chance of victory

State	PVI	Chamber	Last election	270toWin November 2, 2023	Elections Daily November 2, 2023	Result
Louisiana	R+12	Senate	R 27–12	Safe R	Safe R	R 28–11
Louisiana	R+12	House of Representatives	R 71–33–1	Safe R	Safe R	R 73–32
Mississippi	R+11	Senate	R 36–16	Safe R	Safe R	R 36–16
Mississippi	R+11	House of Representatives	R 77–42–3	Safe R	Safe R	R 79–41–2
New Jersey	D+6	Senate	D 25–15	Safe D	Safe D	D 25–15
New Jersey	D+6	General Assembly	D 46–34	Safe D	Safe D	D 52–28
Virginia	D+3	Senate	D 22–18	Lean D	Lean D	D 21–19
Virginia	D+3	House of Delegates	R 52–48	Lean D (flip)	Tossup	D 51–49

== National results ==
Despite Republican hopes of major gains, potentially winning full control of Virginia's state government and weakening Democrats' majorities in New Jersey, these gains did not materialize. Instead, Democrats made considerable gains in both states' lower houses, flipping control of the Virginia House of Delegates, which they had lost in 2021. Republicans did gain ground in Louisiana and Mississippi, however, as both states held their first elections since the 2020 redistricting cycle. Rampant gerrymandering, political polarization, and a high number of uncontested races led to minimal competition. Neither state featured a single legislative race won by less than 10 percentage points.

== State summaries ==
=== Louisiana ===
Senate results

House of Representatives results

All seats of the Louisiana State Senate and the Louisiana House of Representatives were up for election to four-year terms in 2023. Republicans retained control of both chambers.

Louisiana State Senate
Party	Leader	Before	After	Change
Republican	Page Cortez (term-limited)	27	28	▲1
Democratic	Gerald Boudreaux	12	11	▼1
Total		39	39	

Louisiana House of Representatives
Party	Leader	Before	After	Change
Republican	Clay Schexnayder (term-limited)	71	73	▲2
Democratic	Samuel Jenkins Jr. (retired)	33	32	▼1
Independent	Joseph A. Marino III (retired)	1	0	▼1
Total		105	105	

=== Mississippi ===
Senate results

House of Representatives results

All seats of the Mississippi State Senate and the Mississippi House of Representatives were up for election to four-year terms in 2023. Republicans retained control of both chambers.

Mississippi State Senate
Party	Leader	Before	After	Change
Republican	Dean Kirby	36	36	Steady
Democratic	Derrick Simmons	16	16	Steady
Total		52	52	

Mississippi House of Representatives
Party	Leader	Before	After	Change
Republican	Philip Gunn (retired)	77	79	▲2
Democratic	Robert Johnson III	42	41	▼1
Independent		3	2	▼1
Total		122	122	

=== New Jersey ===
Senate results

General Assembly results

All seats of the New Jersey Senate and the New Jersey General Assembly were up for election. In 2023, senators were elected to four-year terms in single-member districts, while Assembly members were elected to two-year terms in two-member districts. Democrats retained control in both chambers, expanding their majority in the General Assembly.

New Jersey Senate
Party	Leader	Before	After	Change
Democratic	Nicholas Scutari	25	25	Steady
Republican	Anthony M. Bucco	15	15	Steady
Total		40	40	

New Jersey General Assembly
Party	Leader	Before	After	Change
Democratic	Craig Coughlin	46	52	▲6
Republican	John DiMaio	34	28	▼6
Total		80	80	

=== Virginia ===
Senate results

House of Delegates results

All seats of the Virginia Senate and the Virginia House of Delegates were up for election in 2023. Senators were elected to four-year terms, while delegates serve terms of two years. At the time of the elections, the Democrats controlled the Senate while the Republicans controlled the House of Delegates. Following the elections, the Democrats flipped control of the House of Delegates and held on to the Senate with a reduced majority.

Virginia Senate
Party	Leader	Before	After	Change
Democratic	Dick Saslaw (retired)	22	21	▼1
Republican	Tommy Norment (retired)	17	19	▲2
Non-caucusing	Amanda Chase	1	0	▼1
Total		40	40	

Virginia House of Delegates
Party	Leader	Before	After	Change
Democratic	Don Scott	48	51	▲3
Republican	Todd Gilbert	52	49	▼3
Total		100	100	

== Special elections ==
Total net change in legislative seats due to special elections in 2023: +1 Rep seat / +1 Dem seat

There were fifty-one state legislative special elections scheduled for 2023. The Democratic Party flipped a seat in the Virginia Senate on January 10 and a seat in the New Hampshire House of Representatives on September 19. The Republican Party flipped a seat in the Maine House of Representatives on June 13 and a seat in the Massachusetts Senate on November 7.

=== Connecticut ===
District		Incumbent			This race	
Chamber	No.	Representative	Party	First elected	Results	Candidates
House	6	Edwin Vargas	Democratic	2012	Incumbent resigned January 3, 2023 to pursue an academic post at Central Connecticut State University. New member elected February 28, 2023. Democratic hold.	▌ ✓ James Sánchez (Democratic) 62.1%; ▌Jason Diaz (Independent) 37.9%
House	100	Quentin Williams	Democratic	2018	Incumbent died January 5, 2023, in a traffic collision. New member elected February 28, 2023. Democratic hold.	▌ ✓ Kai Juanna Belton (Democratic) 68.9%; ▌Deborah Kleckowski (Republican) 31.1%
House	148	Daniel J. Fox	Democratic	2011 (special)	Incumbent resigned January 4, 2023, in anticipation of a nomination to be a judge of the Connecticut Superior Court. New member elected February 28, 2023. Democratic hold.	▌ ✓ Anabel Figueroa (Democratic) 61.0%; ▌Olga Anastos (Republican) 39.0%

=== Delaware ===
District		Incumbent			This race	
Chamber	No.	Representative	Party	First elected	Results	Candidates
House	37	Ruth Briggs King	Republican	2009 (special)	Incumbent resigned November 15, 2023, after moving out of her district. New member elected December 21, 2023. Republican hold.	▌ ✓ Valerie Jones Giltner (Republican) 62.7%; ▌Jane Hovington (Democratic) 37.1%

=== Florida ===
District		Incumbent			This race	
Chamber	No.	Representative	Party	First elected	Results	Candidates
House	24	Joe Harding	Republican	2020	Incumbent resigned December 8, 2022, after being indicted for wire fraud and money laundering. New member elected May 16, 2023. Republican hold.	▌ ✓ Ryan Chamberlin (Republican) 78.0%; ▌Robert "Foxy" Fox (Republican, write-in) 22.0%
House	118	Juan Fernandez-Barquin	Republican	2018	Incumbent resigned June 11, 2023, to become clerk of the court and comptroller of Miami-Dade County. New member elected December 5, 2023. Republican hold.	▌ ✓ Mike Redondo (Republican) 51.8%; ▌Johnny Farias (Democratic) 45.6%; ▌Francisco De La Paz (Independent) 2.6%

=== Georgia ===
District		Incumbent			This race	
Chamber	No.	Representative	Party	First elected	Results	Candidates
House	7	David Ralston	Republican	2002	Incumbent died November 16, 2022, after a long illness. New member elected January 31, 2023, after no one received over 50% of the vote on January 3, 2023. Republican hold.	▌ ✓ Johnny Chastain (Republican) 52.8%; ▌Sheree Ralston (Republican) 47.2%
House	119	Terry England; Redistricted from the 116th district	Republican	2004	Incumbent's term expired January 9, 2023. Representative-elect Danny Rampey withdrew prior to being seated, after being arrested for stealing prescription narcotics. New member elected February 28, 2023, after no one received over 50% of the vote on January 31, 2023. Republican hold.	▌ ✓ Holt Persinger (Republican) 59.3%; ▌Charles Chase III (Republican) 40.7%
House	172	Sam Watson	Republican	2012	Incumbent resigned December 30, 2022, to run for State Senate. New member elected January 31, 2023. Republican hold.	▌ ✓ Charles Cannon (Republican)
Senate	11	Dean Burke	Republican	2013 (special)	Incumbent resigned December 31, 2022, to become chief medical officer of the Georgia Department of Community Health. New member elected January 31, 2023. Republican hold.	▌ ✓ Sam Watson (Republican) 76.0%; ▌Mary Weaver-Anderson (Democratic) 23.0%; ▌John Monds (Libertarian) 1.0%
House	75	Mike Glanton	Democratic	2012	Incumbent resigned January 24, 2023, for health reasons. New member elected March 21, 2023. Democratic hold.	▌ ✓ Eric Bell II (Democratic) 61.6%; ▌Herman Andrews (Democratic) 27.0%; ▌Della Ashley (Republican) 11.4%
House	68	Tish Naghise	Democratic	2022	Incumbent died March 8, 2023, of a recent illness. New member elected June 13, 2023, after no one received over 50% of the vote on May 16, 2023. Democratic hold.	▌ ✓ Derrick Jackson (Democratic) 50.4%; ▌Mark Baker (Democratic) 49.6%

=== Kentucky ===
District		Incumbent			This race	
Chamber	No.	Representative	Party	First elected	Results	Candidates
Senate	19	Morgan McGarvey	Democratic	2012	Incumbent resigned January 1, 2023, to become a U.S. representative. New member elected February 21, 2023. Democratic hold.	▌ ✓ Cassie Chambers Armstrong (Democratic) 77.0%; ▌Misty Glin (Republican) 22.9%
Senate	28	Ralph Alvarado	Republican	2014	Incumbent resigned January 6, 2023, to become commissioner of the Tennessee Department of Health. New member elected May 16, 2023. Republican hold.	▌ ✓ Greg Elkins (Republican) 49.8%; ▌Robert Sainte (Democratic) 31.3%; ▌Richard Henderson (Independent) 18.9%
House	93	Lamin Swann	Democratic	2022	Incumbent died May 14, 2023, after being hospitalized for a medical emergency. New member elected November 7, 2023. Democratic hold.	▌ ✓ Adrielle Camuel (Democratic) 57.6%; ▌Kyle Whalen (Republican) 42.4%

=== Louisiana ===
District		Incumbent			This race	
Chamber	No.	Representative	Party	First elected	Results	Candidates
House	93	Royce Duplessis	Democratic	2018 (special)	Incumbent resigned December 6, 2022, to join the State Senate. New member elected March 25, 2023, after no one received over 50% of the vote on February 18, 2023. Democratic hold.	▌ ✓ Alonzo Knox (Democratic) 54.3%; ▌Sibil "Fox" Richardson (Democratic) 45.7%

=== Maine ===
District		Incumbent			This race	
Chamber	No.	Representative	Party	First elected	Results	Candidates
House	45	Clinton Collamore	Democratic	2022	Incumbent resigned February 16, 2023, after being indicted for forging signatures to qualify for public campaign funds. New member elected June 13, 2023. Republican gain.	▌ ✓ Abden Simmons (Republican) 52.2%; ▌Wendy Pieh (Democratic) 47.8%
House	50	Sean Paulhus	Democratic	2019 (special)	Incumbent resigned July 14, 2023, to become register of probate of Sagadahoc County. New member elected November 7, 2023. Democratic hold.	▌ ✓ David Sinclair (Democratic)

=== Massachusetts ===
District		Incumbent			This race	
Chamber	No.	Representative	Party	First elected	Results	Candidates
House	Suffolk 9	Jon Santiago	Democratic	2018	Incumbent resigned March 1, 2023, to become Massachusetts' Secretary of the Executive Office of Veterans' Services. New member elected May 30, 2023. Democratic hold.	▌ ✓ John F. Moran (Democratic) 97.7%; ▌Write-in 2.3%
House	Suffolk 10	Ed Coppinger	Democratic	2010	Incumbent resigned February 28, 2023, to become head of government affairs of the Massachusetts Biotechnology Council. New member elected May 30, 2023. Democratic hold.	▌ ✓ Bill MacGregor (Democratic) 93.0%; ▌Write-in 7.0%
Senate	Worcester and Hampshire	Anne Gobi	Democratic	2014	Incumbent resigned June 4, 2023, to become Massachusetts' Director of Rural Affairs of the Executive Office of Economic Development. New member elected November 7, 2023. Republican gain.	▌ ✓ Peter Durant (Republican) 54.2%; ▌Jonathan Zlotnik (Democratic) 45.2%

=== Minnesota ===
District		Incumbent			This race	
Chamber	No.	Representative	Party	First elected	Results	Candidates
House	52B	Ruth Richardson	DFL	2018	Incumbent resigned September 1, 2023, to focus on her role as president and CEO of Planned Parenthood North Central States. New member elected December 5, 2023. Democratic hold.	▌ ✓ Bianca Virnig (DFL) 58.2%; ▌Cynthia Lonnquist (Republican) 40.9%; ▌Charles Kuchlenz (Libertarian) 0.9%

=== Mississippi ===
District		Incumbent			This race	
Chamber	No.	Representative	Party	First elected	Results	Candidates
House	23	Charles Beckett	Republican	2003	Incumbent resigned September 22, 2022, to become executive director of the Mississippi Public Utilities Staff. New member elected January 31, 2023, after no one received over 50% of the vote on January 10, 2023. Republican hold. (Note: Special elections in Mississippi are officially nonpartisan. However, the candidate qualifying list for the 2023 Mississippi elections indicates that Perry Van Bailey and Andrew Stepp are Republicans, while Andy Clark is an independent.)	▌ ✓ Perry Van Bailey (Nonpartisan) 50.1%; ▌ Andrew Stepp (Nonpartisan) 49.9%

=== New Hampshire ===
District		Incumbent			This race	
Chamber	No.	Representative	Party	First elected	Results	Candidates
House	Strafford 8	Chuck Grassie	Democratic	2016	Regular election tied, resulting in a do-over election. Incumbent re-elected February 21, 2023. Democratic hold.	▌ ✓ Chuck Grassie (Democratic) 55.7%; ▌David Walker (Republican) 44.3%
House	Hillsborough 3	Stacie-Marie Laughton	Democratic	2020	Incumbent resigned December 22, 2022, after being arrested for stalking. New member elected May 16, 2023. Democratic hold.	▌ ✓ Marc Plamondon (Democratic) 71.6%; ▌David Narkunas (Republican) 28.4%
House	Grafton 16	Joshua Adjutant	Democratic	2018	Incumbent resigned April 1, 2023, after suffering a head injury while working as a security officer. New member elected August 22, 2023. Democratic hold.	▌ ✓ David Fracht (Democratic) 71.8%; ▌John Keane (Republican) 28.2%
House	Rockingham 1	Benjamin T. Bartlett IV	Republican	2022	Incumbent resigned April 26, 2023, for health reasons. New member elected September 19, 2023. Democratic gain.	▌ ✓ Hal Rafter (Democratic) 55.9%; ▌Jim Guzofski (Republican) 44.1%
House	Hillsborough 3	David Cote	Democratic	1982	Incumbent resigned July 5, 2023, due to health issues. (Note: Cote was never officially sworn in for the 2023 session and did not cast a single vote.); New member elected November 7, 2023. Democratic hold.	▌ ✓ Paige Beauchemin (Democratic) 60.7%; ▌David Narkunas (Republican) 39.3%

=== New York ===
District		Incumbent			This race	
Chamber	No.	Representative	Party	First elected	Results	Candidates
Assembly	27	Daniel Rosenthal	Democratic	2017 (special)	Incumbent resigned July 14, 2023, to take a position at UJA-Federation of New York. New member elected September 12, 2023. Democratic hold.	▌ ✓ Sam Berger (Democratic) 55.3%; ▌▌David Hirsch (Republican) 44.5%

=== Oklahoma ===
District		Incumbent			This race	
Chamber	No.	Representative	Party	First elected	Results	Candidates
Senate	32	John Michael Montgomery	Republican	2018	Incumbent resigned August 1, 2023, to become president of the Lawton Chamber of Commerce. New member elected December 12, 2023. Republican hold.	▌ ✓ Dusty Deevers (Republican) 55.5%; ▌Larry Bush (Democratic) 44.5%

=== Pennsylvania ===
District		Incumbent			This race	
Chamber	No.	Representative	Party	First elected	Results	Candidates
Senate	27	John Gordner	Republican	2003 (special)	Incumbent resigned November 30, 2022, to become counsel to incoming President pro tempore of the Pennsylvania Senate Kim Ward. New member elected January 31, 2023. Republican hold.	▌ ✓ Lynda Schlegel Culver (Republican) 68.7%; ▌Patricia Lawson (Democratic) 31.3%
House	32	Anthony DeLuca	Democratic	1982	Incumbent died October 9, 2022, of lymphoma. New member elected February 7, 2023. (Note: Democratic Majority Leader of the Pennsylvania House of Representatives Joanna McClinton scheduled the special election for February 7. However, Republican Minority Leader Bryan Cutler unsuccessfully sought to wait until May 13 as an attempt to delay the Democrats from leading the chamber.); Democratic hold.	▌ ✓ Joe McAndrew (Democratic) 75.0%; ▌Clay Walker (Republican) 25.0%
House	34	Summer Lee	Democratic	2018	Incumbent resigned December 7, 2022, to become a U.S. representative. New member elected February 7, 2023. Democratic hold.	▌ ✓ Abigail Salisbury (Democratic) 87.9%; ▌Robert Pagane (Republican) 12.1%
House	35	Austin Davis	Democratic	2018 (special)	Incumbent resigned December 7, 2022, to become Lieutenant Governor of Pennsylvania. New member elected February 7, 2023. Democratic hold.	▌ ✓ Matt Gergely (Democratic) 74.7%; ▌Don Nevills (Republican) 25.3%
House	108	Lynda Schlegel Culver	Republican	2010	Incumbent resigned February 28, 2023, to join the State Senate. New member elected May 16, 2023. Republican hold.	▌ ✓ Michael Stender (Republican) 58.3%; ▌Trevor Finn (Democratic) 38.2%; ▌Elijah Scretching (Libertarian) 3.5%
House	163	Michael Zabel	Democratic	2018	Incumbent resigned March 16, 2023, following accusations of sexual harassment. New member elected May 16, 2023. Democratic hold.	▌ ✓ Heather Boyd (Democratic) 60.2%; ▌Katie Ford (Republican) 38.6%; ▌Alfe Goodwin (Libertarian) 1.2%
House	21	Sara Innamorato	Democratic	2018	Incumbent resigned July 19, 2023, to focus on her campaign for Allegheny County executive. New member elected September 19, 2023. Democratic hold.	▌ ✓ Lindsay Powell (Democratic) 65.5%; ▌Erin Autenreith (Republican) 34.5%

=== Rhode Island ===
District		Incumbent			This race	
Chamber	No.	Senator	Party	First elected	Results	Candidates
Senate	1	Maryellen Goodwin	Democratic	1986	Incumbent died April 15, 2023, of colorectal cancer. New member elected November 7, 2023. Democratic hold.	▌ ✓ Jake Bissaillon (Democratic) 82.8%; ▌Niyoka Powell (Republican) 16.4%

=== South Carolina ===
District		Incumbent			This race	
Chamber	No.	Representative	Party	First elected	Results	Candidates
Senate	42	Marlon Kimpson	Democratic	2013 (special)	Incumbent resigned May 11, 2023, after an appointment to the Advisory Committee for Trade Policy and Negotiations within the Office of the U.S. Trade Representative. New member elected November 7, 2023. Democratic hold.	▌ ✓ Deon Tedder (Democratic) 81.7%; ▌Rosa Kay (Republican) 17.9%

=== Tennessee ===
District		Incumbent			This race	
Chamber	No.	Representative	Party	First elected	Results	Candidates
House	86	Barbara Cooper	Democratic	1996	Incumbent died October 25, 2022. New member elected March 14, 2023. (Note: Justin J. Pearson was appointed as interim representative by the Shelby County Board of Commissioners on January 25.); Democratic hold.	▌ ✓ Justin J. Pearson (Democratic) 97.8%; ▌Write-in 2.2%
House	3	Scotty Campbell	Republican	2020	Incumbent resigned April 20, 2023, after an ethics subcommittee found he sexually harassed two interns. New member elected August 3, 2023. (Note: Timothy Hill was appointed as interim representative by the Johnson County Commission on May 11.); Republican hold.	▌ ✓ Timothy Hill (Republican) 74.5%; ▌Lori Love (Democratic) 25.5%
House	52	Justin Jones	Democratic	2022	Incumbent expelled April 6, 2023, after violating decorum rules. Incumbent re-elected August 3, 2023. (Note: Justin Jones was appointed as interim representative by the Nashville Metro Council on April 10.); Democratic hold.	▌ ✓ Justin Jones (Democratic) 77.7%; ▌Laura Nelson (Republican) 22.3%
House	86	Justin J. Pearson	Democratic	2023 (special)	Incumbent expelled April 6, 2023, after violating decorum rules. Incumbent re-elected August 3, 2023. (Note: Justin J. Pearson was appointed as interim representative by the Shelby County Board of Commissioners on April 12.); Democratic hold.	▌ ✓ Justin J. Pearson (Democratic) 94.0%; ▌Jeff Johnston (Independent) 6.0%
House	51	Bill Beck	Democratic	2014	Incumbent died June 4, 2023, of a heart attack. New member elected September 14, 2023. (Note: Anthony Davis was appointed as interim representative by the Nashville Metro Council on June 20.); Democratic hold.	▌ ✓ Aftyn Behn (Democratic) 75.6%; ▌David Hooven (Republican) 21.5%; ▌Annabelle Lee (Independent) 2.9%

=== Virginia ===
District		Incumbent			This race	
Chamber	No.	Representative	Party	First elected	Results	Candidates
House	24	Ronnie Campbell	Republican	2018 (special)	Incumbent died December 13, 2022, of cancer. New member elected January 10, 2023. Republican hold.	▌ ✓ Ellen Campbell (Republican) 62.5%; ▌Jade Harris (Democratic) 37.3%
House	35	Mark Keam	Democratic	2009	Incumbent resigned September 6, 2022, to become Deputy Assistant Secretary for Travel and Tourism within the International Trade Administration. New member elected January 10, 2023. Democratic hold.	▌ ✓ Holly Seibold (Democratic) 67.7%; ▌Monique Baroudi (Republican) 32.2%
Senate	7	Jen Kiggans	Republican	2019	Incumbent resigned November 15, 2022, to become a U.S. representative. New member elected January 10, 2023. Democratic gain.	▌ ✓ Aaron Rouse (Democratic) 50.8%; ▌Kevin Adams (Republican) 49.1%
Senate	9	Jennifer McClellan	Democratic	2017 (special)	Incumbent resigned March 7, 2023, to become a U.S. representative. New member elected March 28, 2023. Democratic hold.	▌ ✓ Lamont Bagby (Democratic) 89.8%; ▌ Stephen Imholt (Republican) 9.9%
House	6	Jeff Campbell	Republican	2013	Incumbent resigned July 14, 2023, to assume a judicial appointment. New member elected August 29, 2023. Republican hold.	▌ ✓ Jed Arnold (Republican) 80.9%; ▌Write-in 19.1%

=== Wisconsin ===
District		Incumbent			This race	
Chamber	No.	Representative	Party	First elected	Results	Candidates
Senate	8	Alberta Darling	Republican	1992	Incumbent resigned December 1, 2022, for personal reasons. New member elected April 4, 2023. Republican hold.	▌ ✓ Dan Knodl (Republican) 50.9%; ▌Jodi Habush Sinykin (Democratic) 49.1%
Assembly	24	Dan Knodl	Republican	2008	Incumbent resigned May 3, 2023, to join the State Senate. New member elected July 18, 2023. Republican hold.	▌ ✓ Paul Melotik (Republican) 53.7%; ▌Bob Tatterson (Democratic) 46.3%

== Recall elections ==
=== Oregon ===
District		Incumbent			This race	
Chamber	No.	Representative	Party	First elected	Results	Vote
House	8	Paul Holvey	Democratic	2004 (appointed)	Recall election failed October 3, 2023.	✗ No 90.0%; Yes 10.0%
