= 2023 Pennsylvania elections =

- November 7, 2023

Elections were held in Pennsylvania on November 7, 2023, to fill judicial positions, allow judicial retention votes, and fill numerous county, local and municipal offices, the most prominent being the mayor of Philadelphia. The necessary primary elections were held on May 16, 2023. In addition, special elections for legislative vacancies could be held at various times in 2023.

== Justice of the Supreme Court ==
2023 Pennsylvania Supreme Court election
- November 7, 2023

| Nominee | Daniel McCaffery | Carolyn Carluccio |
| Party | Democratic | Republican |
| Popular vote | 1,652,113 | 1,434,945 |
| Percentage | 53.52% | 46.48% |
- McCaffery: 50–60% 60–70% 70–80% 80–90% >90% Carluccio: 50–60% 60–70% 70–80% 80–90% >90%
Justice before election
Max Baer
Democratic
Elected Justice
Daniel McCaffery
Democratic

One vacancy occurred after Democratic Chief Justice Max Baer died on September 30, 2022.

=== Democratic primary ===
==== Candidates ====
- Deborah Kunselman, judge of the Superior Court of Pennsylvania
- Daniel McCaffery, judge of the Superior Court of Pennsylvania, U.S. Army veteran

==== Endorsements ====
Debbie Kunselman

Newspapers

- The Philadelphia Inquirer
Daniel McCaffery

Political parties

- Pennsylvania Democratic Party

Organizations

- Pennsylvania Conference of Teamsters

==== Fundraising ====
Campaign finance reports as of June 5, 2023
| Candidate | Raised | Spent | Cash on hand |
|---|---|---|---|
| Debbie Kunselman | $95,275 | $93,567 | $1,707 |
| Dan McCaffery | $776,572 | $483,510 | $408,881 |
Source: PA Department of State

==== Results ====
Primary results by county McCaffery: 50%–60%; 60%–70%; 70%–80%; 80%–90%; Kunselman: 50%–60%; 60%–70%; 70%–80%; 80%–90%; 90%–100%

Democratic primary results
| Party | Candidate | Votes | % |
|---|---|---|---|
| Democratic | Daniel D. McCaffery | 633,845 | 60.20% |
| Democratic | Deborah Anne Kunselman | 419,090 | 39.80% |
| Total votes | | 1,052,935 | 100.0% |

=== Republican primary ===
==== Candidates ====
- Carolyn Carluccio, judge of the Montgomery County Court of Common Pleas
- Patricia McCullough, judge of the Pennsylvania Commonwealth Court

===== Withdrawn =====
- Paula Patrick, judge of the Philadelphia County Court of Common Pleas

==== Endorsements ====
Carolyn Carluccio

Political parties

- Pennsylvania Republican Party

Newspapers

- The Philadelphia Inquirer (primary only)
Patricia McCullough

State legislators

- Doug Mastriano, state senator from the 33rd district (2019–present)

==== Fundraising ====
Campaign finance reports as of June 5, 2023
| Candidate | Raised | Spent | Cash on hand |
|---|---|---|---|
| Carolyn Carluccio | $547,164 | $439,446 | $107,718 |
| Patricia McCullough | $22,162 | $12,076 | $10,086 |
Source: PA Department of State

==== Results ====
Primary results by county Carluccio: 50%–60%; 60%–70%; 70%–80%; 80%–90%; McCullough: 50%–60%; 60%–70%

Republican primary results
| Party | Candidate | Votes | % |
|---|---|---|---|
| Republican | Carolyn Carluccio | 441,413 | 53.57% |
| Republican | Patricia McCullough | 382,512 | 46.43% |
| Total votes | | 823,925 | 100.0% |

=== General election ===
==== Endorsements ====
Dan McCaffery (D)

Federal officials

- Eric Holder, former U.S. attorney general (2009–2015)

Organizations

- Pennsylvania Fraternal Order of Police
- Pennsylvania State Corrections Officers Association
- Pennsylvania State Troopers Association
- Reproductive Freedom for All

Political parties

- Working Families Party

Newspapers

- The Philadelphia Inquirer
Carolyn Carluccio (R)

Organizations

- Commonwealth Partners Chamber of Entrepreneurs
- National Federation of Independent Business

==== Fundraising ====
Although McCaffery outraised Carluccio 2-to-1 in direct fundraising, Carluccio received over $4 million in independent expenditures supporting her campaign, primarily through Republican donor Jeff Yass. In comparison, McCaffery only received $330,000 in support from outside groups.

Campaign finance reports as of November 27, 2023
| Candidate | Raised | Spent | Cash on hand |
|---|---|---|---|
| Carolyn Carluccio (R) | $1,365,518 | $1,453,732 | $19,503 |
| Dan McCaffery (D) | $2,766,455 | $3,173,273 | $10,464 |
Source: PA Department of State

==== Polling ====
| Poll source | Date(s) administered | Sample size (Note: Key: A – all adults; RV – registered voters; LV – likely voters; V – unclear) | Margin of error | Daniel McCaffery (D) | Carolyn Carluccio (R) | Undecided |
|---|---|---|---|---|---|---|
| Common Ground (R) (Note: Poll sponsored by the Commonwealth Foundation, a conservative think tank.) | September 21–24, 2023 | 800 (RV) | ± 3.5% | 42% | 36% | 22% |

==== Results ====
2023 Pennsylvania Supreme Court election
| Party | Candidate | Votes | % |
|---|---|---|---|
| Democratic | Daniel D. McCaffery | 1,652,113 | 53.52% |
| Republican | Carolyn T. Carluccio | 1,434,945 | 46.48% |
| Total votes | | 3,087,058 | 100.0% |
| Democratic hold | | | |

== Judge of the Superior Court ==
2023 Pennsylvania Superior Court election
- November 7, 2023

2 seats of the Superior Court of Pennsylvania
| | Majority party | Minority party |
|---|---|---|
| Candidate | Jill Beck; Timika Lane | Maria Battista; Harry Smail Jr. |
| Party | Democratic | Republican |
| Last election | 7 | 8 |
| Seats won | 9 | 6 |
| Seat change | ▲2 | ▼2 |
| Popular vote | 3,003,573 | 2,605,372 |
| Percentage | 53.55% | 46.45% |
- County results Democrat: 50–60% 60–70% 80–90% Republican: 50–60% 60–70% 70–80% 80–90%

There were two seats up for election.

- A vacant seat on the court was up for election after the retirement of Judge Jacqueline Shogan in 2021.
- A second seat was scheduled for election due to the impending mandatory retirement of Judge Emeritus John T. Bender on December 31, 2023.

The election of Jill Beck and Timika Lane flipped the partisan makeup of the Superior Court, from a 8–7 Republican majority, to a 9–6 Democratic majority. However, the makeup was decreased to a 8–6 Democratic majority when Judge Dan McCaffery vacated his seat after being elected to the Pennsylvania Supreme Court.

=== Republican primary ===
==== Candidates ====
- Maria Battista, former counsel for the Pennsylvania Department of Health (2011–2014), former Venango County assistant district attorney (2004–2005)
- Harry Smail Jr., judge of the Westmoreland County Court of Common Pleas

===== Withdrawn =====
- Michael Dimino, professor at Widener University Commonwealth Law School
- Emily Yuhaniak, former law clerk for Judge John T. Bender

==== Endorsements ====
Maria Battista

Political parties

- Pennsylvania Republican Party
Harry Smail

Political parties

- Pennsylvania Republican Party

==== Results ====
Republican primary results (vote for not more than 2)
| Party | Candidate | Votes | % |
|---|---|---|---|
| Republican | Maria Battista | 626,159 | 52.89% |
| Republican | Harry Smail Jr. | 557,707 | 47.11% |
| Total votes | | 1,183,866 | 100.0% |

=== Democratic primary ===
==== Candidates ====
- Jill Beck, civil litigator, Blank Rome
- Patrick Dugan, judge of the Philadelphia Municipal Court
- Timika Lane, judge of the Philadelphia County Court of Common Pleas

==== Endorsements ====
Jill Beck (D)

Political parties

- Pennsylvania Democratic Party
Timika Lane (D)

Political parties

- Pennsylvania Democratic Party

==== Results ====
Democratic primary results (vote for not more than 2)
| Party | Candidate | Votes | % |
|---|---|---|---|
| Democratic | Jill Beck | 694,115 | 40.34% |
| Democratic | Timika Lane | 653,020 | 37.95% |
| Democratic | Patrick Dugan | 373,619 | 21.71% |
| Total votes | | 1,720,754 | 100.0% |

=== General election ===
==== Results ====
2023 Pennsylvania Superior Court election (vote for not more than 2)
| Party | Candidate | Votes | % |
|---|---|---|---|
| Democratic | Jill Beck | 1,572,023 | 28.03% |
| Democratic | Timika Lane | 1,431,550 | 25.52% |
| Republican | Maria Battista | 1,353,555 | 24.13% |
| Republican | Harry Smail Jr. | 1,251,817 | 22.32% |
| Total votes | | 5,608,945 | 100.0% |
| Democratic gain from Republican | | | |
| Democratic gain from Republican | | | |

== Judge of the Commonwealth Court ==
2023 Pennsylvania Commonwealth Court election
- November 7, 2023

| Nominee | Matt Wolf | Megan Martin |
| Party | Democratic | Republican |
| Popular vote | 1,602,116 | 1,452,330 |
| Percentage | 52.45% | 47.55% |
- County results Wolf: 50–60% 60–70% 80–90% Martin: 50–60% 60–70% 70–80% 80–90%
Judge before election
Kevin Brobson
Republican
Elected Judge
Matt Wolf
Democratic

There was one vacancy on the Commonwealth Court when Judge Kevin Brobson vacated his seat after being elected to the Pennsylvania Supreme Court in 2021.

=== Republican primary ===
==== Candidates ====
- Megan Martin, former aecretary-parliamentarian of the Pennsylvania State Senate (2012–2022)
- Joshua Prince, associate, Prince Law Offices, P.C., a law firm specializing in gun rights litigation

===== Endorsements =====
Megan Martin

Political parties

- Pennsylvania Republican Party

==== Results ====
Primary results by county Martin: 50%–60%; 60%–70%; 70%–80%; 80%–90%; Prince: 50%–60%; 60%–70%; 80%–90%

Republican primary results
| Party | Candidate | Votes | % |
|---|---|---|---|
| Republican | Megan Martin | 501,693 | 62.97% |
| Republican | Joshua Prince | 294,979 | 37.03% |
| Total votes | | 796,672 | 100.0% |

=== Democratic primary ===
==== Candidates ====
- Bryan Neft, commercial litigation attorney, former president of the Allegheny County Bar Association's Board of Governors
- Matthew S. Wolf, supervising judge of the Civil Division of the Philadelphia Municipal Court

===== Withdrawn =====
- Brandon Neuman, Judge of the Washington County Court of Common Pleas, former state representative (2011–2017)

==== Results ====
Primary results by county Wolf: 50%–60%; 60%–70%; 70%–80%; 80%–90%; 90%–100%; Neft: 50%–60%; 60%–70%; 70%–80%; 80%–90%

Democratic primary results
| Party | Candidate | Votes | % |
|---|---|---|---|
| Democratic | Matthew S. Wolf | 577,470 | 57.23% |
| Democratic | Bryan Neft | 431,595 | 42.77% |
| Total votes | | 1,009,065 | 100.0% |

=== General election ===
==== Results ====
2023 Pennsylvania Commonwealth Court election
| Party | Candidate | Votes | % |
|---|---|---|---|
| Democratic | Matthew S. Wolf | 1,602,116 | 52.45% |
| Republican | Megan Martin | 1,452,330 | 47.55% |
| Total votes | | 3,054,446 | 100.0% |
| Democratic gain from Republican | | | |

== Judicial retention ==
=== Superior Court ===
President Judge Jack A. Panella (D) and Judge Victor P. Stabile (R) were scheduled for retention votes in 2023. Both informed the Pennsylvania Department of State that they would seek retention.

President Judge Jack A. Panella (D) retention, 2023
| Choice | Votes | % |
|---|---|---|
| For | 1,778,318 | 67.29 |
| Against | 864,594 | 32.71 |
| Total | 2,642,912 | 100.00 |
Source: PA Department of State

Judge Victor P. Stabile (R) retention, 2023
| Choice | Votes | % |
|---|---|---|
| For | 1,577,550 | 61.08 |
| Against | 1,005,336 | 38.92 |
| Total | 2,582,886 | 100.00 |
Source: PA Department of State

== Municipal elections ==
=== Allegheny County ===
==== District attorney ====
===== Democratic primary =====
====== Declared ======
- Matt Dugan, chief public defender of Allegheny County (2019–present)
- Stephen Zappala, incumbent district attorney (1998–present)

===== Endorsements =====
Matt Dugan

Organizations

- Allegheny County Democratic Committee
- Pennsylvania Working Families Party

===== Results =====
2023 Allegheny County district attorney election, Democratic primary
| Party | Candidate | Votes | % |
|---|---|---|---|
| Democratic | Matt Dugan | 94,974 | 55.62% |
| Democratic | Stephen Zappala (incumbent) | 75,575 | 44.26% |
| Write-in | | 196 | 0.11% |
| Total votes | | 170,745 | 100% |

===== Results =====
Incumbent Stephen Zappala accepted the Republican nomination upon losing the Democratic primary, though he remained a registered Democrat.

2023 Allegheny County District Attorney election
| Party | Candidate | Votes | % |
|---|---|---|---|
| Republican | Stephen Zappala (incumbent) | 188,215 | 51.54 |
| Democratic | Matt Dugan | 176,559 | 48.35 |
| Write-in | | 376 | 0.10 |
| Total votes | | 365,150 | 100.00 |

== Special elections ==
=== Pennsylvania State Senate ===
==== 27th senatorial district ====
On November 28, 2022, state senator John Gordner announced his resignation in order to serve as counsel to interim Senate Pro Tempore Kim Ward. His resignation was effective on November 30. A special election to replace Gordner was held on January 31, 2023.

Democrats nominated speech pathologist Patricia Lawton while Republicans nominated State Representative Lynda Schlegel-Culver. Libertarians had nominated business consultant and constable Thomas Anderson, but he failed to file the necessary paperwork in time and his lawsuit for ballot access was denied by the Commonwealth Court of Pennsylvania.

2023 Pennsylvania Senate, District 27 special election
| Party | Candidate | Votes | % |
|---|---|---|---|
| Republican | Lynda Schlegel-Culver | 24,462 | 69.68 |
| Democratic | Patricia Lawton | 10,643 | 30.32 |
| Total votes | | 35,105 | 100.00 |
| Republican hold | | | |

=== Pennsylvania House of Representatives ===
Three vacancies in the Pennsylvania House of Representatives opened between Election Day 2022 and the start of the 2023 session in January. The vacancies made the difference between Democratic and Republican control, and paralyzed the chamber due to representatives' inability to agree on basic operating rules.

==== 32nd district ====
2023 Pennsylvania's 32nd House of Representatives district special election
- February 7, 2023

Pennsylvania's 32nd House of Representatives district
| Candidate | Joe McAndrew | Clay Walker |
| Party | Democratic | Republican |
| Popular vote | 9,601 | 3,195 |
| Percentage | 74.63% | 24.84% |
- Precinct results McAndrew: 50–60% 60–70% 70–80% 80–90% >90% Walker: 50–60%
State representative before election
Tony DeLuca
Democratic
Elected State representative
Joe McAndrew
Democratic

On October 9, 2022, incumbent representative Anthony DeLuca died of lymphoma while seeking reelection. His death occurred after the deadline to conduct candidate substitutions, causing his name to remain on the ballot. Despite his death, he defeated Green challenger Queonia Livingston, receiving 85% of the vote. A special election to replace DeLuca was held on February 7, 2023.

Democrats nominated Penn Hills Democratic Committee chair Joe McAndrew. Republicans nominated pastor and Army veteran Clay Walker. 2022 Green Party candidate Queonia Livingston had filed nomination papers, but they were rejected by the Pennsylvania Department of State.

2023 Pennsylvania House of Representatives, District 32 special election
| Party | Candidate | Votes | % |
|---|---|---|---|
| Democratic | Joe McAndrew | 9,601 | 74.63 |
| Republican | Clay Walker | 3,195 | 24.84 |
| Write-in | | 68 | 0.53 |
| Total votes | | 12,864 | 100.00 |
| Democratic hold | | | |

==== 34th district ====
2023 Pennsylvania's 34th House of Representatives district special election
- February 7, 2023

Pennsylvania's 34th House of Representatives district
| Candidate | Abigail Salisbury | Robert Pagane |
| Party | Democratic | Republican |
| Popular vote | 10,282 | 1,416 |
| Percentage | 87.60% | 12.06% |
- Precinct results Salisbury: 50–60% 60–70% 70–80% 80–90% >90%
State representative before election
Summer Lee
Democratic
Elected State representative
Abigail Salisbury
Democratic

On November 8, 2022, incumbent representative Summer Lee was elected to the U.S. House of Representatives in Pennsylvania's 12th congressional district, while simultaneously running unopposed for reelection to the 34th legislative district. Pennsylvania's constitution forbids General Assembly lawmakers from holding another office, but does not prevent them from running for reelection while seeking another office. A special election to replace Lee was held on February 7, 2023.

Democrats nominated Swissvale Borough Councilor Abigail Salisbury, while Republicans nominated Robert Pagane, a kickboxing instructor.

Abigail Salisbury (D)

Organizations

- EMILY's List

2023 Pennsylvania House of Representatives, District 34 special election
| Party | Candidate | Votes | % |
|---|---|---|---|
| Democratic | Abigail Salisbury | 10,282 | 87.60 |
| Republican | Robert Pagane | 1,416 | 12.06 |
| Write-in | | 39 | 0.33 |
| Total votes | | 11,737 | 100.00 |
| Democratic hold | | | |

==== 35th district ====
2023 Pennsylvania's 35th House of Representatives district special election
- February 7, 2023

Pennsylvania's 35th House of Representatives district
| Candidate | Matt Gergely | Don Nevills |
| Party | Democratic | Republican |
| Popular vote | 6,790 | 2,302 |
| Percentage | 73.66% | 24.97% |
- Precinct results Gergely: 50–60% 60–70% 70–80% 80–90% >90% Nevills: 50–60%
State representative before election
Austin Davis
Democratic
Elected State representative
Matt Gergely
Democratic

On January 4, 2022, incumbent representative Austin Davis announced he would be seeking the Democratic nomination for lieutenant governor, with Josh Shapiro's endorsement. He was nominated to be on the ticket on May 18 and was elected to the position in the general election. Davis was subsequently reelected to represent the 35th district, defeating Republican challenger Donald Nevills with 65% of the vote. Pennsylvania's constitution forbids General Assembly lawmakers from holding another office, but does not prevent them from running for reelection while seeking another office. A special election to replace Davis was held on February 7, 2023.

Democrats nominated McKeesport official Matt Gergely, brother of previous seatholder Marc Gergely. Republicans nominated their 2022 general election nominee Don Nevills.

Matt Gergely (D)

Organizations

Planned Parenthood PA PAC

2023 Pennsylvania House of Representatives, District 35 special election
| Party | Candidate | Votes | % |
|---|---|---|---|
| Democratic | Matt Gergely | 6,790 | 73.66 |
| Republican | Don Nevills | 2,302 | 24.97 |
| Write-in | | 126 | 1.37 |
| Total votes | | 9,218 | 100.00 |
| Democratic hold | | | |

==== 108th district ====
2023 Pennsylvania's 108th House of Representatives district special election
- May 16, 2023

Pennsylvania's 108th House of Representatives district
| Candidate | Mike Stender | Trevor Finn |
| Party | Republican | Democratic |
| Popular vote | 6,600 | 4,318 |
| Percentage | 58.3% | 38.2% |
- Precinct results Stender: 50–60% 60–70% 70–80% 80–90% Finn: 50–60% 60–70% 70–80% 80–90%
State representative before election
Lynda Schlegel-Culver
Republican
Elected State representative
Mike Stender
Republican

On January 31, 2023, incumbent representative Lynda Schlegel-Culver was elected to Pennsylvania's 27th senatorial district in a special election amid the resignation of Senator John Gordner. House Speaker Joanna McClinton announced a special election for May 16 in conjunction with the 2023 primary.

Republicans nominated Shikellamy School Board member Mike Stender, while Democrats nominated Montour County Commissioner Trevor Finn. Libertarians nominated Marine Corps veteran Elijah Scretching.

2023 Pennsylvania House of Representatives, District 108 special election
| Party | Candidate | Votes | % |
|---|---|---|---|
| Republican | Mike Stender | 6,600 | 58.35 |
| Democratic | Trevor Finn | 4,318 | 38.18 |
| Libertarian | Elijah Scretching | 393 | 3.47 |
| Total votes | | 11,311 | 100.00 |
| Republican hold | | | |

==== 163rd district ====
2023 Pennsylvania's 163rd House of Representatives district special election

Pennsylvania's 163rd House of Representatives district
| Candidate | Heather Boyd | Kathleen Ford |
| Party | Democratic | Republican |
| Popular vote | 9,415 | 6,040 |
| Percentage | 60.2% | 38.6% |
State representative before election
Michael Zabel
Democratic
Elected State representative
Heather Boyd
Democratic

On March 8, 2023, incumbent representative Michael Zabel resigned from the Pennsylvania House of Representatives, effective March 16, following a sexual harassment controversy. House Speaker Joanna McClinton announced a special election for May 16 in conjunction with the 2023 primary.

Democrats nominated Heather Boyd, a senior staffer to Congresswoman Mary Gay Scanlon and former Upper Darby School Board member. Republicans nominated Kathleen "Katie" Ford, an Army veteran and special education therapist. Libertarians nominated Alfe Goodwin, a retired Philadelphia Police officer and nominee for this district in 2022.

2023 Pennsylvania House of Representatives, District 163 special election
| Party | Candidate | Votes | % |
|---|---|---|---|
| Democratic | Heather Boyd | 9,415 | 60.16 |
| Republican | Kathleen Ford | 6,040 | 38.60 |
| Libertarian | Alfe Goodwin | 194 | 1.24 |
| Total votes | | 15,649 | 100.00 |
| Democratic hold | | | |

==== 21st district ====
2023 Pennsylvania's 21st House of Representatives district special election

Pennsylvania's 21st House of Representatives district
| Candidate | Lindsay Powell | Erin Connolly Autenreith |
| Party | Democratic | Republican |
| Popular vote | 7,318 | 3,848 |
| Percentage | 65.54% | 34.46% |
State representative before election
Sara Innamorato
Democratic
Elected State representative
Lindsay Powell
Democratic

On July 19, 2023, incumbent representative Sara Innamorato resigned from the Pennsylvania House of Representatives after becoming the Democratic nominee for Allegheny County executive. House Speaker Joanna McClinton announced a special election for September 19.

Democrats nominated Lindsay Powell, a nonprofit executive, while Republicans nominated Erin Connolly Autenreith, a realtor and local Republican Party chair.

2023 Pennsylvania House of Representatives, District 21 special election
| Party | Candidate | Votes | % |
|---|---|---|---|
| Democratic | Lindsay Powell | 7,318 | 65.54 |
| Republican | Erin Autenreith | 3,848 | 34.46 |
| Total votes | | 11,166 | 100.0 |
| Democratic hold | | | |
