= 2023 Georgia state elections =

2023 Georgia elections
- November 7, 2023

Several elections took place in the U.S. state of Georgia in 2023. The municipal general election was held on November 7, 2023.

== State legislative special elections ==
=== House District 7 special election ===
A special election was held on January 3 for House District 7 to succeed House Speaker David Ralston (R) following his death on November 16, 2022. All five candidates who qualified were Republicans. Sheree Ralston and Johnny Chastain advanced to the runoff on January 31, with Chastain defeating Ralston.

=== House District 119 special election ===
A special election was held on January 31 for House District 119. The seat became vacant after representative-elect Danny Rampey (R) indicated his intention to resign after being sworn in on January 9, 2023.

- Holt Persinger (R, won)
- Charles Chase III (R, defeated in runoff)
- Bill Ritter (R)
- Renee Lord (R)
- Shelbey Diamond Alexander (D)
- Joseph Grodzicki (R)
- Joe Price (R)

=== Senate District 11 special election ===
A special election was held on January 31 for Senate District 11. Incumbent Dean Burke (R) resigned from the Georgia State Senate on December 30, 2022, to become chief medical officer at the Georgia Department of Community Health. Republican Sam Watson won outright, defeating Democrat Mary Weaver-Anderson and Libertarian John Monds.

=== House District 172 special election ===
A special election was held on January 31 for House District 172 after Sam Watson (R) resigned to run for Senate District 11. Republican Charles Cannon won the special election without opposition.

=== House District 75 special election ===
A special election was held on March 21 for House District 75 after Mike Glanton (D) resigned. Democrat Eric Bell II won outright, defeating Democrat Herman "Drew" Andrews and Republican Della Ashley.

=== House District 68 special election ===
A special election was held on May 16 for House District 68 following the death of Tish Naghise (D). Democrat Derrick Jackson defeated Democrat Mark Baker to win.

== Local elections ==
=== School boards ===
- Five seats on the Atlanta Public Schools Board were up for election.
- A seat on the Muscogee County School District Board was up for a special election.
