= Pieh =

Pieh is a surname. Notable people with the surname include:

- Cy Pieh (1886–1945), American baseball pitcher
- Wendy Pieh, American politician
