= Franklin Kury =

American politician (1936–2026)

Franklin L. Kury

Member of the Pennsylvania Senate from the 27th district
- In office 1973–1980
- Preceded by: Preston B. Davis
- Succeeded by: Edward Helfrick

Member of the Pennsylvania House of Representatives from the 108th district
- In office 1969–1972
- Preceded by: District created
- Succeeded by: George O. Wagner

Member of the Pennsylvania House of Representatives from the Northumberland County district
- In office 1967–1968

Personal details
- Born: October 15, 1936 Sunbury, Pennsylvania, U.S.
- Died: August 16, 2026 (aged 89)

Franklin Leo Kury (October 15, 1936 – August 16, 2026) was an American politician who was a member of the Pennsylvania State Senate, serving from 1973 to 1980. He also served in the Pennsylvania House of Representatives from 1966 to 1972.

Kury was known primarily for being the author of the environmental rights amendment found in Article 1, Section 27, of the Pennsylvania Constitution.

Kury died on August 16, 2026, at the age of 89.
