= Phyliss =

The name Phyliss may refer to:

- Phyllis Latour
- Phyliss Kernick
- Phyliss J. Anderson
