= Joe McAndrew =

Joe McAndrew may refer to:

- Joe McAndrew (rally driver), a New Zealand rally driver
- Joe McAndrew (politician), a member of the Pennsylvania House of Representatives
