= Abden Simmons =

American politician

Member of the Maine House of Representatives
- Incumbent
- Assumed office June 14, 2023
- Preceded by: Clinton Collamore
- Constituency: 45th district
- In office December 7, 2016 – December 5, 2018
- Preceded by: Jeffrey Evangelos
- Succeeded by: Jeffrey Evangelos
- Constituency: 91st district

Personal details
- Party: Republican

Abden Simmons is an American politician from the state of Maine. A member of the Republican Party, he serves in the Maine House of Representatives representing the 45th district since 2023. He previously served a single term representing the 91st district from 2016 to 2018.

== Career ==
Simmons was elected to the Maine House in 2016, filling the seat of retiring independent Jeffrey Evangelos. Evangelos returned to challenge Simmons for re-election in 2018 and won. Simmons ran for Maine Senate in 2022 in the 13th district, but lost by a 9.4% margin. He is now a member of the Waldoboro select board. On March 29, 2023, officials of the Maine Republican Party nominated Simmons for the upcoming special election in Maine's 45th House of Representatives district. He won the special election in June 2023.

== Electoral history ==
=== 2023 Maine House of Representatives District 45 special election ===
2023 Special Election, District 45
Party	Candidate	Votes	%
Republican	Abden Simmons	1,423	52.22%
Democratic	Wendy Pieh	1,313	47.78%
Total votes		2,748	100.00%
Republican gain from Democratic			

=== 2022 Maine State Senate District 13 election ===
2022 Election, District 13
Party	Candidate	Votes	%
Democratic	Cameron Reny	11,970	54.70%
Republican	Abden Simmons	9,913	45.30%
Total votes		21,883	100.00%
Democratic hold			

=== 2018 Maine House of Representatives District 91 election ===
2018 Election, District 91
Party	Candidate	Votes	%
Independent	Jeffrey Evangelos	2,168	51.58%
Republican	Abden Simmons	2,035	48.42%
Total votes		4,203	100.00%
Independent gain from Republican			

=== 2016 Maine House of Representatives District 91 election ===
2016 Election, District 91
Party	Candidate	Votes	%
Republican	Abden Simmons	2,721	54.67%
Democratic	Emily Trask-Eaton	2,256	45.33%
Total votes		4,977	100.00%
Republican gain from Independent			

Maine House of Representatives
Preceded by Jeffrey Evangelos	Member of the Maine House of Representatives from the 91st district 2016–2018	Succeeded by Jeffrey Evangelos
Preceded by Clinton Collamore	Member of the Maine House of Representatives from the 45th district 2023–present	Incumbent
