= Merle Phillips =

American politician

Merle H. Phillips

Northumberland County Commissioner
- In office November 24, 2010 – January 3, 2012
- Preceded by: Kurt Masser
- Succeeded by: Rick Shoch

Member of the Pennsylvania House of Representatives from the 108th district
- In office April 8, 1980 – January 4, 2011
- Preceded by: George O. Wagner
- Succeeded by: Lynda Schlegel Culver

Personal details
- Born: September 21, 1928 Dalmatia, Pennsylvania
- Died: December 30, 2013 (aged 85) Sunbury, Pennsylvania
- Party: Republican
- Spouse: Helen Heckert
- Education: Susquehanna University

Military service
- Allegiance: United States
- Branch/service: United States Marine Corps
- Years of service: 1951 — 1957

Merle H. Phillips (September 21, 1928 – December 30, 2013) was a Republican member of the Pennsylvania House of Representatives for the 108th District from 1980 until retiring in 2010. He also was appointed as Northumberland County Commissioner in 2010 to finish Kurt Masser's term after the position was vacated when Masser was elected to the 107th District.

== Career ==
Prior to his election to the State House, Phillips was the president of Irish Valley Food Processing. He served in the United States Marine Corps for four and a half years active duty and two years in the Reserves.

Phillips ended his term serving in House Leadership as Republican Caucus Administrator. Previously, he has served as Republican Chairman and Vice Chairman of the Game and Fisheries Committee and Secretary of the Agricultural and Rural Affairs Committee, as well as serving as a member of the Transportation and Appropriations Committees.

On January 15, 2010, Phillips announced he would not be seeking reelection. Since retiring from the state House of Representatives he has been appointed to fill a vacancy as a commissioner of Northumberland County in November 2010.

On November 8, 2011, Phillips only captured 17% of the vote for Northumberland County Commissioner. He was succeeded by Republican Rick Shoch.

== Personal ==
Representative Phillips resided in Upper Augusta Township. He and his wife had five children.

Merle Phillips died on December 30, 2013.
