= Zion Stone Church =

Historic church in Rockefeller Township, Pennsylvania, United States

- U.S. National Register of Historic Places
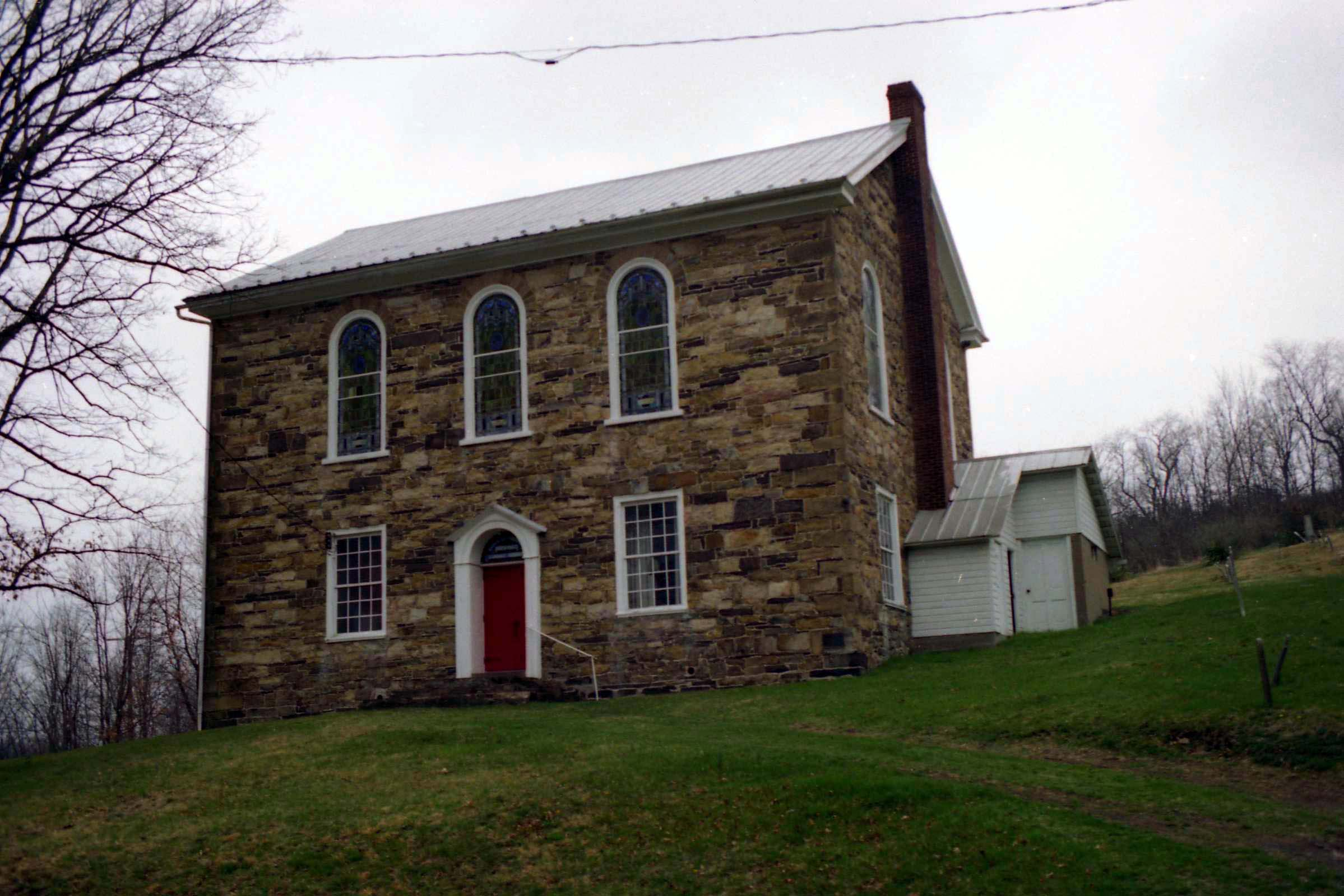

- Location within Pennsylvania Location within the United States
- Location: Tulpehocken Road in Augustaville, Rockefeller Township, Pennsylvania
- Coordinates: 40°48′26″N 76°43′7″W
- Area: 2.5 acres (1.0 ha)
- Built: 1814-1816
- Architects: Speer, Henry
- NRHP reference No.: 84000267
- Added to NRHP: November 1, 1984

Zion Stone Church, also known as Cornerstone Calvary Fellowship Inc., Augustaville, is a historic Lutheran and Reformed church on Tulpehocken Road in the hamlet of Augustaville, Rockefeller Township, Northumberland County, Pennsylvania. It was built between 1814 and 1816, and is a two-story, reddish-brown stone building with an addition added in 2016 (not in picture). It is an example of early-19th century Germanic style architecture. It was originally a one-story building; the second floor was added in 1861. Major repairs occurred in 1883, 1930, and 1936. Adjacent to the church is a cemetery with burials dating to 1793.

It was added to the National Register of Historic Places in 1984.
