= Jeffrey Evangelos =

American politician (1952–2026)

Member of the Maine House of Representatives from the 91st district
- In office December 5, 2018 – December 7, 2022
- Preceded by: Abden Simmons
- Succeeded by: Clinton Collamore
- In office December 3, 2014 – December 7, 2016
- Preceded by: Jarrod Crockett
- Succeeded by: Abden Simmons

Member of the Maine House of Representatives from the 49th district
- In office December 5, 2012 – December 3, 2014
- Preceded by: Wesley Richardson
- Succeeded by: Mattie Daughtry

Personal details
- Born: November 3, 1952 Concord, Massachusetts, U.S.
- Died: February 11, 2026 (aged 73) Friendship, Maine, U.S.
- Party: Unenrolled (2005–); Democratic (before 2005)
- Education: SUNY Brockport (B.S.); University of Maine (M.A.)
- Profession: Town Manager

Jeffrey P. Evangelos (November 3, 1952 – February 11, 2026) was an American politician from Maine. Evangelos was an unenrolled (independent) member of the Maine House of Representatives, serving four two-year terms in the Maine House of Representatives between 2012 and 2022. He was noted for his willingness to criticize both Democrats and Republicans, and for his advocacy for criminal justice reform.

== Early life ==
Evangelos was born in Concord, Massachusetts, on November 3, 1952. He earned a B.S. in economics and history from Brockport State College in Brockport, New York. Afterwards, he moved to Maine and attended the University of Maine, where he earned a M.A. in history. He then began working in the public sector, including work in rural Washington County, Maine in municipal government. He was then hired as town manager in Warren, Maine, in 1976 at the age of 23.

== Politics ==
In 2004, Evangelos was a Democratic candidate for the Maine House of Representatives in District 49. He lost to Republican Wesley Richardson by 115 votes.

Evangelos was elected in November 2012 to represent District 49, which includes the towns of Cushing, Union, Warren, and his residence in Friendship, all of which are in Knox County. He ran against a Republican in a two-way race and won with 55% of the vote. During the campaign, a conservative PAC sent out mailers criticizing Evangelos for his positions on former president George W. Bush. He was re-elected in 2014 in what was now the 91st district, but did not seek re-election in 2016. The seat flipped to Republican Abden Simmons.

Evangelos returned to politics and challenged Simmons in 2018, and defeated him by 133 votes to win the seat back. He was re-elected in 2020, but chose not to run for re-election in 2022 as he had been diagnosed with prostate cancer and leukemia. He was succeeded by Democrat Clinton Collamore.

In November 2013, Evangelos endorsed Democratic Congressman Mike Michaud in the 2014 gubernatorial election.

In 2016, Evangelos co-sponsored an impeachment measure against Republican governor Paul LePage, which failed. Later that year, Evangelos attempted to have LePage removed from his position, alleging that the governor was not mentally fit enough to serve. This effort also failed.

In 2022, Evangelos was hospitalized in the intensive care unit at Damariscotta's LincolnHealth Hospital. While hospitalized, Evangelos continued to work on cases for his constituents.

== Death ==
Evangelos died on February 11, 2026, at the age of 73 following a prolonged battle with prostate cancer.
