= Georgia's 172nd House of Representatives district =

State district in Georgia, USA

Georgia's 172nd State House of Representatives district
Representative
Charles Cannon; R–Moultrie
- Demographics: 53.9% White; 27.2% Black; 16.4% Hispanic; 1.1% Asian
- Population: 52,563

District 172 elects one member of the Georgia House of Representatives. It contains the entirety of Colquitt County and Cook County, as well as parts of Thomas County.

== Members ==
- Sam Watson (2013–2022)
- Charles Cannon (since 2023)
