= Tony DeLuca (politician) =

American politician (1937–2022)

Anthony M. DeLuca
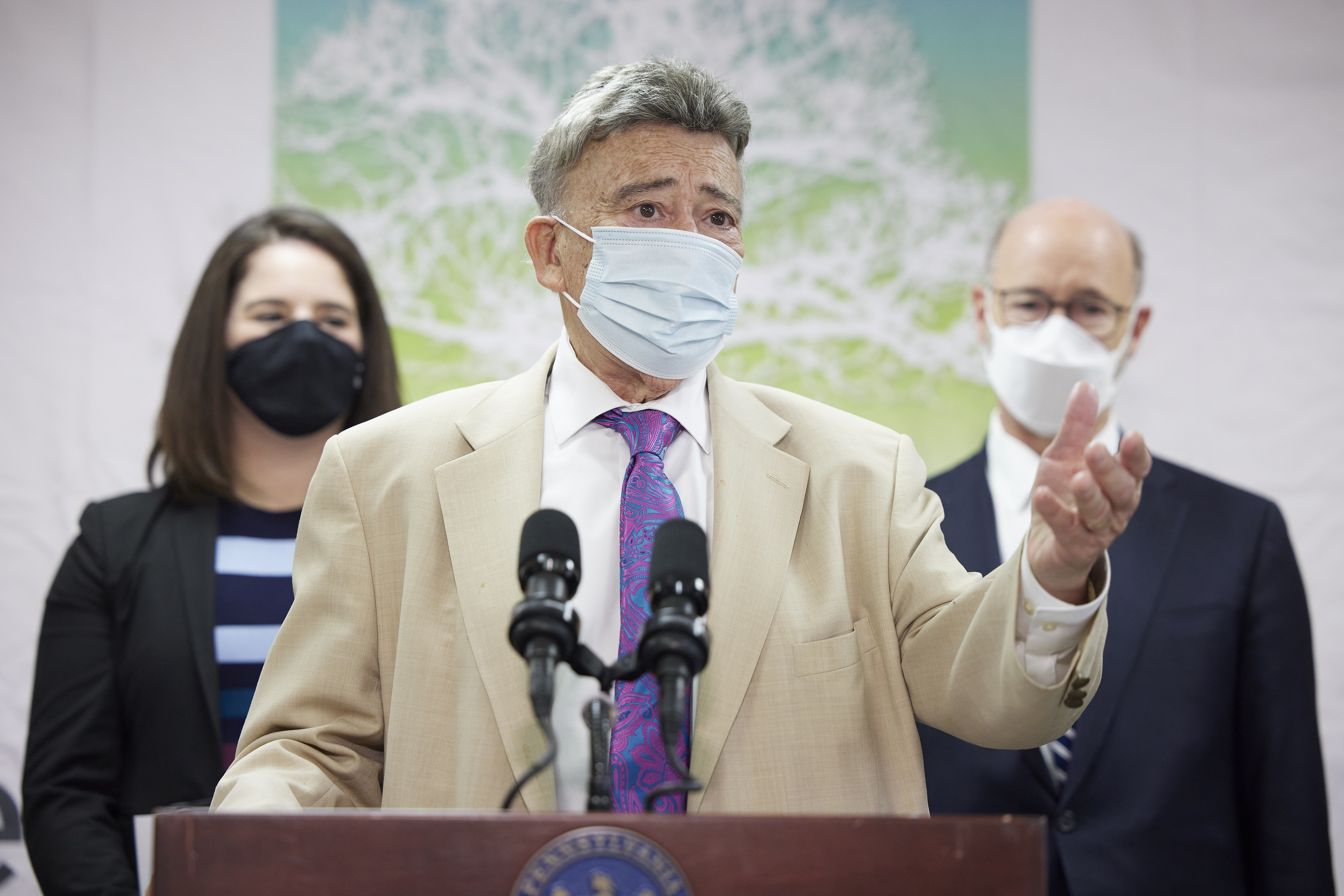
- DeLuca speaks with the press in 2022

Member of the Pennsylvania House of Representatives from the 32nd district
- In office January 4, 1983 – October 9, 2022
- Preceded by: Albert Rasco
- Succeeded by: Joe McAndrew

Personal details
- Born: June 3, 1937 Pittsburgh, Pennsylvania, U.S.
- Died: October 9, 2022 (aged 85) Penn Hills, Pennsylvania, U.S.
- Party: Democratic
- Spouse: Constance (died 2021)
- Children: 4
- Education: Community College of Allegheny County

Anthony M. DeLuca Sr. (June 3, 1937 – October 9, 2022) was an American politician of the Democratic Party. A longtime resident of the Pittsburgh suburb of Penn Hills, he was a member of the Pennsylvania House of Representatives for the 32nd District from 1983 until his death. Before being elected to the state legislature, he served on the Penn Hills City Council and was the town's deputy mayor.

== Early life ==
DeLuca was born on June 3, 1937, in the East Liberty neighborhood of Pittsburgh. He graduated from Westinghouse High School and Community College of Allegheny County. DeLuca became a co-owner of DeLuca's Market in East Liberty, which was opened by his father. DeLuca moved to Penn Hills in 1952.

== Career ==
In 1975, DeLuca was elected to the city council of Penn Hills, Pennsylvania. The city council elected DeLuca to become the deputy mayor in 1978.

DeLuca ran for mayor of Penn Hills against Phyllis Kernick in the election in 1979, but lost the election. DeLuca ran in a special election in March 1980 for Pennsylvania's 32nd Representative District in the Pennsylvania House of Representatives, seeking to fill the remainder of Kernick's term, which she resigned when becoming mayor. He lost the election to Republican Albert Rasco.

In the 1982 general election, DeLuca ran again for the 32nd district in the Pennsylvania House, and he defeated Rasco in a rematch. Rasco challenged DeLuca again in 1984, and DeLuca won reelection.

DeLuca won election to the Pennsylvania House for 20 terms. At the time of his death, he was the longest serving member of the Pennsylvania House. He was the top Democratic member on the House Insurance Committee for 20 years. In 2022, DeLuca was reelected posthumously, triggering a special election.

== Personal life and death ==
DeLuca was inducted into Westinghouse High School's hall of fame in 1996.

DeLuca and his wife, Constance, were married for 66 years until her death in 2021, and they had four children. Their son, Anthony Jr., was elected to serve as mayor of Penn Hills and as a magistrate judge.

DeLuca died from lymphoma at his home on October 9, 2022, at the age of 85.
