= Dana Dow =

American politician

Minority Leader of the Maine Senate
- In office December 5, 2018 – December 2, 2020
- Preceded by: Troy Jackson
- Succeeded by: Jeff Timberlake

Member of the Maine Senate from the 13th district
- In office December 7, 2016 – December 2, 2020
- Preceded by: Chris Johnson
- Succeeded by: Chloe Maxmin

Member of the Maine House of Representatives from the 50th district
- In office December 1, 2010 – December 5, 2012
- Preceded by: Wendy Pieh
- Succeeded by: Ellen A. Winchenbach

Member of the Maine Senate from the 20th district
- In office December 1, 2004 – December 3, 2008
- Preceded by: Kenneth Blais
- Succeeded by: David Trahan

Personal details
- Party: Republican
- Spouse: Lisa Dow
- Education: University of Southern Maine (BA)

Dana L. Dow is an American politician from Maine. Dow served as a Republican State Senator from Maine's 20th District, where he represented most of Lincoln County, including his residence in Waldoboro. He graduated from the first class of Medomak Valley High School in 1969. He graduated from the University of Southern Maine. He was first elected to the Maine State Senate in 2004. He served a term (2010–12) in the Maine House of Representatives.

In February 2012, Dow sought his old Senate seat following the resignation of David Trahan. He was defeated by Chris Johnson.

He lives in Waldoboro, Maine.

Dana Dow was re-elected to the Maine State Senate in 2016, by defeating incumbent Senator Chris Johnson. After his reelection in 2018, he was chosen by the Republican senate caucus to be Senate Minority Leader.

He was defeated by then state Representative Chloe Maxmin in November 2020.

Maine Senate
Preceded by Troy Jackson	Minority Leader of the Maine Senate; 2018–2020	Succeeded by Jeff Timberlake
