= John Bulloch (politician) =

American politician (born 1947)

Member of the Georgia Senate from the 11th district
- In office January 13, 2003 – December 6, 2012
- Succeeded by: Dean Burke

Member of the Georgia House of Representatives from the 180th district
- In office January 11, 1999 – January 13, 2003
- Preceded by: Theo Titus
- Succeeded by: Cecily Hill

Personal details
- Born: March 19, 1947 (age 79) Thomas County, Georgia
- Party: Republican
- Profession: Farmer

John Bulloch (born March 19, 1947) was a Republican member of the Georgia General Assembly. He was first elected in 1998 to represent the 180th district in the Georgia House of Representatives. After serving four years in the lower chamber, Bulloch was elected in 2002 to the 11th district of the Georgia State Senate. He resigned on December 6, 2012. Bulloch and his wife, Miriam, have three daughters: Dee, Joni, and Ashley.

== Early life ==
Bulloch attended elementary and secondary school in Thomas County where he grew up. Upon graduation, he attended Abraham Baldwin College in Tifton, GA for two years where he majored in agriculture. He is a fourth generation farmer and the current owner of Bulloch Farms, where he grows and harvests pecans and row crops.

Prior to being elected to the Georgia State Senate, Bulloch was a member of the Georgia House of Representatives.

== Georgia State Senate ==
Bulloch served as chairman of the Agriculture and Consumer Affairs Committee and as vice chairman of the Natural Resources and the Environment Committee. He also belonged to the Appropriations and Rules committees and was an ex officio member of the Banking and Financial Institutions Committee.
