= Edward Helfrick =

American politician (1928–2021)

Member of the Pennsylvania Senate from the 27th district
- In office January 4, 1981 – August 22, 2003
- Preceded by: Franklin L. Kury
- Succeeded by: John R. Gordner

Member of the Pennsylvania House of Representatives from the 107th district
- In office January 4, 1977 – November 30, 1980
- Preceded by: Joseph P. Bradley, Jr.
- Succeeded by: Robert E. Belfanti, Jr.

Personal details
- Born: March 11, 1928 Pottsville, Pennsylvania
- Died: September 28, 2021 (aged 93) Danville, Pennsylvania
- Party: Republican
- Spouse: Rosemarie Ciokajlo

Edward W. Helfrick (March 11, 1928 – September 28, 2021) was a Republican member of the Pennsylvania State Senate. He also served in the Pennsylvania House of Representatives from 1977 to 1980.

Helfrick died on September 28, 2021, at the age of 93.
