= David Trahan =

American politician

Member of the Maine Senate from the 20th district
- In office December 3, 2008 – January 4, 2012
- Preceded by: Dana Dow
- Succeeded by: Chris Johnson

Personal details
- Born: February 25, 1963 (age 63)
- Party: Republican
- Spouse: Pamela Trahan
- Profession: Logger / Lobbyist

A. David Trahan (born February 25, 1963) is an American politician, logger, and lobbyist. Trahan was a Republican State Senator from Maine's 20th District, representing much of Lincoln County, including his residence in Waldoboro. He graduated from the University of Maine at Augusta. He served in the Maine House of Representatives from 1998 to 2006.

In October 2011, Trahan took over as the executive director of the Sportsman's Alliance of Maine, a position which involved lobbying government officials. State regulations did not force Trahan to resign from his post in the Senate upon registering as lobbyist and Trahan chose not to resign until January. This forced the 21 towns in District 20 to hold a special election in early 2012, instead of having it on Election Day in November 2011, costing each town hundreds of dollars.

Upon the resumption of the Maine legislature on January 4, 2012, Trahan officially submitted his letter of resignation to Senate President Kevin Raye. In the special election to replace Trahan, Chris Johnson of Somerville defeated Republican State Representative Dana Dow to fill the remaining term.
