= Lynda Schlegel Culver =

American politician

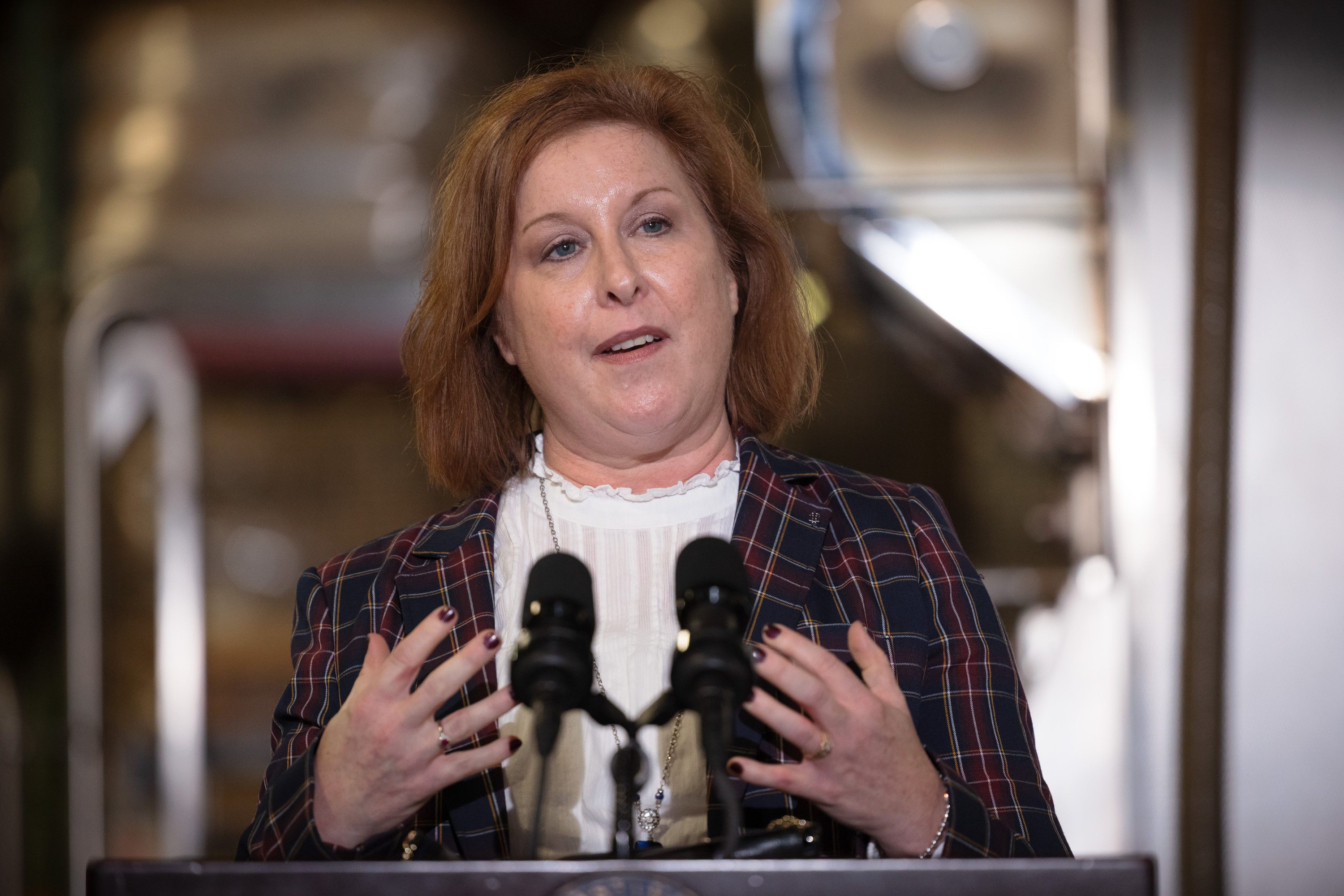

Member of the Pennsylvania Senate from the 27th district
- Incumbent
- Assumed office February 28, 2023
- Preceded by: John Gordner

Member of the Pennsylvania House of Representatives from the 108th district
- In office January 4, 2011 – February 28, 2023
- Preceded by: Merle Phillips
- Succeeded by: Mike Stender

Personal details
- Born: May 28, 1969 (age 57) Sunbury, Pennsylvania, U.S.
- Party: Republican
- Spouse: Thomas
- Children: 1
- Education: Bloomsburg University of Pennsylvania (B.A.)

Lynda Joy Schlegel Culver (born May 28, 1969) is an American politician from the Commonwealth of Pennsylvania. A member of the Republican Party, she is currently a member of the Pennsylvania State Senate, representing the 27th District since 2023, following her win in a special election. She was formerly a member of the Pennsylvania House of Representatives, representing the 108th District from 2011 until 2023.

== Early life and education ==
Culver was born on May 28, 1969, in Sunbury, Pennsylvania. She graduated from Shikellamy High School in 1987, and earned a Bachelor of Arts degree in political science from Bloomsburg University of Pennsylvania in 1991.

== Political career ==
=== Pennsylvania House of Representatives ===
Culver first ran for the Pennsylvania House of Representatives from the 108th District in 2010 and won. She was later reelected to six more consecutive terms.

=== Pennsylvania State Senate ===
In 2022, Culver announced her candidacy in the 2023 special election to fill the 27th District seat vacated by the resignation of State Senator John Gordner. She won the election held on January 31, defeating Democrat Patricia Lawton with a landslide 70%-30% victory. She was sworn into the Senate on February 28, 2023.

For the 2025-2026 Session Culver serves on the following committees in the State Senate:

- Education (Chair)
- Health & Human Services (Vice Chair)
- Aging & Youth
- Appropriations
- Consumer Protection & Professional Licensure
- Intergovernmental Operations
- Local Government

== Personal life ==
Culver resides in Rockefeller Township, Pennsylvania, with her husband Thomas and their son.
