= Preston Davis (politician) =

American politician (1907–1990)

Member of the Pennsylvania Senate from the 27th district
- In office 1963–1972
- Preceded by: Samuel B. Wolfe
- Succeeded by: Franklin L. Kury

Personal details
- Born: May 19, 1907 Union County, Pennsylvania, US
- Died: November 13, 1990 (aged 83)

Preston B. Davis (May 19, 1907 – November 13, 1990) was an American politician. He was a member of the Pennsylvania State Senate, serving from 1963 to 1972. He was first elected on February 19, 1963.
