= Robert F. Burkardt =

American politician

Member of the Pennsylvania House of Representatives from the 32nd district
- In office 1969–1974
- Preceded by: District created
- Succeeded by: Phyliss T. Kernick

Personal details
- Born: October 17, 1923 Pittsburgh, Pennsylvania
- Died: December 1, 2006 (aged 83) Allegheny County, Pennsylvania
- Party: Republican
- Spouse: Donna Lee Murphy
- Children: David Burkardt, Pamela J. Burkardt, Robert W. Burkardt, Elizabeth A. Burkardt
- Education: University of Pittsburgh, School of Law
- Occupation: Attorney

Robert F. Burkardt (October 17, 1923 – December 1, 2006) was a Republican member of the Pennsylvania House of Representatives.
