= Andy Stepp =

Mississippi politician (1958–2024)

Member of the Mississippi House of Representatives from the 23rd district
- In office January 2, 2024 – December 5, 2024
- Preceded by: Perry Van Bailey
- Succeeded by: Perry Van Bailey

Personal details
- Born: June 23, 1958 Memphis, Tennessee, U.S.
- Died: December 5, 2024 (aged 66) Bruce, Mississippi, U.S.
- Party: Republican
- Profession: Pharmacist

Andrew Earl Stepp (June 23, 1958 – December 5, 2024) was an American politician who represented the 23rd district in the Mississippi House of Representatives from January to December 2024, when he died in office. He was elected in 2023. He was a member of the Republican Party.

== Early life ==
Born in Memphis, Tennessee, and a graduate of the University of Mississippi School of Pharmacy, Stepp was a pharmacist in Bruce, Mississippi, where he owned the Stepp-Saver Pharmacy. He also served as a clinical instructor in pharmacy practice at the University of Mississippi.

== Political career ==
Following the resignation of Charles Beckett from representing the 23rd district in the Mississippi House of Representatives on September 22, 2022, to become the executive director of the Mississippi Public Utilities Staff, Stepp ran in the special election to replace him. He faced Perry Van Bailey and Andy Clark, both farmers from Calhoun County. The election was held on January 10. Andy Stepp received 48.49% of the votes, but as no candidate received 50%, continued to a runoff against Bailey, who had received 38.05%. The runoff was held on January 31. The results were extremely close, and the race was only decided on February 8, with certified results showing Bailey defeating Stepp by 7 votes.

Following his narrow defeat in the special election, Stepp ran as a Republican against Van Bailey in the Republican primary for the 2023 election. Stepp narrowly defeated Van Bailey with 53% of the vote. Stepp won the general election against Democratic candidate Danny Lampley and independent Andy Clark with 71% of the vote. During his time in the legislature, Stepp focused on public health, serving on the Public Health and Human Services Committee alongside the Medicaid, public utility, drug policy and Judiciary A committees.

== Personal life and death ==
Stepp resided in Bruce, Mississippi. He had two daughters and five grandchildren. Stepp was a member of the First Baptist Church of Bruce. He died on December 5, 2024, at the age of 66.

== Electoral history ==
2023 Mississippi's 23rd House of Representatives district special election
Party	Candidate	Votes	%
Nonpartisan	Andrew Stepp	1,142	48.41
Nonpartisan	Perry Van Bailey	900	38.15
Nonpartisan	Andy Clark	317	13.44
Total votes		2,359	100.0

2023 Mississippi's 23rd House of Representatives district special runoff election
Party	Candidate	Votes	%
Nonpartisan	Perry Van Bailey	1,195	50.15
Nonpartisan	Andrew Stepp	1,188	49.85
Total votes		2,383	100.0
Republican hold			

2023 Mississippi's 23rd House of Representatives district Republican primary election
Party	Candidate	Votes	%
Republican	Andrew Stepp	3,135	53.18
Republican	Perry Van Bailey (incumbent)	2,760	46.82
Total votes		5,895	100.0

2023 Mississippi's 23rd House of Representatives district election
Party	Candidate	Votes	%
Republican	Andrew Stepp	5,829	71.91
Democratic	Danny Lampley	1,283	15.83
Independent	Andy Clark	994	12.26
Total votes		8,106	100.0
