= Chris Johnson (Maine politician) =

American politician

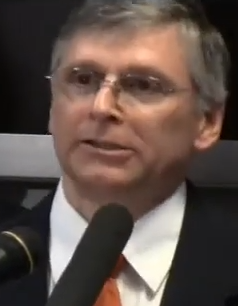
- Johnson in 2012

Member of the Maine Senate from the 13th district 20th district (2012-2014)
- In office February 16, 2012 – December 7, 2016
- Preceded by: David Trahan
- Succeeded by: Dana Dow

Personal details
- Party: Democratic
- Spouse: Valerie Johnson
- Profession: Computer specialist
- Website: Official site

Chris Johnson is an American politician from Maine. He was a member of the Maine Senate. A Democrat, Johnson won a special election to replace David Trahan, who had resigned to work as a lobbyist. In 2010, Johnson lost to Trahan with 32% of the vote. He won election to his first full term in November 2012 by 171 votes over Republican State Representative Les Fossel. He is a resident of Somerville, Maine and a graduate of Bangor High School and the University of Maine.

Johnson is the Director of Information Technology at a technology company in Portland, Maine.

In the 2016 election, Johnson lost his seat to Republican challenger Dana Dow, who had previously served in the Maine Senate from 2004 to 2008.
