= Clinton Collamore =

American politician

Member of the Maine House of Representatives from the 45th district
- In office December 7, 2022 – February 15, 2023
- Preceded by: Jeffrey Evangelos
- Succeeded by: Abden Simmons
- Assuming office December 2026
- Succeeding: Abden Simmons

Personal details
- Party: Democratic; Independent
- Education: University of Maine, Augusta

Clinton Collamore Sr. is an American politician who briefly served as a member of the Maine House of Representatives.

In 2023, he was removed from office after accusations of election fraud. He received 72 hours in prison. He was re-elected to the House in 2026 as an independent.
