= Albert Rasco =

American politician

Member of the Pennsylvania House of Representatives from the 32nd district
- In office 1980–1982
- Preceded by: Phyliss T. Kernick
- Succeeded by: Anthony M. DeLuca

Personal details
- Born: July 2, 1925 Fayette City, Pennsylvania, United States
- Died: February 16, 1989 (aged 63)
- Party: Republican

Albert Rasco (July 2, 1925 – February 16, 1989) was a former Republican member of the Pennsylvania House of Representatives. He was first elected on March 11, 1980.
