= Georgia's 11th Senate district =

American legislative district

Georgia's 11th State Senate district
Senator
Sam Watson; R–Moultrie
- Demographics: 55.75% White; 31.13% Black; 9.36% Hispanic; 0.69% Asian; 0.3% Native American; 0.23% Hawaiian/Pacific Islander; 0.26% Other; 3.33% Multiracial
- Population (2020) • Voting age: 189,976; 144,597

District 11 of the Georgia Senate is a district in South and Southwest Georgia covering much of the Wiregrass region.

The district includes all of Brooks, Colquitt, Cook, Decatur, Grady, Seminole, and Thomas counties. Cities in the district include Bainbridge, Cairo, Moultrie, and Thomasville.

The current senator is Sam Watson, a Republican from Moultrie first elected in 2022.

== District Officeholders ==
- John Bulloch January, 2003 – December 6, 2012 – Republican
- Dean Burke February 11, 2013 – January 2023 – Republican
- Sam Watson January 2023 - Present - Republican
