= Pennsylvania's 27th Senate district =

American legislative district

Pennsylvania's 27th State Senate district
Senator
| Lynda Schlegel Culver; R–Rockefeller Township |
- Population (2021): 260,244

Pennsylvania State Senate District 27 includes part of Luzerne County and all of Columbia County, Montour County, Northumberland County, and Snyder County. It is currently represented by Republican Lynda Schlegel Culver.

== District profile ==
The district includes the following areas:

All of Columbia County

Luzerne County

- Black Creek Township
- Butler Township
- Conyngham
- Conyngham Township
- Dorrance Township
- Fairview Township
- Hollenback Township
- Huntington Township
- Nescopeck
- Nescopeck Township
- New Columbus
- Nuangola
- Rice Township
- Salem Township
- Shickshinny
- Slocum Township
- Sugarloaf Township
- Wright Township

All of Montour County

All of Northumberland County

All of Snyder County

== Senators ==
| Representative | Party | Years | District home | Note | Counties |
|---|---|---|---|---|---|
| Preston B. Davis | Republican | 1963–1972 | | Elected February 19, 1963 | Northumberland, Snyder, Union |
| Preston B. Davis | Republican | 1967–1972 | | Elected February 19, 1963 | Montour, Snyder, Union |
| Franklin L. Kury | Democratic | 1973–1980 | | | Columbia, Northumberland, Snyder, Union, Juniata (part) |
| Edward Helfrick | Republican | 1981–1982 | | Resigned August 22, 2003 | Columbia, Montour, Snyder, Union, Juniata (part) |
| Edward Helfrick | Republican | 1983–1992 | | Resigned August 22, 2003 | Columbia, Montour, Snyder, Luzerne (part), Northumberland (part), Union (part) |
| Edward Helfrick | Republican | 1993–2003 | | Resigned August 22, 2003 | Columbia, Montour, Northumberland, Snyder, Union (part) |
| Vacant | | 2003–2004 | | | Columbia, Montour, Northumberland, Snyder, Union (part) |
| John Gordner | Republican | 2005–2012 | | Elected November 4, 2003 to fill vacancy. Resigned November 30, 2022. | Columbia, Montour, Northumberland, Snyder, Dauphin (part) |
| John Gordner | Republican | 2013–2022 | | Elected November 4, 2003 to fill vacancy. Resigned November 30, 2022. | Columbia, Montour, Northumberland, Snyder, Luzerne (part) |
| Vacant | | 2022–2023 | | | Columbia, Montour, Northumberland, Snyder, Luzerne (part) |
| Lynda Schlegel Culver | Republican | 2023–present | | Elected in special election | Columbia, Montour, Northumberland, Snyder, Luzerne (part) |

== Recent election results ==
2023 Pennsylvania Senate, District 27 special election
| Party | Candidate | Votes | % |
|---|---|---|---|
| Republican | Lynda Schlegel-Culver | 24,462 | 69.68 |
| Democratic | Patricia Lawton | 10,643 | 30.32 |
| Total votes | | 35,105 | 100.00 |
| Republican hold | | | |
