= Benjamin T. Bartlett IV =

American politician

Member of the New Hampshire House of Representatives from the Rockingham 1st district
- In office December 7, 2022 – April 26, 2023
- Succeeded by: Hal Rafter

Personal details
- Party: Republican

Benjamin T. Bartlett IV, also known as Ben Bartlett, is an American politician. He served as a Republican member for the Rockingham 1st district of the New Hampshire House of Representatives.

== Life and career ==
Bartlett served two terms of the Nottingham Selectboard. In November 2022, Bartlett was elected to the New Hampshire House of Representatives along with Jacob Brouillard and Paul Tudor in the general election for the Rockingham 1st district. He assumed office in December 2022 and resigned on April 26, 2023.

In 2024, he lost his bid for a third term on Nottingham's Selectboard by 35 percentage points.
