= 2003 United States state legislative elections =

- November 7, 2003

8 legislative chambers in 4 states
	Majority party	Minority party
Party	Republican	Democratic
Chambers before	53 (Note: The Oregon Senate, North Carolina House of Representatives, and New Jersey Senate were tied prior to the election. Thus, they are not included in this total.)	43
Chambers after	53 (Note: The Oregon Senate and North Carolina House of Representatives were tied prior to the election. Thus, they are not included in this total.)	44
Overall change	Steady	▲1
- Map of upper house elections: Democrats gained control Democrats retained control Republicans retained control No regularly-scheduled elections

- Map of lower house elections: Democrats retained control Republicans retained control No regularly-scheduled elections

The 2003 United States state legislative elections were held on November 7, 2003, alongside other elections. Elections were held for 8 legislative chambers in four states. Both chambers of the Northern Mariana Islands legislature were up.

Partisan change only occurred in one chamber, as Democrats won control of the New Jersey Senate, which was previously tied. However, Democrats did maintain control of the Mississippi Legislature, the Louisiana Legislature, and the New Jersey General Assembly. Republicans maintained control of the Virginia legislature, bringing a post-Civil War low for the Democratic Party.

== Summary table ==
Regularly scheduled elections were held in 8 of the 99 state legislative chambers in the United States. Nationwide, regularly scheduled elections were held for 578 of the 7,383 legislative seats. This table only covers regularly scheduled elections; additional special elections took place concurrently with these regularly scheduled elections.

State	Upper House				Lower House			
State	Seats up	Total	% up	Term	Seats up	Total	% up	Term
Louisiana	39	39	100	4	105	105	100	4
Mississippi	52	52	100	4	122	122	100	4
New Jersey	40	40	100	2/4 (Note: The upper houses of Arkansas, Delaware, Florida, Hawaii, Illinois, Minnesota, New Jersey, and Texas use a 2-4-4 term length system.)	80	80	100	2
Virginia	40	40	100	4	100	100	100	2

== Election predictions ==
Ratings are designated as follows:

- "Tossup": Competitive, no advantage
- "Lean": Competitive, slight advantage
- "Likely": Not competitive, but opposition could make significant gains
- "Solid": Not competitive at all

State	Chamber	Last election	The Cook Political Report Oct. 4, 2002	Result
Louisiana	Senate	D 26–13	Likely D	D 24–15
Louisiana	House of Representatives	D 74–31	Solid D	D 66–37–2
Mississippi	Senate	D 34–18	Solid D	D 29–23
Mississippi	House of Representatives	D 86–33–3	Solid D	D 76–46
New Jersey	Senate	20–20	Tossup	D 22–18
New Jersey	General Assembly	D 44–36	Lean D	D 47–33
Virginia	Senate	R 21–19	Lean R	R 24–16
Virginia	House of Delegates	R 64–34–2	Solid R	R 61–37–2

== State summaries ==
=== Louisiana ===
All seats of the Louisiana State Senate and the Louisiana House of Representatives were up for election to four-year terms in single-member districts. Democrats maintained control of both chambers.

Louisiana State Senate
Party	Before	After	Change
Democratic	26	24	▼2
Republican	13	15	▲2
Total	39	39	

Louisiana House of Representatives
Party	Before	After	Change
Democratic	74	66	▼8
Republican	31	37	▲6
Independent	0	2	▲2
Total	105	105	

=== Mississippi ===
All seats of the Mississippi State Senate and the Mississippi House of Representatives were up for election to four-year terms in single-member districts. Democrats maintained control of both houses.

Mississippi State Senate
Party	Before	After	Change
Democratic	29	29	Steady
Republican	23	23	Steady
Total	52	52	

Mississippi House of Representatives
Party	Before	After	Change
Democratic	81	76	▼5
Republican	38	46	▲8
Independent	3	0	▼3
Total	122	122	

=== New Jersey ===
All seats of the New Jersey Senate and the New Jersey General Assembly were up for election. Senators were elected to two-year terms in single-member districts, while Assembly members were elected to two-year terms in two-member districts. Democrats retained control in of the lower house and won control of the upper house.

Senate
Party	Before	After	Change
Democratic	20	22	▲2
Republican	20	18	▼2
Total	40	40	

General Assembly
Party	Before	After	Change
Democratic	42	47	▲5
Republican	37	33	▼4
Green	1	0	▼1
Total	80	80	

=== Virginia ===
All seats of the Senate of Virginia and the Virginia House of Delegates were up for election in single-member districts. Senators were elected to four-year terms, while delegates served terms of two years. Republicans maintained control of both houses.

Senate of Virginia
Party	Before	After	Change
Democratic	19	16	▼3
Republican	21	24	▲3
Total	40	40	

Virginia House of Delegates
Party	Before	After	Change
Republican	64	61	▼3
Democratic	34	37	▲3
Independent	2	2	Steady
Total	100	100	

== Territorial and federal district summaries ==
=== Northern Mariana Islands ===
All seats of the Northern Mariana Islands House of Representatives and half of the Northern Mariana Islands Senate are up for election. Senators are elected to four-year terms and Representatives are elected to two-year terms.

Senate
Party	Before	After	Change
Republican	5	2	▼3
Democratic	3	2	▼1
Total	9	9	

House of Representatives
Party	Before	After	Change
Republican	16	7	▼9
Democratic	1	1	Steady
Total	18	18	
