= Perry Van Bailey =

Mississippi politician

Member of the Mississippi House of Representatives from the 23rd district
- Incumbent
- Assumed office May 9, 2025
- Preceded by: Andrew Stepp
- In office February 14, 2023 – January 2, 2024
- Preceded by: Charles Beckett
- Succeeded by: Andrew Stepp

Personal details
- Party: Republican

Perry Van Bailey is a farmer who is a member of the Mississippi House of Representatives representing the 23rd district. House District 23 includes portions of Calhoun, Grenada, Lafayette, and Webster counties. He is a native of Calhoun County, Mississippi.

== Political career ==
Van Bailey ran in a 2023 special election to succeed Republican Charles Beckett representing the 23rd district in the Mississippi House of Representatives. Beckett had resigned to become the director for the Mississippi Public Utilities Staff. Special legislative elections in Mississippi are officially nonpartisan, though Van Bailey stated he would serve as a Republican. Both Van Bailey and Andrew Stepp, a pharmacy owner, advanced to a runoff, which Van Bailey won by a margin of 7 votes.

Van Bailey faced Stepp in a rematch in the Republican primary for the 2023 general election to the same seat. Van Bailey lost to Stepp by a margin of 53–47. Following Stepp's death in 2024 Van Bailey was elected to the same seat in a 2025 special election.

== Electoral history ==
2023 Mississippi's 23rd House of Representatives district special election
Party	Candidate	Votes	%
Nonpartisan	Andrew Stepp	1,142	48.41
Nonpartisan	Perry Van Bailey	900	38.15
Nonpartisan	Andy Clark	317	13.44
Total votes		2,359	100.0

2023 Mississippi's 23rd House of Representatives district special runoff election
Party	Candidate	Votes	%
Nonpartisan	Perry Van Bailey	1,195	50.15
Nonpartisan	Andrew Stepp	1,188	49.85
Total votes		2,383	100.0
Republican hold			

2023 Mississippi's 23rd House of Representatives district Republican primary election
Party	Candidate	Votes	%
Republican	Andrew Stepp	3,135	53.18
Republican	Perry Van Bailey (incumbent)	2,760	46.82
Total votes		5,895	100.0
