= Abigail Salisbury =

American politician

Member of the Pennsylvania House of Representatives from the 34th district
- Incumbent
- Assumed office February 21, 2023
- Preceded by: Summer Lee

Personal details
- Born: Ohio, U.S.
- Party: Democratic
- Spouse: Andrew Horowitz
- Education: Case Western Reserve University (B.A.); University of Pittsburgh (J.D., M.P.P.M.)
- Occupation: Lawyer

Abigail Salisbury is an American politician and lawyer. She is a member of the Democratic Party and has represented the 34th district in the Pennsylvania House of Representatives since 2023.

== Early life and education ==
Salisbury was born in Ohio, but moved to Pennsylvania in grade school. She graduated from Fairview High School in 2000. Salisbury attained a bachelor of arts degree from Case Western Reserve University in 2004 and a juris doctor and a Master of Public Policy and Management (M.P.P.M.) from the University of Pittsburgh in 2007 and 2013, respectively.

== Career ==
An attorney, Salisbury ran a low cost law firm representing nonprofits and small businesses. She was also a First Amendment law professor at the University of Pittsburgh and the executive director of the university's legal news and research service. Salisbury previously taught international human rights law in Kosovo and Ethiopia.

From 2018 to 2022, Salisbury served on the borough council of Swissvale, Pennsylvania. She served as council president during her final two years.

In 2022, Salisbury challenged incumbent State Representative Summer Lee in the Democratic primary election. Despite being endorsed by the local Democratic committee, Salisbury was defeated by the incumbent. After Lee was elected to the United States House of Representatives that same year, Salisbury ran in the 2023 special election to fill Lee's vacancy. She defeated Republican Party candidate Robert Pagane. In conjunction with two other simultaneous special elections, Salisbury's victory affirmed Democrats' one-seat majority in the State House following the 2022 election. In 2024, Salisbury faced a primary challenge from Ashley Comans, a progressive ally of Lee. Despite Comans outraising Salisbury and earning the endorsements of Lee, Pittsburgh Mayor Ed Gainey, and Allegheny County Executive Sara Innamorato, Salisbury defeated Comans 65%-35%. She faced no opposition in the general election.

== Political positions ==
Salisbury supports legalizing marijuana and psilocybin. She identifies as pro-choice. Salisbury opposes fracking and wants stricter standards for charter schools.

== Personal life ==
Salisbury is Jewish. Both she and her husband are involved in their congregation. She is bisexual and is on the autism spectrum.

== Electoral history ==
2017 Swissvale council Democratic primary election
Party	Candidate	Votes	%
Democratic	Abigail Salisbury	799	21.90
Democratic	Julie A. Grose (incumbent)	748	20.50
Democratic	David Petrarca (incumbent)	629	17.24
Democratic	Michele Kotula Stanton (incumbent)	528	14.47
Democratic	Martin F. Busch (incumbent)	512	14.04
Democratic	Sean L. Ruppert	413	11.23
Write-in		19	0.52
Total votes		3,648	100.00

2017 Swissvale council election
Party	Candidate	Votes	%
Democratic	Abigail Salisbury	1,296	25.09
Democratic	David Petrarca (incumbent)	1,287	24.92
Democratic	Julie A. Grose (incumbent)	1,275	24.69
Democratic	Michele Kotula Stanton (incumbent)	1,248	24.16
Write-in		59	1.14
Total votes		5,165	100.00

2021 Swissvale council Democratic primary election
Party	Candidate	Votes	%
Democratic	Abigail Salisbury (incumbent)	1,091	21.58
Democratic	Shawn Alfonso Wells	1,034	20.45
Democratic	Joshua Miser	640	12.66
Democratic	Angela D. Stribling	598	11.83
Democratic	Martin F. Busch	506	10.01
Democratic	Frank Berry	489	9.67
Democratic	Fred Lee Quinn III	434	8.58
Democratic	John Wilson	237	4.69
Write-in		27	0.57
Total votes		5,056	100.00

2021 Swissvale council election
Party	Candidate	Votes	%
Democratic	Abigail Salisbury (incumbent)	1,488	23.04
Democratic	Shawn Alfonso Wells	1,415	21.91
Democratic	Joshua Miser	1,315	20.37
Democratic	Angela D. Stribling	1,299	20.12
Republican	Martin F. Busch	487	7.54
No Affiliation	Brandon Mahler	432	6.69
Write-in		21	0.33
Total votes		6,457	100.00

2022 Pennsylvania House of Representatives Democratic primary election, District 34
Party	Candidate	Votes	%
Democratic	Summer Lee (incumbent)	9,168	65.59
Democratic	Abigail Salisbury	4,767	34.11
Write-in		42	0.30
Total votes		13,977	100.00

2023 Pennsylvania House of Representatives special election, District 34
Party	Candidate	Votes	%
Democratic	Abigail Salisbury	10,282	87.60
Republican	Robert Pagane	1,416	12.06
Write-in		39	0.33
Total votes		11,737	100.00
Democratic hold			

2024 Pennsylvania House of Representatives Democratic primary election, District 34
Party	Candidate	Votes	%
Democratic	Abigail Salisbury (incumbent)	8,111	62.86
Democratic	Ashley Comans	4,756	36.86
Write-in		36	0.28
Total votes		12,903	100.00

2024 Pennsylvania House of Representatives election, District 34
Party	Candidate	Votes	%
Democratic	Abigail Salisbury	30,209	97.45
Write-in		789	2.55
Total votes		30,998	100.00
