= Somerville, Maine =

Town in Maine, United States

- Town
- Seal

- Location in Lincoln County and the state of Maine.
- Coordinates: 44°17′22″N 69°28′40″W
- Country: United States
- State: Maine
- County: Lincoln
- Incorporation: March 25, 1858

Area
  - Total: 22.81 sq mi (59.08 km^{2})
  - Land: 21.93 sq mi (56.80 km^{2})
  - Water: 0.88 sq mi (2.28 km^{2})
- Elevation: 430 ft (130 m)

Population (2020)
  - Total: 600
  - Density: 27/sq mi (10.6/km^{2})
- Time zone: UTC-5 (Eastern (EST))
  - Summer (DST): UTC-4 (EDT)
- ZIP code: 04348
- Area code: 207
- FIPS code: 23-69645
- GNIS feature ID: 582729
- Website: www.somervillemaine.org

Somerville is a town in Lincoln County, Maine, United States. The population was 600 at the 2020 census. Somerville is located 15 miles east of the state capital, Augusta.

== Geography ==
According to the United States Census Bureau, the town has a total area of 22.81 square miles (59.08 km^{2}), of which 21.93 square miles (56.80 km^{2}) is land and 0.88 square miles (2.28 km^{2}) is water.

== Demographics ==
Historical population
Census	Pop.	Note	%±
1860	606		—
1870	505		−16.7%
1880	539		6.7%
1890	453		−16.0%
1900	374		−17.4%
1910	291		−22.2%
1920	256		−12.0%
1930	229		−10.5%
1940	266		16.2%
1950	227		−14.7%
1960	254		11.9%
1970	215		−15.4%
1980	377		75.3%
1990	458		21.5%
2000	509		11.1%
2010	548		7.7%
2020	600		9.5%
U.S. Decennial Census

=== 2010 census ===
As of the census of 2010, there were 548 people, 225 households, and 153 families residing in the town. The population density was 25.0 inhabitants per square mile (9.7/km^{2}). There were 309 housing units at an average density of 14.1 per square mile (5.4/km^{2}). The racial makeup of the town was 94.7% White, 0.4% African American, 0.2% Native American, 1.8% Asian, 0.4% from other races, and 2.6% from two or more races. Hispanic or Latino of any race were 2.7% of the population.

There were 225 households, of which 26.7% had children under the age of 18 living with them, 50.7% were married couples living together, 8.9% had a female householder with no husband present, 8.4% had a male householder with no wife present, and 32.0% were non-families. 26.2% of all households were made up of individuals, and 8.9% had someone living alone who was 65 years of age or older. The average household size was 2.44 and the average family size was 2.84.

The median age in the town was 44 years. 23.5% of residents were under the age of 18; 4.8% were between the ages of 18 and 24; 22.3% were from 25 to 44; 35.6% were from 45 to 64; and 13.9% were 65 years of age or older. The gender makeup of the town was 52.0% male and 48.0% female.

=== 2000 census ===
As of the census of 2000, there were 509 people, 202 households, and 136 families residing in the town. The population density was 23.3 people per square mile (9.0/km^{2}). There were 286 housing units at an average density of 13.1 per square mile (5.0/km^{2}). The racial makeup of the town was 97.64% White, 0.20% African American, 0.98% Native American, 0.20% Asian, and 0.98% from two or more races. Hispanic or Latino of any race were 0.98% of the population.

There were 202 households, out of which 28.7% had children under the age of 18 living with them, 55.9% were married couples living together, 6.9% had a female householder with no husband present, and 32.2% were non-families. 25.7% of all households were made up of individuals, and 6.9% had someone living alone who was 65 years of age or older. The average household size was 2.52 and the average family size was 3.01.

In the town, the population was spread out, with 26.9% under the age of 18, 4.7% from 18 to 24, 29.1% from 25 to 44, 29.3% from 45 to 64, and 10.0% who were 65 years of age or older. The median age was 41 years. For every 100 females, there were 105.2 males. For every 100 females age 18 and over, there were 104.4 males.

The median income for a household in the town was $37,125, and the median income for a family was $40,455. Males had a median income of $26,818 versus $24,500 for females. The per capita income for the town was $15,906. About 16.4% of families and 21.7% of the population were below the poverty line, including 30.4% of those under age 18 and 17.2% of those age 65 or over.

== Notable person ==
- Chris Johnson, former state legislator
