= Pennsylvania House of Representatives, District 108 =

American legislative district

Pennsylvania's 108th State House of Representatives district
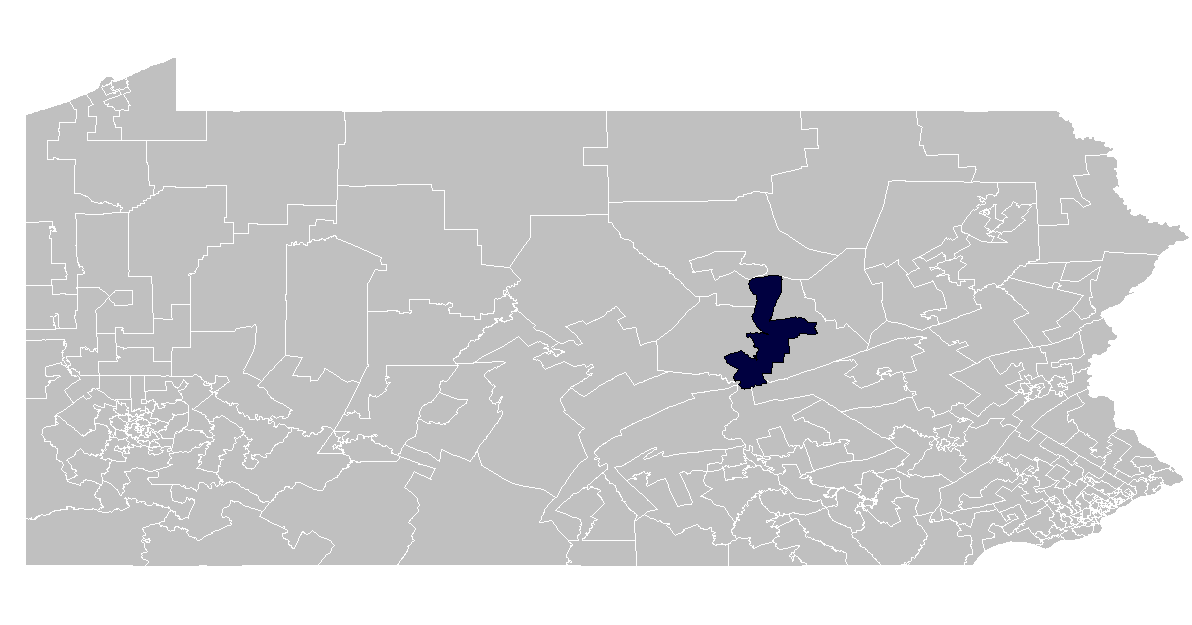
Representative
Michael Stender; R–Sunbury

The 108th Pennsylvania House of Representatives District is located in Montour County and Northumberland County and includes the following areas:

- All of Montour County
- Northumberland County
  - Delaware Township
  - East Chillisquaque Township
  - Lewis Township
  - McEwensville
  - Milton
  - Northumberland
  - Point Township
  - Riverside
  - Rockefeller Township
  - Rush Township
- Northumberland County (continued)
  - Snydertown
  - Sunbury
  - Turbot Township
  - Turbotville
  - Upper Augusta Township
  - Watsontown
  - West Chillisquaque Township

== Representatives ==
Representative	Party	Years	District home	Notes
Before 1969, seats were apportioned by county.
Franklin L. Kury	Democrat	1969 – 1972		
George O. Wagner	Republican	1973 – 1980		Resigned on January 7, 1980
Merle Phillips	Republican	1980 – 2010	Upper Augusta Township	Elected April 1980 to fill vacancy. Retired.
Lynda Schlegel-Culver	Republican	2011 – 2023	Rockefeller Township	Resigned after being elected to State Senate
Michael Stender	Republican	2023 – present	Sunbury	Elected May 2023 to fill vacancy

== Recent election results ==
2023 Pennsylvania House of Representatives, District 108 special election
Party	Candidate	Votes	%
Republican	Mike Stender	6,600	58.35
Democratic	Trevor Finn	4,318	38.18
Libertarian	Elijah Scretching	393	3.47
Total votes		11,311	100.00
Republican hold			

PA House election, 2022: Pennsylvania House of Representatives, District 108
Party	Candidate	Votes	%
Republican	Lynda Schlegel-Culver	Unopposed	
Total votes		21,915	100.00
Republican hold			

== Sources ==
- Trostle, Sharon, ed. (2009). The Pennsylvania Manual. Vol. 119. Harrisburg: Pennsylvania Department of General Services. ISBN 0-8182-0334-X.
