= Michael Stender =

American politician

Mike Stender

Member of the Pennsylvania House of Representatives from the 108th district
- Incumbent
- Assumed office June 5, 2023
- Preceded by: Lynda Schlegel Culver

Personal details
- Party: Republican
- Children: 3

Michael A.K. Stender Jr. is an American politician who represents the 108th District in the Pennsylvania House of Representatives since 2023.

== Career ==
An EMT and firefighter, Stender was elected to the Shikellamy School Board in 2021, after being unsuccessful in the primary election in 2019.

In 2023, Stender was chosen for the Republican nomination in the special election to fill the 108th District seat in the Pennsylvania House of Representatives. The seat was open following the election of Lynda Schlegel Culver to the Pennsylvania State Senate. The 108th was a solidly Republican district, and Stender won with the support of Culver. He was sworn in on June 5, 2023.

== Personal life ==
Stender resides in Sunbury, Pennsylvania and has three daughters.

== Electoral history ==
2019 Shikellamy School Directors Republican primary election
Party	Candidate	Votes	%
Republican	Jeffrey Balestrini	1,641	16.85
Republican	Wendy K. West	1,619	16.63
Republican	Lori Garman	1,435	14.74
Republican	Slade Shreck	1,396	14.34
Republican	Jennifer L. Wetzel	1,314	13.49
Republican	Michael Stender	1,254	12.88
Republican	Jerome J. Alex	1,036	10.64
Write-in		42	0.43
Total votes		9,737	100.00

2021 Shikellamy School Directors Democratic primary election
Party	Candidate	Votes	%
Democratic	Joseph R. Fischer	718	26.07
Democratic	Jenna Eister-Whitaker	686	24.91
Democratic	Michael Stender	682	24.76
Democratic	Justin Lenner	642	23.31
Write-in		26	0.94
Total votes		2,754	100.00

2021 Shikellamy School Directors Republican primary election
Party	Candidate	Votes	%
Republican	Michael Stender	1,799	25.50
Republican	Jenna Eister-Whitaker	1,777	25.19
Republican	Michael P. Thomas	1,714	24.29
Republican	Justin Lenner	1,669	23.66
Write-in		96	1.36
Total votes		7,055	100.00

2021 Shikellamy School Directors election
Party	Candidate	Votes	%
Republican	Michael Stender	2,640	22.63
Republican	Jenna Eister Whitaker	2,553	21.89
Republican	Justin Lenner	2,310	19.80
Republican	Michael P. Thomas	2,494	21.38
Democratic	Joseph Fischer	1,471	12.61
Write-in		194	1.66
Total votes		11,664	100.00

2023 Pennsylvania House of Representatives special election, District 108
Party	Candidate	Votes	%
Republican	Michael Stender	6,600	58.30
Democratic	Trevor S. Finn	4,318	38.14
Libertarian	Elijah Scretching	393	3.47
Write-in		10	0.09
Total votes		11,321	100.00

2024 Pennsylvania House of Representatives election, District 108
Party	Candidate	Votes	%
Republican	Michael Stender (incumbent)	27,630	96.36
Write-in		1,045	3.64
Total votes		28,675	100.00

== Sources ==
- "Summary Results Report GENERAL PRIMARY ELECTION May 18, 2021 OFFICIAL RESULTS Northumberland" (PDF). Northumberland County, Pennsylvania. June 2, 2021a.
