= Wendy Pieh =

American politician

Member of the Maine House of Representatives
- In office 2006–2010
- Preceded by: David Trahan
- Succeeded by: Dana Dow
- Constituency: 50th district
- In office 1996–2000
- Preceded by: Chester Rice
- Succeeded by: Christopher Hall
- Constituency: 56th district

Personal details
- Party: Democratic

Wendy Pieh is an American politician from the state of Maine. A member of the Democratic Party, she represented the 56th district in the Maine House of Representatives from 1996 to 2000 and the 50th district from 2006 to 2010.

== Political career ==
Pieh currently serves as the chair of the Bremen select board. On March 26, 2023, officials of the Maine Democratic Party nominated Pieh for the upcoming special election in Maine's 45th House of Representatives district. She lost that special election

== Personal life ==
Pieh and her husband operate a farm raising cashmere goats.
