= Sam Watson (politician) =

American politician from Georgia

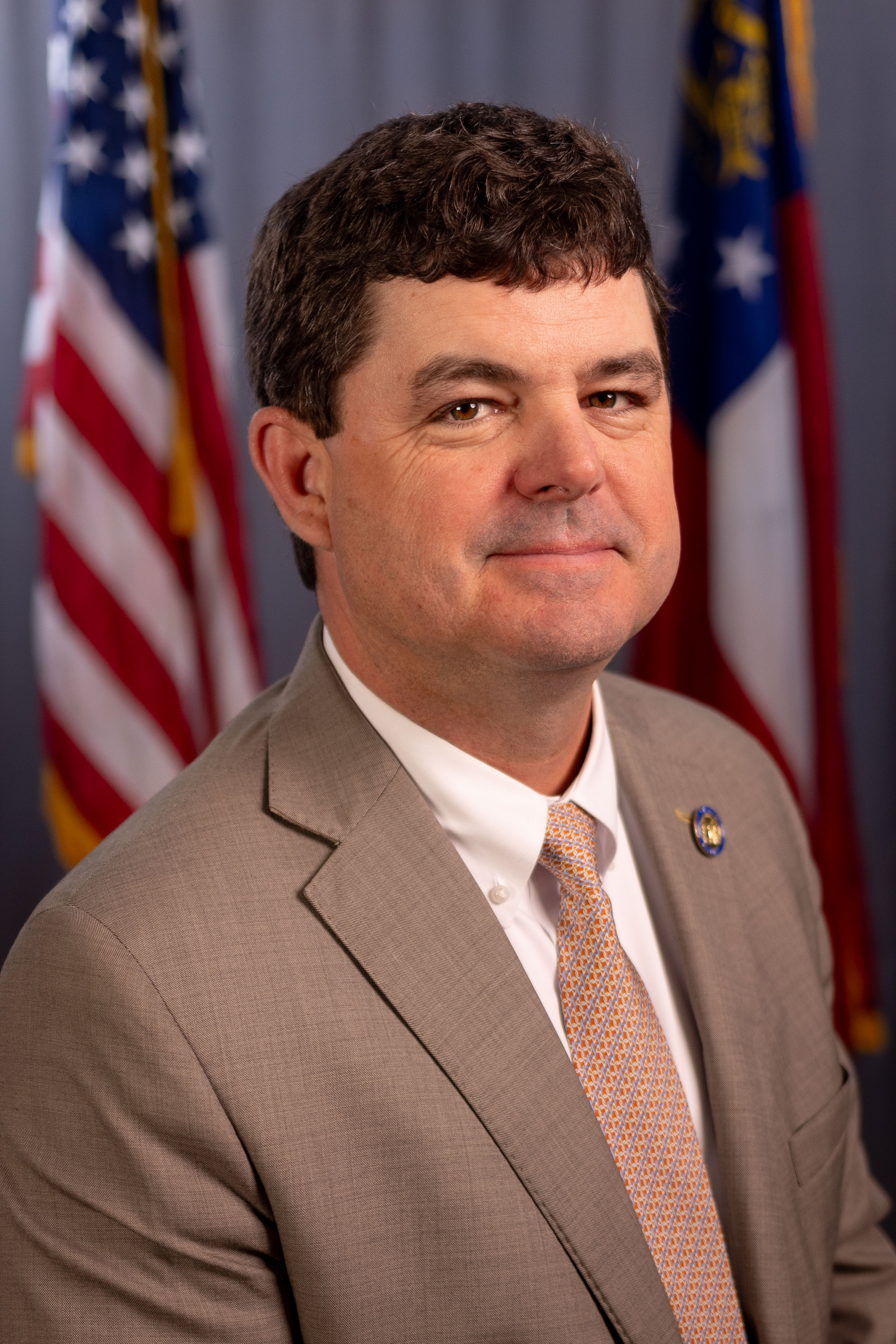

Member of the Georgia State Senate from the 11th district
- Incumbent
- Assumed office February 6, 2023
- Preceded by: Dean Burke

Member of the Georgia State House of Representatives from the 172nd district
- In office January 14, 2013 – December 31, 2022
- Preceded by: Eugene Maddox
- Succeeded by: Charles Cannon

Personal details
- Born: Samuel Lawrence Watson; September 19, 1978 (age 47)
- Party: Republican
- Spouse: Emily
- Occupation: Politician

Samuel Lawrence Watson (born September 19, 1978) is an American politician from Georgia serving as a Republican member of the Georgia Senate, representing the 11th district. Watson was previously a member of the Georgia House of Representatives from 2013 to 2022. He resigned his house seat to run in a 2023 special election to replace retired senator Dean Burke.
