= John Gordner =

American politician

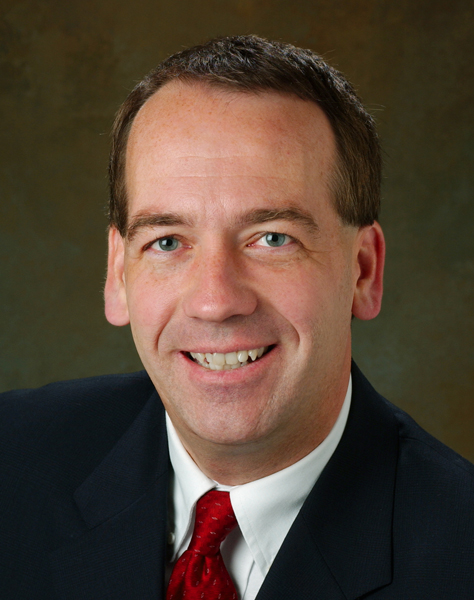

Member of the Pennsylvania Senate from the 27th district
- In office November 24, 2003 – November 30, 2022
- Preceded by: Edward Helfrick
- Succeeded by: Lynda Schlegel Culver

Member of the Pennsylvania House of Representatives from the 109th district
- In office January 5, 1993 – November 24, 2003
- Preceded by: Ted Stuban
- Succeeded by: David R. Millard

Personal details
- Born: January 5, 1962 (age 64) Berwick, Pennsylvania, U.S.
- Party: Republican (2001–present); Democratic (before 2001)
- Spouse: Lori
- Education: Dickinson College (B.A.); Dickinson School of Law (JD)
- Alma mater: Berwick Area High School

John R. Gordner (born January 5, 1962) is an American attorney and politician. A Republican, he represented the 27th District in the Pennsylvania State Senate (2003–2022) and the 109th District in the Pennsylvania House of Representatives (1993–2003). He is a former Democrat, having switched parties in 2001.

== Early life and education ==
Gordner was born on January 5, 1962, in Berwick, Pennsylvania, the son of Carl L. and Shirley Gordner. He graduated from Berwick Area High School in 1979. Gordner earned a Bachelor of Arts degree from Dickinson College in 1983 and a Juris Doctor degree from Dickinson School of Law in 1987.

== Political career ==
Gordner was elected to the Pennsylvania House of Representatives in 1992 and served 11 years in that body.

In 2001, Gordner changed political parties from Democrat to Republican.

In 2003, he won a special election to represent Pennsylvania's 27th Senate District, replacing Ed Helfrick, who abruptly retired from the Senate earlier that year.

In 2022, Gordner resigned from the State Senate to become counsel to incoming President pro tempore of the Pennsylvania Senate Kim Ward.

== Personal life ==
Gordner is married to his wife, Lori. They have two children.
