= Phyllis Kernick =

American politician

Phyllis T. Kernick

Member of the Pennsylvania House of Representatives from the 32nd district
- In office 1975 – January 7, 1980
- Preceded by: Robert F. Burkhardt
- Succeeded by: Albert Rasco

Personal details
- Born: December 14, 1924 Penn Hills, Pennsylvania, United States
- Died: January 21, 2009 (aged 84) Penn Hills, Pennsylvania, United States
- Party: Democratic
- Spouse: William Kernick

Phyllis T. Kernick (December 14, 1924 – January 21, 2009) was a Democratic member of the Pennsylvania House of Representatives.

== Formative years and family ==
Born in Penn Hills, Pennsylvania, on December 14, 1924, Kernick graduated from Penn Hills High School and the two-year business program of the Robert Morris School of Business (now Robert Morris University).

She then pursued further studies at Duquesne University, Point Park College (now Point Park University), and the University of Pittsburgh's Institute of Local Government.

She and her husband, William Kernick, had six children between 1947 and 1960.

== Career ==
Employed as a secretary with the international law firm of Reed Smith, she was elected as auditor for the Allegheny County Hospital Development Authority in 1964, and was then elected as treasurer of Penn Hills Township, serving in that capacity from 1969 to 1976. During her early career, she had also served as a member of the Allegheny Regional Planning Council and the Governor's Justice Commission.

Elected as a Democrat to the Pennsylvania House of Representatives for the 1974 term, she was subsequently reelected in 1976 and 1978.

Following her resignation from the Pennsylvania House on January 7, 1980, she was elected as mayor of Penn Hills Township. She served in that capacity from 1980 to 1984. Roughly a decade later, she was elected to the Penn Hills Township Council, and served on that leadership body from 1994 to 1998.

== Death and interment ==
Kernick died from congestive heart failure at the age of eighty-four on January 21, 2009, in Penn Hills Township, and was interred at the Plum Creek Cemetery in Plum, Pennsylvania.
