= Joe McAndrew (politician) =

American politician

Member of the Pennsylvania House of Representatives from the 32nd district
- Incumbent
- Assumed office February 21, 2023
- Preceded by: Tony DeLuca

Personal details
- Born: August 1, 1990 (age 35) Allegheny County, Pennsylvania, U.S.
- Party: Democratic
- Spouse: MichelleMcAndrew

Joseph Melvin McAndrew (born August 1, 1990) is an American politician. A Democrat, he is currently a member of the Pennsylvania House of Representatives, representing the 32nd district since 2023.

== Early life and education ==
McAndrew was born in Allegheny County, Pennsylvania. He graduated from Fox Chapel Area High School in 2008. McAndrew earned his bachelor of arts degree in political science from the University of Dayton in 2012.

== Political career ==
From 2012 to 2014, he was a research analyst for the Democratic caucus in the Pennsylvania House of Representatives. In 2017, McAndrew unsuccessfully ran for mayor of Oakmont, Pennsylvania. In 2021, McAndrew was the executive director of the Allegheny County Democratic Party.

Following the death of State Representative Tony DeLuca, McAndrew, then the chair of the Penn Hills Democratic Committee, was nominated by the Allegheny County Democratic Party to replace the late representative. He defeated Republican candidate Clayton Walker in the February 2023 special election to represent the 32nd district. In addition to two other simultaneous special elections, McAndrew's victory affirmed Democrats' one-seat majority in the State House following the 2022 election. In 2024, McAndrew beat Penn Hills Mayor Pauline Calabrese in the Democratic primary election. Calabrese had previously vied against McAndrew in 2023 for the Democratic nomination in the special election. McAndrew is facing no Republican opposition in the primary election.

In February 2024, McAndrew was made chair of the House Subcommittee on Public Transportation.

== Political positions ==
McAndrew supports legalizing marijuana and expanding abortion access. He also supports concealed-carry permits for gun owners and expanding background checks.

== Electoral history ==
2017 Oakmont mayoral Democratic primary election
Party	Candidate	Votes	%
Democratic	Joe McAndrew	441	54.58
Democratic	John Griffin Conley	361	44.68
Write-in		6	0.74
Total votes		808	100.00

2017 Oakmont mayoral election
Party	Candidate	Votes	%
Republican	Christopher Adam Whaley	1,123	54.28
Democratic	Joe McAndrew	915	44.22
Write-in		31	1.50
Total votes		2,069	100.00

2023 Pennsylvania House of Representatives special election, District 32
Party	Candidate	Votes	%
Democratic	Joe McAndrew	9,601	74.63
Republican	Clay Walker	3,195	24.84
Write-in		68	0.53
Total votes		12,864	100.00
Democratic hold			

2024 Pennsylvania House of Representatives Democratic primary election, District 32
Party	Candidate	Votes	%
Democratic	Joe McAndrew (incumbent)	6,803	70.40
Democratic	Pauline Calabrese	2,836	29.35
Write-in		25	0.26
Total votes		9,664	100.00

2024 Pennsylvania House of Representatives Republican primary election, District 32
Party	Candidate	Votes	%
Write-in	Joe McAndrew	301	55.43
	Other write-ins	242	44.57
Total votes		543	100.00
