= George O. Wagner =

American politician

Member of the Pennsylvania House of Representatives from the 108th district
- In office 1973 – January 7, 1980

Personal details
- Born: April 12, 1946 (age 80) Danville, Pennsylvania
- Party: Republican

George O. Wagner IV (born April 12, 1946) is a former Republican member of the Pennsylvania House of Representatives.
