= Dean Burke =

American politician

Member of the Georgia Senate from the 11th district
- In office February 11, 2013 – December 31, 2022
- Preceded by: John Bulloch
- Succeeded by: Sam Watson

Personal details
- Born: Kenneth Dean Burke; September 7, 1957 (age 69) Donalsonville, Georgia, U.S.
- Party: Republican
- Education: Georgia Southwestern State University; Medical College of Georgia
- Profession: Doctor

Kenneth Dean Burke (born September 7, 1957) is a former Republican member of the Georgia State Senate from Bainbridge, Georgia. Burke was first elected senator in the 2012 general election, and served Georgia's 11th district—a constituency which includes Colquitt, Decatur, Early, Grady, Miller, and Seminole counties—with portions of Mitchell and Thomas counties as well. Burke resigned in December 2022 to become chief medical officer of the Georgia Department of Community Health.

== Early life and education ==
Dean Burke graduated summa cum laude from Georgia Southwestern State University—going on to graduate from the Medical College of Georgia. He then trained in specialized medicine at Mercer University's School of Medicine. Burke is board certified and has been a practicing physician in Georgia for the past 28 years.

== Political career ==
Senator Burke was elected in 2012 and sworn into the Senate in 2013. He sat on the Senate Agriculture and Consumer Affairs, Education and Youth, Health and Human Services, and Retirement committees.

=== Committee assignments ===
Senate Committee, seats held
Agriculture and Consumer Affairs, member • Education and Youth, member • Health and Human Services, member • Retirement, vice chairman

== See also ==
- List of state government committees (Georgia)
