= Charles Cannon (Georgia politician) =

American politician

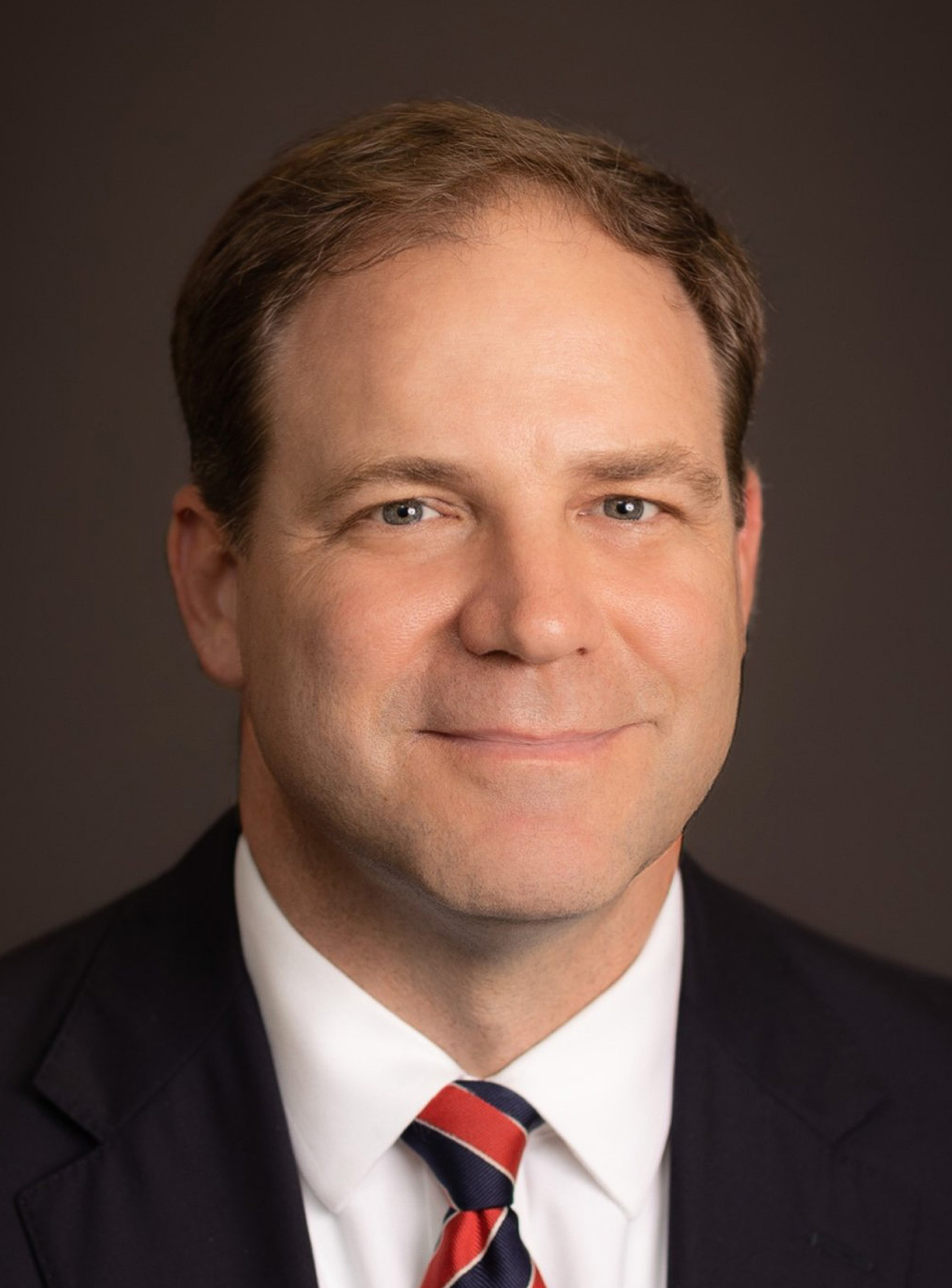
- Official headshot

Member of the Georgia House of Representatives from the 172nd district
- Incumbent
- Assumed office January 31, 2023
- Preceded by: Sam Watson

Personal details
- Party: Republican

Charles "Chas" Cannon is an American politician from the Georgia Republican Party who serves as a member of the Georgia House of Representatives representing District 172. In 2023 he was elected to the Georgia House of Representatives in a special election to replace Sam Watson who resigned to run for State Senate.
