= Charles Beckett (politician) =

American politician

Member of the Mississippi House of Representatives from the 23rd district
- In office 2003 – September 22, 2022
- Preceded by: Joe T. Grist Jr.
- Succeeded by: Perry Van Bailey

Personal details
- Born: July 25, 1958 (age 67) Bruce, Mississippi, U.S.
- Party: Republican
- Children: 2
- Education: Northwest Community College; University of Mississippi (BA); University of Mississippi School of Law (JD)

Charles Jim Beckett (born July 25, 1958) is an American lawyer and politician. He was a member of the Mississippi House of Representatives from the 23rd District, being first elected in 2002. He is a member of the Republican party. He resigned from the House on September 22, 2022, after Governor Tate Reeves appointed him executive director of the Mississippi Public Utilities Staff.
