= Pennsylvania House of Representatives, District 32 =

American legislative district

Pennsylvania's 32nd State House of Representatives district
Representative
| Joe McAndrew; D–Penn Hills |
- Population (2022): 64,205

The 32nd Pennsylvania House of Representatives District is in southwestern Pennsylvania, located entirely in Allegheny County. The district has been represented by Democrat Joe McAndrew since 2023.

== District profile ==
The 32nd Pennsylvania House of Representatives District is located in Allegheny County and includes the following areas:

- Oakmont
- Penn Hills Township
- Plum (part)
  - District 01
  - District 02
  - District 03
  - District 07
  - District 17
  - District 18
  - District 19
  - District 20
  - District 21
- Verona

== Representatives ==
| Representative | Party | Years | District home | Note |
Prior to 1969, seats were apportioned by county.
| Robert F. Burkhardt | Republican | 1969 – 1974 | | |
| Phyliss T. Kernick | Democrat | 1975 – 1980 | | Resigned on January 7, 1980 |
| Albert Rasco | Republican | 1980 – 1982 | | Elected on March 11, 1980, to fill vacancy |
| Anthony M. DeLuca | Democrat | 1983 – 2022 | Verona | Died on October 9, 2022 |
| Joe McAndrew | Democrat | 2023 – present | Penn Hills | Incumbent |

== Recent election results ==
PA House election, 2024: Pennsylvania House, District 32
| Party | Candidate | Votes | % |
|---|---|---|---|
| Democratic | Joe McAndrew (incumbent) | Unopposed | |
| Total votes | | 31,207 | 100.00 |
| Democratic hold | | | |

PA House special election, 2023: Pennsylvania House, District 32
| Party | Candidate | Votes | % |
|---|---|---|---|
| Democratic | Joe McAndrew | 9,604 | 75.04 |
| Republican | Clayton Walker | 3,195 | 24.96 |
| Total votes | | 12,799 | 100.00 |
| Democratic hold | | | |

PA House election, 2022: Pennsylvania House, District 32
| Party | Candidate | Votes | % |
|---|---|---|---|
| Democratic | Anthony M. DeLuca (incumbent) | 21,796 | 85.98 |
| Green | Queonia Zarah Livingston | 3,555 | 14.02 |
| Total votes | | 25,351 | 100.00 |
| Democratic hold | | | |

PA House election, 2020: Pennsylvania House, District 32
| Party | Candidate | Votes | % |
|---|---|---|---|
| Democratic | Anthony M. DeLuca (incumbent) | Unopposed | |
| Total votes | | 30,332 | 100.00 |
| Democratic hold | | | |

PA House election, 2018: Pennsylvania House, District 32
| Party | Candidate | Votes | % |
|---|---|---|---|
| Democratic | Anthony M. DeLuca (incumbent) | Unopposed | |
| Total votes | | 22,864 | 100.00 |
| Democratic hold | | | |

PA House election, 2016: Pennsylvania House, District 32
| Party | Candidate | Votes | % |
|---|---|---|---|
| Democratic | Anthony M. DeLuca (incumbent) | Unopposed | |
| Total votes | | 28,716 | 100.00 |
| Democratic hold | | | |

PA House election, 2014: Pennsylvania House, District 32
| Party | Candidate | Votes | % |
|---|---|---|---|
| Democratic | Anthony M. DeLuca (incumbent) | Unopposed | |
| Total votes | | 15,093 | 100.00 |
| Democratic hold | | | |

PA House election, 2012: Pennsylvania House, District 32
| Party | Candidate | Votes | % |
|---|---|---|---|
| Democratic | Anthony M. DeLuca (incumbent) | 21,597 | 74.92 |
| Republican | Lawrence Paladin, Jr. | 7,229 | 25.08 |
| Total votes | | 28,826 | 100.00 |
| Democratic hold | | | |

PA House election, 2010: Pennsylvania House, District 32
| Party | Candidate | Votes | % |
|---|---|---|---|
| Democratic | Anthony M. DeLuca (incumbent) | Unopposed | |
| Total votes | | 15,734 | 100.00 |
| Democratic hold | | | |
