= Rockefeller Township, Pennsylvania =

Township in Pennsylvania, US

Coordinates: 40°50′00″N 76°45′29″W

- Township
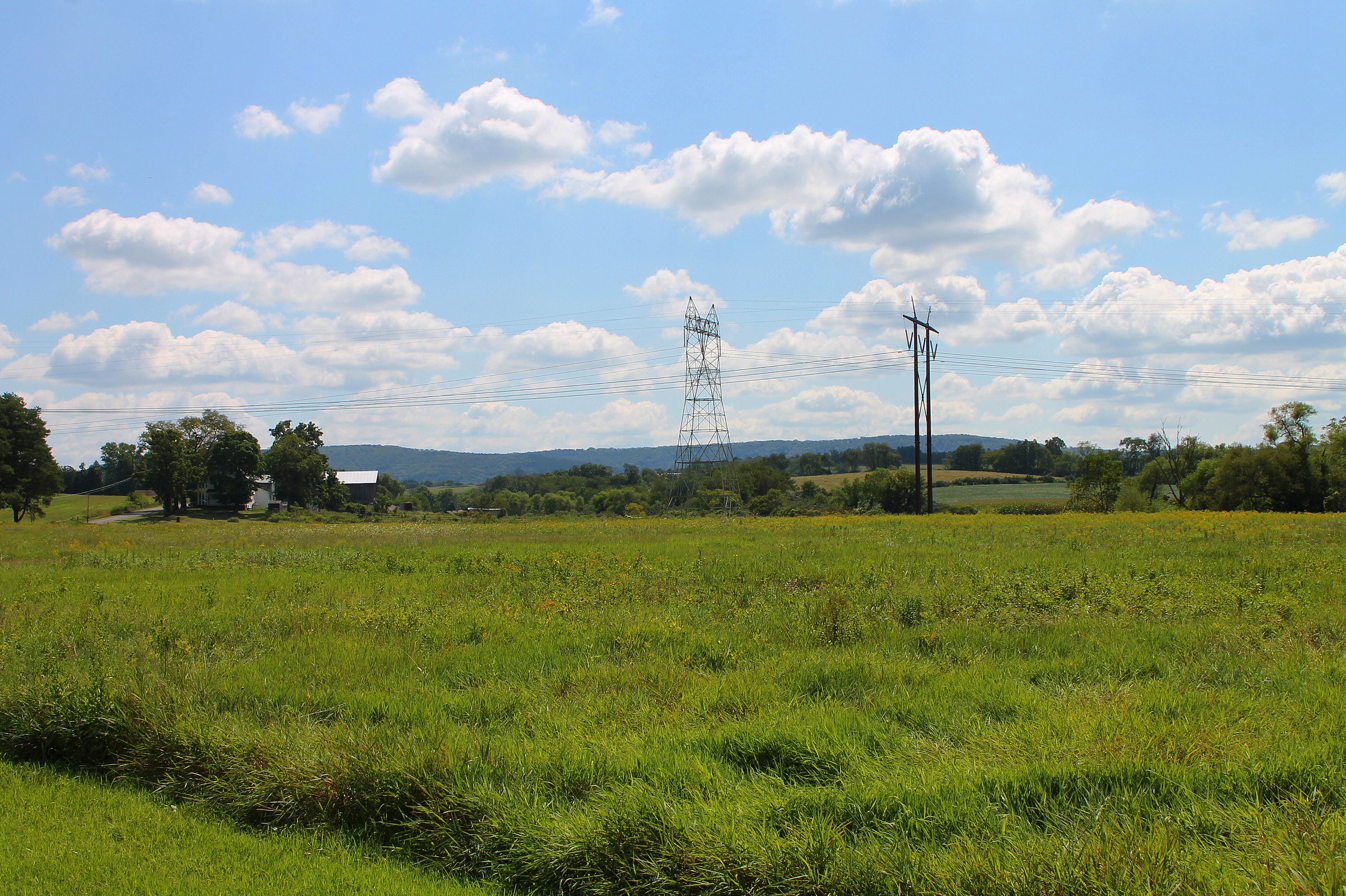
- Scenery in Rockefeller Township

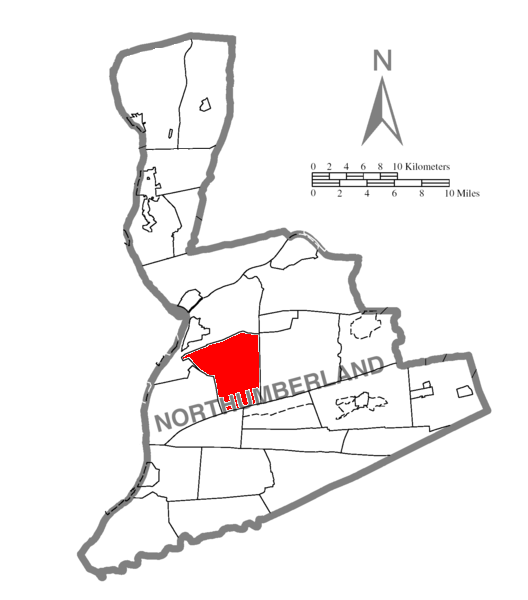
- Map of Northumberland County, Pennsylvania highlighting Rockefeller Township

- Map of Northumberland County, Pennsylvania
- Country: United States
- State: Pennsylvania
- County: Northumberland
- Settled: 1774
- Incorporated: 1880

Government
  - Type: Board of Supervisors

Area
  - Total: 20.36 sq mi (52.73 km^{2})
  - Land: 20.34 sq mi (52.68 km^{2})
  - Water: 0.019 sq mi (0.05 km^{2})

Population (2010)
  - Total: 2,273
  - Estimate (2016): 2,248
  - Density: 110.5/sq mi (42.67/km^{2})
- Time zone: UTC-5 (Eastern (EST))
  - Summer (DST): UTC-4 (EDT)
- Area code: 570
- FIPS code: 42-097-65472
- Website: https://rockefellertownship.org/

Rockefeller Township is a township in Northumberland County, Pennsylvania, United States. The population at the 2010 Census was 2,273, an increase over the figure of 2,221 tabulated in 2000.

== History ==
The Zion Stone Church was listed on the National Register of Historic Places on October 6, 1984.

== Geography ==
According to the United States Census Bureau, the township has a total area of 20.6 square miles (53.4 km^{2}), all land.

== Demographics ==
Historical population
Census	Pop.	Note	%±
2010	2,273		—
2016 (est.)	2,248		−1.1%
U.S. Decennial Census

As of the census of 2000, there were 2,221 people, 836 households, and 681 families residing in the township. The population density was 107.6 inhabitants per square mile (41.5/km^{2}). There were 868 housing units at an average density of 42.1 per square mile (16.3/km^{2}). The racial makeup of the township was 99.19% White, 0.05% African American, 0.14% Native American, 0.09% Asian, 0.23% from other races, and 0.32% from two or more races. Hispanic or Latino of any race were 0.23% of the population.

There were 836 households, out of which 31.8% had children under the age of 18 living with them, 73.3% were married couples living together, 5.6% had a female householder with no husband present, and 18.5% were non-families. 14.7% of all households were made up of individuals, and 6.9% had someone living alone who was 65 years of age or older. The average household size was 2.66 and the average family size was 2.94.

In the township the population was spread out, with 22.8% under the age of 18, 5.9% from 18 to 24, 30.1% from 25 to 44, 28.0% from 45 to 64, and 13.2% who were 65 years of age or older. The median age was 41 years. For every 100 females, there were 99.6 males. For every 100 females age 18 and over, there were 97.9 males.

The median income for a household in the township was $42,212, and the median income for a family was $47,800. Males had a median income of $34,063 versus $21,969 for females. The per capita income for the township was $19,004. About 8.1% of families and 8.8% of the population were below the poverty line, including 12.5% of those under age 18 and 7.0% of those age 65 or over.
