= 2021 Pennsylvania elections =

- November 2, 2021

Elections were held in Pennsylvania on November 2, 2021, to fill judicial positions on the Supreme Court, Superior Court, and Commonwealth Court, to allow judicial retention votes, and to fill numerous county, local and municipal offices.

The necessary primary elections were held on May 18. In addition, special elections for legislative vacancies were held at various times in 2021.

== Special elections ==
=== Pennsylvania State Senate ===
==== 22nd senatorial district ====
On February 14, Democratic state senator John Blake announced he would be resigning from the Senate to take a position with Congressman Matt Cartwright. A special election was announced by Lieutenant Governor (and Senate President) John Fetterman for May 18, in conjunction with the 2021 primary election.

Democrats held a special convention during which State Representative Marty Flynn won the party's nomination. Republicans nominated Lackawanna County Commissioner Chris Chermak. The Libertarian Party nominated Nathan Covington, and the Green Party nominated Marlene Sebastianelli. Flynn defeated the field the special election.

Pennsylvania Senate, District 22 special election, 2021
Party	Candidate	Votes	%
Democratic	Marty Flynn	30,548	51.7
Republican	Chris Chermak	22,465	38.0
Green	Marlene Sebastianelli	5,373	9.1
Libertarian	Nathan Covington	698	1.2
Total votes		59,084	100.0
Democratic hold			

==== 48th senatorial district ====
Following the death of State Senator Dave Arnold, a special election was announced by Lieutenant Governor (and Senate President) John Fetterman to coincide with the 2021 primaries on May 18.

The Libertarian Party nominated York County business owner and farmer Timothy McMaster. Former state representative Edward H. Krebs announced he would launch an independent bid for this seat. Democrats nominated Dr. Calvin Clements, a retired veterinarian. Republicans nominated Lebanon County businessman Christopher Gebhard.

Pennsylvania Senate, District 48 special election, 2021
Party	Candidate	Votes	%
Republican	Chris Gebhard	30,367	62.0
Democratic	Calvin Clements	14,806	30.2
Independent	Edward H. Krebs	2,326	4.7
Libertarian	Timothy McMaster	1,499	3.1
Total votes		48,998	100.0
Republican hold			

=== Pennsylvania House of Representatives ===
==== 59th legislative district ====
Following the death of Republican state representative Mike Reese, House Speaker Bryan Cutler announced that a special election for the 59th legislative district would take place on May 18 (in conjunction with the 2021 primary).

Democrats nominated Ligonier Borough Councilwoman Mariah Fisher. Republicans held a special convention and nominated Leslie Rossi, a Latrobe native and creator of the "Trump House". The Libertarian Party nominated Robb Luther.

Rossi defeated Fisher and Luther in the special election to become the district's first female representative.

Pennsylvania House of Representatives, District 59 special election, 2021
Party	Candidate	Votes	%
Republican	Leslie Rossi	10,538	65.0
Democratic	Mariah Fisher	5,272	32.5
Libertarian	Robb Luther	402	2.5
Total votes		16,015	100.0
Republican hold			

==== 60th legislative district ====
On March 16, State Representative Jeff Pyle announced his retirement due to health issues. House Speaker Bryan Cutler called for a special election for the 60th legislative district on May 18, in conjunction with the 2021 primary.

Republicans nominated Pyle's chief of staff Abby Major. Libertarians nominated Waynesburg University senior Drew Hreha. Democrats nominated Dr. Frank Prazenica Jr., a retired colonel in the United States Army Reserve.

Pennsylvania House of Representatives, District 60 special election, 2021
Party	Candidate	Votes	%
Republican	Abby Major	10,116	72.6
Democratic	Frank C. Prazenica Jr.	3,249	23.3
Libertarian	Andrew Hreha	568	4.1
Total votes		13,933	100.0
Republican hold			

==== 113th legislative district ====
As a result of his State Senate special election victory, Marty Flynn resigned from his State House seat on June 9. House Speaker Bryan Cutler called for a special election for the 113th legislative district on November 2, in conjunction with the 2021 general election.

Democrats nominated Flynn's chief of staff Thom Welby. Republicans nominated Dominick Manetti, a former deputy sheriff of Lackawanna County.

Pennsylvania House of Representatives, District 113 special election, 2021
Party	Candidate	Votes	%
Democratic	Thom Welby	9,191	68.8
Republican	Dominick Manetti	3,698	27.7
Libertarian	Bonnie Flaherty	466	3.5
Total votes		13,355	100.0
Democratic hold			

==== 164th legislative district ====
On July 22, State Representative Margo L. Davidson resigned her seat after being charged with stealing from the Commonwealth by filing fraudulent overnight per diem requests and various other expenses through the State House Comptroller's Office as well as hindering a state prosecution. House Speaker Bryan Cutler called for a special election for the 164th legislative district on November 2, in conjunction with the 2021 general election.

Democrats nominated Upper Darby School District board member Gina Curry. Republicans nominated Brian Sharif Taylor, a United States Army veteran. Libertarians nominated community activist Aniket Josan.

Pennsylvania House of Representatives, District 164 special election, 2021
Party	Candidate	Votes	%
Democratic	Gina Curry	6,469	78.79
Republican	Brian Sharif Taylor	1,528	18.61
Libertarian	Aniket Josan	213	2.59
Total votes		8,210	100.00
Democratic hold			

== Justice of the Supreme Court ==
2021 Pennsylvania Supreme Court election
- November 2, 2021

Nominee	Kevin Brobson	Maria McLaughlin
Party	Republican	Democratic
Popular vote	1,397,100	1,372,182
Percentage	50.45%	49.55%
- County results Brobson: 50–60% 60–70% 70–80% 80–90% McLaughlin: 50–60% 60–70% 80–90%
Justice before election
Thomas Saylor
Republican
Elected Justice
Kevin Brobson
Republican

A seat was up for election due to the impending mandatory retirement of Chief Justice Thomas G. Saylor on December 31, 2021.

=== Democratic primary ===
==== Candidates ====
- Maria McLaughlin, Judge of the Superior Court of Pennsylvania

===== Withdrawn =====
- Carolyn Nichols, Judge of the Superior Court of Pennsylvania

==== Results ====
Democratic primary results
Party	Candidate	Votes	%
Democratic	Maria McLaughlin	945,138	100.0%
Total votes		945,138	100.0%

=== Republican primary ===
==== Candidates ====
- P. Kevin Brobson, President Judge of the Commonwealth Court of Pennsylvania
- Patricia McCullough, Judge of the Commonwealth Court of Pennsylvania
- Paula A. Patrick, Judge of the Philadelphia County Court of Common Pleas

==== Results ====
Primary results by county Brobson: 40%–50%; 50%–60%; 60%–70%; 70%–80%; 80%–90%; McCullough: 40%–50%; 50%–60%; 60%–70%; Patrick: 50%–60%

Republican primary results
Party	Candidate	Votes	%
Republican	Kevin Brobson	505,084	52.21%
Republican	Patricia McCullough	317,975	32.87%
Republican	Paula Patrick	144,291	14.92%
Total votes		967,350	100.0%

=== General election ===
==== Results ====
2021 Pennsylvania Supreme Court election
Party	Candidate	Votes	%
Republican	Kevin Brobson	1,397,100	50.45%
Democratic	Maria McLaughlin	1,372,182	49.55%
Total votes		2,769,282	100.0%
Republican hold			

== Judge of the Superior Court ==
2021 Pennsylvania Superior Court election
- November 2, 2021

Nominee	Megan Sullivan	Timika Lane
Party	Republican	Democratic
Popular vote	1,478,252	1,278,771
Percentage	53.6%	46.4%
- County results Sullivan: 50–60% 60–70% 70–80% 80–90% Lane: 50–60% 70-80%
Judge before election
Susan P. Gantman
Republican
Elected Judge
Megan Sullivan
Republican

One vacancy was created when President Judge Emeritus Susan P. Gantman took senior status on April 1, 2020.

=== Democratic primary ===
==== Candidates ====
- Jill Beck, Allegheny County attorney
- Timika Lane, Judge of the Philadelphia County Court of Common Pleas
- Bryan Neft, Allegheny County attorney

==== Results ====
Primary results by county Lane: 40%–50%; 50%–60%; 70%–80%; 80%–90%; Beck: 40%–50%; 50%–60%; 60%–70%; 70%–80%

Democratic primary results
Party	Candidate	Votes	%
Democratic	Timika Lane	482,433	48.83%
Democratic	Jill Beck	392,205	39.70%
Democratic	Bryan Neft	113,393	11.48%
Total votes		988,031	100.0%

=== Republican primary ===
==== Candidates ====
- Megan Sullivan, deputy Attorney General, former Chester County assistant district attorney (2002–2012)

==== Results ====
Republican primary results
Party	Candidate	Votes	%
Republican	Megan Sullivan	881,046	100.0%
Total votes		881,046	100.0%

=== General election ===
==== Results ====
2021 Pennsylvania Superior Court election
Party	Candidate	Votes	%
Republican	Megan Sullivan	1,478,252	53.62%
Democratic	Timika Lane	1,278,771	46.38%
Total votes		2,757,023	100.0%
Republican hold			

== Judge of the Commonwealth Court ==
2021 Pennsylvania Commonwealth Court election
- November 2, 2021

2 seats of the Commonwealth Court of Pennsylvania
	Majority party	Minority party
Candidate	Stacy Wallace; Drew Crompton	Lori Dumas; David Spurgeon
Party	Republican	Democratic
Last election	7	2
Seats won	1	1
Seat change	▼1	▲1
Popular vote	2,630,344	2,473,227
Percentage	51.54%	48.46%
- County results Republican: 50–60% 60–70% 70–80% 80–90% Democrat: 50–60% 60–70% 80–90%

There were two seats up for election on the Commonwealth Court.

- Judge Mary Hannah Leavitt, a Republican, declined to run for retention for an additional 10-year term. Had Judge Leavitt won retention, she would have only been eligible to serve for one year before her mandatory retirement by December 31, 2022.
- A second seat was up for election due to the retirement of Judge Robin Simpson, a Republican, on December 31, 2019. Governor Tom Wolf appointed Drew Crompton to fill the vacancy, who opted to run for reelection.

=== Democratic primary ===
==== Candidates ====
- Lori Dumas, Judge of the Philadelphia County Court of Common Pleas
- Amanda Green-Hawkins, labor lawyer, former Allegheny County councilwoman (2008–2015)
- David Spurgeon, Judge of the Allegheny County Court of Common Pleas
- Sierra Street, Judge of the Philadelphia County Court of Common Pleas

==== Results ====
Democratic primary results (vote for 2)
Party	Candidate	Votes	%
Democratic	Lori Dumas	517,311	29.70%
Democratic	David Spurgeon	460,769	26.46%
Democratic	Amanda Green-Hawkins	445,400	25.58%
Democratic	Sierra Street	318,017	18.26%
Total votes		1,741,497	100.0%

=== Republican primary ===
==== Candidates ====
- Drew Crompton, incumbent Judge of the Commonwealth Court of Pennsylvania
- Stacy Marie Wallace, private practice attorney, president of the McKean County Bar Association

==== Results ====
Republican primary results (vote for 2)
Party	Candidate	Votes	%
Republican	Stacy Marie Wallace	704,706	50.32%
Republican	Drew Crompton (incumbent)	695,748	49.68%
Total votes		1,400,454	100.0%

=== General election ===
A recount was triggered because Dumas and Crompton finished within half a percentage point of each other in the initial tally. On November 23, counties completed the recount, and Crompton conceded to Dumas. The following day, statewide recount results were published, which affirmed Dumas's lead.

==== Results ====
2021 Pennsylvania Commonwealth Court election (vote for 2)
Party	Candidate	Votes	%
Republican	Stacy Marie Wallace	1,355,445	26.56%
Democratic	Lori Dumas	1,297,253	25.42%
Republican	Drew Crompton (incumbent)	1,274,899	24.98%
Democratic	David Spurgeon	1,175,974	23.04%
Total votes		5,103,571	100.0%
Republican hold			
Democratic gain from Republican			

== Judicial retention ==
=== Superior Court ===
Judges John T. Bender and Mary Jane Bowes were up for retention in 2021.

Judge John T. Bender (R) retention, 2021
Choice	Votes	%
For	1,428,650	62.19
Against	868,407	37.81
Total	2,297,057	100.00
Source: PA Department of State

Judge Mary Jane Bowes (R) retention, 2021
Choice	Votes	%
For	1,447,916	63.31
Against	839,106	36.69
Total	2,287,022	100.00
Source: PA Department of State

=== Commonwealth Court ===
Judges Anne Covey and Renee Cohn Jubelirer were up for retention in 2021.

Judge Anne Covey (R) retention, 2021
Choice	Votes	%
For	1,410,818	61.78
Against	872,863	38.22
Total	2,283,681	100.00
Source: PA Department of State

Judge Renée Cohn Jubelirer (R) retention, 2021
Choice	Votes	%
For	1,426,901	62.75
Against	847,169	37.25
Total	2,274,070	100.00
Source: PA Department of State

== Ballot questions ==
Pennsylvania voters considered three constitutional amendments and one statewide referendum in the May 18 primary.

=== Constitutional amendments ===
==== Restricting emergency disaster declarations and powers ====
In 2020, Governor Tom Wolf declared a disaster emergency for the Commonwealth of Pennsylvania due to the COVID-19 pandemic. Several Republicans, led by state representative Russ Diamond, opposed these public-health measures and introduced two amendments (2021-01 and 2021–02) to the Pennsylvania Constitution to restrict the emergency powers of the governor. Resolutions 2021-01 and 2021-02 were placed on the May primary ballot.

Amendment 1 results by county Yes: 50%–60%; 60%–70%; 70%–80%; No: 50%–60%; 60%–70%

Proposed Constitutional Amendment 1: Termination or Extension of Disaster Emergency Declaration
Choice	Votes	%
For	1,165,851	52.05
Against	1,074,205	47.95
Total	2,240,056	100.00
Source: PA Department of State

Amendment 2 results by county Yes: 50%–60%; 60%–70%; 70%–80%; No: 50%–60%; 70%–80%

Proposed Constitutional Amendment 2: Disaster Emergency Declaration and Management
Choice	Votes	%
For	1,174,528	51.97
Against	1,085,371	48.03
Total	2,259,899	100.00
Source: PA Department of State

==== Racial equality ====
A third constitutional amendment (2021-03) 2021 Pennsylvania Amendment 3 was proposed to create a prohibition against denying an individual's rights because of race or ethnicity. Resolution 2021-03 was included on the May primary ballot.

Amendment 3 results by county Yes: 50%–60%; 60%–70%; 70%–80%; 80%–90%; No: 50%–60%

Proposed Constitutional Amendment 3: Prohibition Against Denial or Abridgement of Equality of Rights Because of Race or Ethnicity
Choice	Votes	%
For	1,629,889	72.31
Against	624,205	27.69
Total	2,254,094	100.00
Source: PA Department of State

=== Statewide referendum ===
Act 91 of 2020 placed before the electorate a question about allowing municipal fire companies, ambulance services, and rescue squads to use loans which are usually only allowed for volunteer companies. The Act 91 referendum was placed on the May primary ballot.

Act 91 referendum results by county Yes: 50%–60%; 60%–70%; 70%–80%; 80%–90%

Statewide Referendum - Act 2020-91
Choice	Votes	%
For	1,629,773	72.89
Against	606,147	27.11
Total	2,235,920	100.00
Source: PA Department of State
