= 2003 Pennsylvania elections =

- November 4, 2003

Elections were held in Pennsylvania on November 4, 2003. Primary elections were held on May 20, 2003.

== Justice of the Supreme Court ==
2003 Pennsylvania Supreme Court election
- November 4, 2003

Candidate	Max Baer	Joan Orie Melvin
Party	Democratic	Republican
Popular vote	1,284,846	1,192,952
Percentage	51.85%	48.15%
- County results Baer: 50–60% 60–70% 70–80% Melvin: 50–60% 60–70% 70–80%
Elected Justice
Max Baer
Democratic

=== Democratic primary ===
==== Candidates ====
- Cheryl Allen, Judge of the Allegheny County Court of Common Pleas
- Max Baer, Judge of the Allegheny County Court of Common Pleas
- James M. DeLeon, Judge of the Philadelphia Municipal Court
- John W. Herron
- James Murray Lynn, Judge of the Philadelphia Court of Common Pleas

==== Results ====
Primary results by county Baer: 20%–30%; 30%–40%; 40%–50%; 50%–60%; 60%–70%; Allen: 30%–40%; 40%–50%; Herron: 20%–30%; DeLeon: 30%–40%

Democratic primary results
Party	Candidate	Votes	%
Democratic	Max Baer	349,920	46.93
Democratic	Cheryl Allen	181,118	24.29
Democratic	John W. Herron	88,515	11.87
Democratic	James M. DeLeon	79,578	10.67
Democratic	James Murray Lynn	46,504	6.24
Total votes		745,635	100.00

=== Republican primary ===
==== Candidate ====
- Joan Orie Melvin, Judge of the Superior Court of Pennsylvania

==== Results ====
Republican primary results
Party	Candidate	Votes	%
Republican	Joan Orie Melvin	581,909	100.00
Total votes		581,909	100.00

=== General election ===
==== Results ====
Pennsylvania Justice of the Supreme Court Election, 2003
Party	Candidate	Votes	%
Democratic	Max Baer	1,284,846	51.85
Republican	Joan Orie Melvin	1,192,952	48.15
Total votes		2,477,798	100.00

== Judge of the Superior Court ==
2003 Pennsylvania Superior Court election
- November 4, 2003

3 seats of the Superior Court of Pennsylvania
	Majority party	Minority party
Candidate	Seamus McCaffery; Jack A. Panella; John Driscoll	Susan Gantman; Grainger Bowman; Palmer Dolbin
Party	Democratic	Republican
Seats won	2	1
Popular vote	3,407,826	3,121,708
Percentage	52.19%	47.81%
- County results Democrat: 50–60% 60–70% 70–80% Republican: 50–60% 60–70% 70–80%

=== Democratic primary ===
==== Candidates ====
- Mark I. Bernstein
- Robert S. Blasi
- John J. Driscoll
- William Manfredi
- Seamus McCaffery, Judge of the Philadelphia Municipal Court
- Jack A. Panella, Judge of the Northampton County Court of Common Pleas
- Claude A. Lord Shields

==== Results ====
Democratic primary results (vote for 3)
Party	Candidate	Votes	%
Democratic	Jack A. Panella	317,213	20.32
Democratic	John J. Driscoll	309,432	19.82
Democratic	Seamus McCaffery	272,572	17.46
Democratic	Claude A. Lord Shields	181,879	11.65
Democratic	Mark I. Bernstein	179,871	11.52
Democratic	William Manfredi	160,030	10.25
Democratic	Robert S. Blasi	140,190	8.98
Total votes		1,561,187	100.00

=== Republican primary ===
==== Candidates ====
- Grainger Bowman
- Palmer Dolbin
- Susan Gantman, lawyer at Cozen O'Connor
- Jacqueline Shogan

==== Results ====
Republican primary results (vote for 3)
Party	Candidate	Votes	%
Republican	Grainger Bowman	437,853	27.65
Republican	Susan Gantman	434,025	27.40
Republican	Palmer Dolbin	368,910	23.29
Republican	Jacqueline Shogan	343,000	21.66
Total votes		1,583,788	100.00

=== General election ===
==== Results ====
Justice of the Superior Court election, 2003
Party	Candidate	Votes	%
Democratic	Seamus McCaffery	1,141,420	17.48
Democratic	Jack A. Panella	1,140,891	17.47
Republican	Susan Gantman	1,125,543	17.24
Democratic	John Driscoll	1,125,515	17.24
Republican	Grainger Bowman	1,017,132	15.58
Republican	Palmer Dolbin	979,033	14.99
Total votes		6,529,534	100.00

== Ballot questions ==
Amending The Right Of Persons Accused Of A Crime To Meet The Witnesses Against Them Face To Face
Choice	Votes	%
For	1,239,356	68.19
Against	578,031	31.81
Total	1,817,387	100.00
Source: PA Department of State

Amendment results by county Yes: 70–80%; 60–70%; 50–60%

Authorizing The General Assembly To Enact Laws Regarding The Way That Children May Testify In Criminal Proceedings
Choice	Votes	%
For	1,494,261	80.57
Against	360,283	19.43
Total	1,854,544	100.00
Source: PA Department of State

Referendum results by county Yes: 80–90%; 70–80%
