= Ferguson v. McKiernan =

- Seal of the Supreme Court of Pennsylvania
- Court: Supreme Court of Pennsylvania
- Full case name: Ivonne V. Ferguson, Appellee v. Joel L. McKiernan, Appellant.
- Decided: December 27, 2007
- Citation: 940 A.2d 1236, 596 Pa. 78

Case history
- Appealed from: Pennsylvania Superior Court

Court membership
- Judges sitting: Cappy, Castille, Nigro, Newman, Saylor, Eakin, Baer

Case opinions
- A sperm donor is not liable to pay child support for children conceived with his sperm even where the sperm donation was not conducted anonymously.
- Decision by: Baer, joined by Cappy and Castille
- Dissent: Saylor
- Dissent: Eakin
- Justices Nigro and Newman took no part in the consideration or decision of the case.

Keywords
- family law child support sperm donor

Ferguson v. McKiernan was a 2007 Pennsylvania Supreme Court case in which, in a 3–2 decision, the court reversed a lower court ruling requiring sperm donor Joel McKiernan to pay child support.

== Factual background ==
Joel McKiernan met Ivonne Ferguson in May 1991, with their relationship becoming intimate several months later. In 1993, Ferguson expressed a desire to have another child. However, after finding out that her tubal ligation was irreversible, Ferguson submitted to in vitro fertilization (IVF) in order to conceive another child. During this process, she asked McKiernan to deliver his sperm so that she could use it for the IVF procedure. While he was initially hesitant to do so, she convinced him by promising that she would not track him down for any child support afterwards.

Ferguson gave birth to male twins (Travis and Tyler) on August 25, 1994. Afterwards, McKiernan mostly maintained his anonymity until Ferguson found his phone number and filed for child support in May 1999.

== Decision and appeals ==
While both a trial and a Superior Court ruled in favor of Ferguson, their ruling was overturned by the Pennsylvania Supreme Court in a 3–2 vote on December 27, 2007. In the majority opinion (joined by Justices Ralph Cappy and Ronald Castille), Justice Max Baer upheld the validity of the verbal contract between Joel McKiernan and Ivonne Ferguson and thus held that McKiernan had no obligation to pay child support.

In his opinion, Justice Baer cited the Uniform Parentage Act and wrote that holding sperm donors responsible for paying child support would make them less likely to donate their sperm, which in turn would limit the reproductive prerogatives of would-be mothers. Justice Baer also noted the spread of unconventional methods of sperm donation in Pennsylvania in recent years. Finally, Baer rejected the causation argument in favor of forcing McKiernan to pay child support and pointed out that, were it not for McKiernan's actions, she would not have had any additional children unless another, anonymous donor had given sperm, and she thus would not have been entitled to any child support. (In response to this, UCLA law professor Russell Korobkin pointed out that, if this logic was taken to the extreme, then it would mean that no children would ever be entitled to any financial support from their parents without their parents' consent since existence for these children is better than non-existence and thus these children weren't actually harmed by being brought into existence.)

== Dissents ==
In their dissents, Justices Thomas Saylor and J. Michael Eakin argued that there is no basis in Pennsylvania public policy for the court's ruling. In his dissent, Justice Saylor argued on separation-of-powers grounds that any new Pennsylvania state government policy in regards to sperm donors and child support, however desirable, should come from the Pennsylvania Legislature rather than from the Pennsylvania judiciary, with the implication that for the Pennsylvania Supreme Court to do otherwise in regards to this would be for it to overstep its designated authority. Meanwhile, in his dissent, Justice Eakin pointed out that relying on the 2002 Uniform Parentage Act is misplaced since this act was not adopted by the Pennsylvania General Assembly (Pennsylvania Legislature).

== See also ==
- Straub v. BMT by Todd
