= 2026 Michigan Proposal 2 =

Proposal 2
- November 3, 2026
- Proposal to prohibit regulated utility companies with $250,000+ in government contracts annually from making campaign contributions to candidates running for or in government offices impacting them

Results
| Choice | Votes | % |
|---|---|---|
| Yes | 3,531,923 | 81.30% |
| No | 812,565 | 18.70% |
| Total votes | 4,344,488 | 100.00% |
- County results Yes 80–90% 70–80%

A referendum on campaign finance reforms took place on November 3, 2026, as part of the 2026 Michigan elections. This referendum is a popular initiative.

== Background ==
Political action committees (PACs) dominate political fundraising in Michigan. Under Michigan law, they are allowed to donate ten times as much money as individuals to political candidates. In 2024, this meant that donations from PACs were capped at $12,250 per candidate, while donations from individuals were limited to $1,225. According to a 2025 report by Bridge Michigan, a nonpartisan news organization, more than 60% of campaign funds came from PACs, while individual donors constituted less than 14% of donations.

In 2023, Michiganders for Money out of Politics (MMOP) spearheaded the Taking Back Our Power initiative with the goal of banning political spending by utilities and government contractors. After the bills they sponsored failed to make it through the legislature in 2023 and 2025, the group switched their focus to a ballot initiative.

MMOP submitted 561,282 signatures to the Board of State Canvassers. This exceeded the 356,958 signatures required, and after staff of the Michigan Bureau of Elections verified that enough of the signatures in a sample of 1,000 were valid, the canvassers voted 3–1 to certify the proposal's signatures.

The approval was challenged by Protect MI Free Speech, a group opposed to the initiative, which claimed that the Bureau of Elections incorrectly calculated the number of valid signatures needed for approval in the sample and that 12 of the approved signatures should not have been accepted. On August 4, the committee asked the Michigan Supreme Court to review their lawsuit by August 20.

Under the state's constitution, popular initiatives are sent to the state legislature to be approved within 40 days of acceptance by the Bureau of Elections. If they are not approved within that period, they are placed on the ballot. The initiative was passed by the Michigan House of Representatives in a 77–26 vote, but the Michigan Senate did not hold a vote within the 40 days, deciding "not [to subvert] the will of the voters" by passing it legislatively, according to Senate Majority Leader Winnie Brinks. Legislative passage allows the proposal to be overturned or amended legislatively.

As a result, the proposal was placed on the 2026 general election ballot.

== Campaign ==
The campaign for this initiative was being pushed by the group Michiganders for Money Out of Politics, a coalition including groups such as Clean Water Action, Community Change Action, Michigan League of Conservation Voters, and Voters Not Politicians.

Protect MI Free Speech, the committee formed to oppose this initiative, received funding from CMS Energy, the parent company of Consumers Energy. The health insurance company Blue Cross Blue Shield of Michigan has also been found to have given money to Protect MI Free Speech.

== Contents ==
This proposal appeared on the ballot as follows:

A proposed initiated law to prohibit campaign contributions from certain regulated utilities and government contractors and apply campaign finance laws and regulations to additional types of political communications.

The proposal would:

- Prohibit regulated electric and gas utilities, contractors with over $250,000 annually in government contracts, and people and organizations with substantial connections to these utilities/contractors from making direct or indirect campaign contributions to those who run for or hold offices that impact them.
- Expand laws regulating spending on political communications, including those requiring disclosing donor information, to apply to communications clearly identifying candidates or ballot questions, even if they do not expressly advocate voting for/against them.
- Expressly apply the law requiring disclosure of who paid for political communications to internet political communications.

Should this proposal be adopted?

== Endorsements ==
Yes

Executive branch officials

- Barack Obama, former president of the United States (2009–2017) (Democratic)

Statewide officials

- Jocelyn Benson, Michigan secretary of state (2019–present) (Democratic)
- Garlin Gilchrist, lieutenant governor of Michigan (2019–present) (Democratic)

State representatives

- Donavan McKinney, HD-11 (2023–present) (Democratic)
- James DeSana, HD-29 (2023–present) (Republican)

Local officials

- Abdul El-Sayed, former Wayne County health director (2023–2025) (Democratic)
- Eli Savit, Washtenaw County prosecuting attorney (2021–present) (Democratic)

Labor unions

- American Federation of Teachers Michigan
- United Auto Workers
- United Farm Workers

Organizations

- 350.org
- Clean Water Action
- Detroit Democratic Socialists of America
- End Citizens United
- Jane Fonda Climate PAC
- Michigan Climate Action Network
- Michigan League of Conservation Voters
- People's Action
- Reproductive Freedom for All
- Sierra Club Michigan
- Stand Up America
- Tides Foundation
- Voters Not Politicians
- Young Democrats of Michigan

Political parties

- Michigan Democratic Party
- Michigan Working Families Party

Newspapers

- Detroit Free Press
- The Michigan Daily
No

Organizations

- Associated Builders and Contractors of Michigan
- Blue Cross Blue Shield of Michigan PAC
- Consumers Energy
- Small Business Association of Michigan

== Results ==
Proposal 2
| Choice | Votes | % |
|---|---|---|
| For | 3,531,923 | 81.30 |
| Against | 812,565 | 18.70 |
| Total | 4,344,488 | 100.00 |

== Aftermath ==
Following the passing of this proposal, two lawsuits were filed against it, arguing that it's unconstitutional and violates the first amendment. One lawsuit was filed by the Mackinac Center for Public Policy, while the other was filed by the companies CMS Energy, its subsidiary Consumers Energy, and DTE Energy. Both lawsuits were filed in the Western District of Michigan district court.

While both lawsuits argue that the proposal violates the first amendment, they go about it in different directions. Mackinac's lawsuit argues that the language used in the proposal is too broad and that they would have a hard time in determining what counts as supporting or opposing candidates. On the other side, The lawsuit filed by the companies argues that restricting their contributions and not letting them participate violates free speech. This lawsuit also argues that the proposal violates the 14th amendment's due process clause by targeting utility companies and people associated with them.
