= 2027 Pennsylvania Supreme Court election =

- November 2, 2027

3 of 7 seats on the Pennsylvania Supreme Court up for election 4 seats needed for a majority
Party	Democratic	Republican	Independent
Current seats	4	2	1
Seats needed	Steady	▲2

The 2027 Pennsylvania Supreme Court election will be held on November 2, 2027, to elect two or three justices to the Supreme Court of Pennsylvania. Incumbent Republican justice Sallie Mundy is up for retention election. Democratic incumbent Christine Donohue is stepping down due to reaching the mandatory retirement age of 75, and Democratic chief justice Debra Todd is expected to retire rather than stand for retention election.

== Partisan election ==
If two seats are up for partisan election, voters will select candidates using plurality block voting. Primary elections will be held on May 18.

=== Democratic primary ===
==== Candidates ====
===== Declared =====
- Lori Dumas, judge of the Pennsylvania Commonwealth Court (2022–present)
- Matthew Wolf, judge of the Pennsylvania Commonwealth Court (2024–present)

===== Potential =====
- Matt Cartwright, former U.S. representative for Pennsylvania's 8th congressional district (2019–2025) & Pennsylvania's 17th congressional district (2013–2019)
- Michael Wojcik, judge of the Pennsylvania Commonwealth Court (2016–present)

== Retention election ==
Sallie Mundy is up for retention election, while chief justice Debra Todd is not expected to stand for retention election.
