= Walter Ogrod case =

1988 child murder resulting in a wrongful conviction

Walter Ogrod
- Born: 1965 (age 60–61)
- Status: Conviction vacated
- Convictions: Premeditated murder (1996); Involuntary deviant sexual intercourse (1996)
- Penalty: Death

Details
- Date apprehended: 1992
- Imprisoned at: State Correctional Institution – Phoenix, Skippack Township, Pennsylvania (Freed on June 5, 2020 after conviction overturned)

Walter Ogrod is an American man who was convicted and sentenced to death for the July 12, 1988, sexual assault and murder of four-year-old Barbara Jean Horn in Philadelphia, Pennsylvania. According to police, Ogrod confessed to Horn's murder four years after it occurred, but in 2020 the "confession" was recognized to be false. On June 5 of that year, Ogrod's conviction was vacated by the Philadelphia Court of Common Pleas and he was ordered to be released from prison. He had spent more than two decades on death row.

== Trials ==
In April 1992, Walter Ogrod, a neighbor of four-year-old Barbara Jean Horn, was coerced into confessing to luring Horn into his basement, attempting to sexually assault her, bludgeoning her to death with a metal object and then placing her body in a cardboard television box on nearby St. Vincent Street.

In October 1993, Ogrod was prosecuted by Philadelphia District Attorney Lynne Abraham for the first time. The defense argued that Ogrod's confession had been coerced by the authorities. The jury was set to acquit Ogrod of the crime, but a single juror announced that he did not agree with the verdict as it was being read, resulting in a mistrial.

In October 1996, Ogrod again went on trial. He was convicted of her murder on October 8, 1996, and sentenced to death the following day. The main evidence against Ogrod was jailhouse informant hearsay testimony that he had confessed to the crime.

In December 2003, the Supreme Court of Pennsylvania affirmed Ogrod's death sentence in an opinion by Justice Sandra Schultz Newman. In April 2004, that court denied Ogrod's application for reargument in an unsigned order, with Justice Thomas G. Saylor writing for the three dissenters.

== Further developments ==
In April 2018, the new Philadelphia District Attorney, Larry Krasner, revealed that Ogrod's conviction would be reviewed. In addition, a district attorney spokesman revealed that prosecutors would no longer try to prevent DNA evidence in the case from being tested, including fingernail scrapings from the victim. DNA testing was concluded in January 2020, with the results definitively excluding Ogrod as the source. In light of the new DNA test results, Krasner filed a motion to have Ogrod's 1996 murder conviction overturned, which was set to go before a judge on March 27, 2020. However, due to the COVID-19 pandemic, it was delayed until June 2020. On June 5, 2020, Ogrod's conviction was vacated by the Philadelphia Court of Common Pleas, and he was ordered to be released from prison. Following his exoneration, Ogrod brought a civil claim against the City of Philadelphia and the homicide detectives who coerced his confession. During the investigation of that case, Ogrod's attorney, Joseph M. Marrone found additional DNA evidence that had never been addressed while Ogrod was in prison. This DNA came from a plastic bag that was used to cover the victim's body in the cardboard box. Although this was a partial DNA sample, it was unequivocally distinguishable from Ogrod's DNA. Despite the District Attorney's work in exonerating Ogrod, the attorney who defended the City and police detectives in the civil case maintained throughout the two-year litigation that Ogrod was guilty. In November 2023, the city agreed to pay Ogrod $9.1 million but never acknowledged any wrongdoing.

== Media coverage ==
The case was featured on a first-season episode of Unsolved Mysteries, aired on November 16, 1988. As implied, at the time the case was unsolved, and there was not yet a clear suspect.

In April 2017, a book by author Thomas Lowenstein, The Trials of Walter Ogrod, was published.

In April 2018, a segment of the documentary series Death Row Stories entitled "Snitch Work" aired, focusing on Ogrod's conviction and possible innocence.

In September 2021, Dateline NBC aired "The Investigation" that showcased how the investigation into Barbara Jean Horn's murder revealed decades of misconduct across Philadelphia's criminal justice system.
