= Francis Kennedy =

Francis Kennedy may refer to:

- H. Francis Kennedy (1918–1995), member of the Pennsylvania House of Representatives
- Francis William Kennedy (1862–1939), Royal Navy officer
