= R. Stanton Wettick Jr. =

American judge

Judge, Court of Common Pleas, Pennsylvania Fifth Judicial District, County of Allegheny
- In office 1976–2016
- Appointed by: Governor Milton Shapp (1976), Elected to 10-year term (1977), Won retention votes to ten-year terms (1987, 1997), Senior Status 2008-2016

Personal details
- Born: April 21, 1938 New Castle, Pennsylvania
- Died: December 21, 2024 (aged 86)
- Education: Amherst College (B.A. 1960); Yale Law School (LL. B. 1963)

Ralph Stanton "Tony" Wettick Jr. was a United States judge who served on the Court of Common Pleas of Allegheny County, Pennsylvania's Fifth Judicial District, from 1976 to 2016. He was a leading authority on discovery under Pennsylvania's Rules of Civil Procedure, was known for handling important and complex cases, and was respected by his peers and Pennsylvania's Supreme Court. As a lawyer and academic, he worked to advance the fair treatment of the poor, racial minorities, and defendants in the criminal proceedings.

== Early life and education ==
Wettick was born on April 21, 1938 in New Castle, Lawrence County, Pennsylvania, and later moved to Sharon, Mercer County. He received a B.A. degree in economics from Amherst College in 1960, and his law degree from Yale University in 1963.

== Legal career ==
=== Lawyer and teacher ===
Wettick was admitted to the Bar of Pennsylvania in 1964. After law school, he was in the private practice of law in Pittsburgh, and became a faculty member at the University of Pittsburgh Law School three years later. He was given partial leave from the law school during the 1969–70 year to serve as Executive Director of the non-profit organization Neighborhood Legal Services Association, which provided legal services to those who could not afford lawyers. He served in that role until being appointed to the Court of Common Pleas. The most noteworthy case during his tenure was the years-long litigation over creation of the General Braddock School District, addressing the issue of institutionalizing segregation in public schools; eventually leading to the creation of the Woodland Hills School District.

=== Judicial service ===
In 1976, Pennsylvania Governor Milton Shapp appointed Wettick to the Allegheny County Court of Common Pleas, Pennsylvania's Fifth Judicial District, located in Pittsburgh, Pennsylvania. This is one of Pennsylvania's trial courts. In 1977, Wettick was elected to the Court of Common Pleas for a ten-year term. He was later successful in retention elections for additional ten-year terms in 1987 and 1997. In 2007, he took senior status at age 69. He retired from the court in 2016 because he reached the mandatory retirement age; not because he wanted to.

Wettick served the court in many capacities, and became especially well known in Allegheny County, and across Pennsylvania's courts, for his rulings on discovery matters. Wettick began his judicial career in the Family Division, eventually becoming its administrative judge; and in 1990, he was assigned to the court's Civil Division, becoming its administrative judge in 2003. He handled thorny and complex cases in the Civil Division, and in 2007, he helped create a specialized business court and complex litigation track, the Commerce and Complex Litigation Center, and was assigned as one of its original judges.

During Wettick's time as a trial court judge serving on the Court of Common Pleas, Pennsylvania's Supreme Court made him chair of its Civil Procedural Rules Committee. In 2003, Pennsylvania's Supreme Court created and adopted new rules of civil procedure to make the judicial process more uniform across Pennsylvania, so the state's lawyers could more easily understand each county court's local practices. In creating these new rules, the Pennsylvania Supreme Court Judicial Council's Committee on Statewide Rules collaborated with the Supreme Court's Civil Procedural Rules Committee chaired by Wettick.

In 2011, Wettick was specially assigned to preside over a case in Philadelphia's First Judicial District, where that judicial district itself along with the Chief Justice of Pennsylvania's Supreme Court were the plaintiffs in the lawsuit; and where he had to address issues such as whether a former Pennsylvania Supreme Court Justice could be subject to a deposition in that case. Another example of the Pennsylvania Supreme Court's respect for Wettick was its citation to a legal opinion by Wettick to support the Supreme Court's opinion in Shafer Electric and Construction vs. Mantia; although appellate courts are not bound by decisions of trial level courts in Pennsylvania.

Wettick also addressed significant legal issues over the years that reached Pennsylvania's Supreme Court. In one case, a majority of Pennsylvania's Supreme Court followed Wettick's decision concerning dismissing cases that a plaintiff failed to actively pursue over a period of years. In another case, involving a dispute over the constitutionality of Pennsylvania's property tax laws, Pennsylvania's Supreme Court agreed with some, though not all, of Wettick's reasoning in addressing the constitutionality of Pennsylvania's real estate assessment laws.

=== Wettick and Pennsylvania discovery practice ===
Wettick may have been most well known for his legal opinions concerning discovery under Pennsylvania's Rules of Civil Procedure, and their impact on other judges and attorneys. Both in Pennsylvania and nationally, for example, his legal opinion in Acri v. Golden Triangle Management Acceptance Company was referenced as a key opinion providing detailed reasons opposing harsh restrictions on attorneys defending depositions that were being imposed by other judges, inside and outside of Pennsylvania, and in federal as well as state courts. His opinions on a wide range of discovery issues were considered important enough as guidance that they have been collected and published as standalone volumes, with opinions from the 1978-1983 period alone being over 400 pages.

In legal cases involving discovery of materials that would usually be protected from disclosure to an opponent because of a privilege, but where those materials had been inadvertently disclosed to the opponent, Wettick's 1995 opinion in Minatronics Corp. v. Buchanan Ingersoll has been influential in Pennsylvania, including in the Supreme Court. In 2012, well after becoming a senior judge, he issued a detailed legal opinion on the scope of discovery permitted of private Facebook content. In 2016, he refined his own earlier influential opinion on discovery in medical malpractice cases.

In 2012, Wettick led the committee that drafted Pennsylvania's rules on electronic discovery, which had significant differences from the federal rules on the same subject.

=== Author and academic ===
Wettick authored an authoritative legal treatise on Pennsylvania civil procedure. Wettick taught at the University of Pittsburgh School of Law before becoming a judge, and after becoming a judge served as an adjunct professor at the University of Pittsburgh School of Law for decades.

In 1964, as a young lawyer, Wettick wrote Modifying Unemployment Compensation Acts to Remove Obstacles to Work Sharing. Also while a lawyer, Wettick co-authored The Effectiveness of State and Local Regulation of Handguns: A Statistical Analysis, for the Duke Law Journal; and Miranda in Pittsburgh—A Statistical Study that was part of an Oxford University Press publication on the impact of United States Supreme Court decisions. In 1970, he authored A Study of the Assignment of Judges to Criminal Cases in Allegheny County – The Poor Fare Worse, for the Dusquesne Law Review.

== Legacy, honors and appointments ==
Future Pennsylvania Supreme Court Justice Max Baer said of Wettick, "He is always impartial, always fair, always dispassionate. He can grasp the most difficult issues or factual situations quickly, and he arrives at correct decisions and fair decisions. He handles a tremendous case load". Other judges, including Baer, would seek advice from Wettick.

Wettick has been appointed to the following positions or received the following awards and honors, among others;

- He received the Everyday Leader Award from the Pennsylvania Bar Association (2006)
- Although sitting in Pittsburgh, Wettick received a lifetime achievement award from the Legal Intelligencer, a daily law journal located in Philadelphia, 300 miles away at the other end of Pennsylvania (2015)
- He received the highest rating for diligence and ranked best for impartiality, legal ability and temperament in a trial lawyers survey by the Allegheny County Bar Association (1997)
- Wettick was a member of the Supreme Court of Pennsylvania's Civil Procedural Rules Committee, including his designation by the Supreme Court as committee vice-chair and chair (1992-2016)
- Wettick served as chair of the following: the Pennsylvania Supreme Court's Domestic Relations Committee, the Pennsylvania Juvenile Court Judges Commission, the Ad Hoc Medical Malpractice Committee to Chief Justice Ralph J. Cappy, and the Three-Judge Coordinating Court for Silicone Implant Litigation
- In October 2024, courtroom 815 of the Allegheny County Courthouse was dedicated in Wettick’s honor
- The Civil Litigation Section of the Allegheny County Bar Association established the Wettick Award at the University of Pittsburgh School of Law to be given annually to the student attaining the highest grade in the school's Pennsylvania Practice course

== Personal life and death ==
Wettick died on December 21, 2024. He was survived by his wife Dr. Nancy Hazlett (a psychiatrist); three children, his daughter Caroline having predeceased him in 2000; and four grandchildren.
