= Slay the Dragon =

2019 documentary film about gerrymandering

- Film poster
- Directed by: Barak Goodman; Chris Durrance
- Cinematography: Sam Russell
- Edited by: Seth Bomse
- Music by: Gary Lionelli
- Production company: Participant
- Distributed by: Magnolia Pictures
- Release dates: April 27, 2019 (Tribeca); April 3, 2020 (United States)
- Running time: 101 minutes
- Country: United States
- Language: English

Slay the Dragon is a 2019 American documentary film about gerrymandering in the United States from Los Angeles, California-based film production company Participant, directed by Barak Goodman and Chris Durrance. The film, which premiered at the Tribeca Film Festival on April 27, 2019, follows citizens' groups as they work to end the practice of gerrymandering, which they see as undermining democracy. It features Katie Fahey, the activist who founded Voters Not Politicians and led a successful grassroots campaign to ban partisan gerrymandering in Michigan.

== Critical reception ==
On Rotten Tomatoes, the film currently holds a 100% rating based on 48 reviews with an average score of 7.7/10. The site's consensus declares that "Slay the Dragon takes a suitably outraged -- but ultimately optimistic -- look at modern-day gerrymandering that doubles as a heartfelt call to action."

The film has received positive reviews from several critics, including Owen Gleiberman of Variety, who called it "incisive and stirring" and "the most important political film of the year"; Chuck Foster of Film Threat, who called it "educational, inspirational, exciting and, most importantly, interesting"; and Caroline Cao of SlashFilm, who calls it a "tough but necessary documentary about the decay of democracy."

== See also ==
- REDMAP, Republican Party's Redistricting Majority Project, est. 2010
- Ratf**ked
