= Keith Naughton =

American political consultant

- Occupation: Political consultant
- Known for: Political campaigns in Pennsylvania; managing campaigns for Susan Gantman and J. Michael Eakin
- Political party: Republican

Keith Naughton is a Republican political consultant.

He worked as campaign manager for Bruce Castor during the early stages of his campaign for Pennsylvania Attorney General. After Castor began attacking Pennsylvania Republican National Committee Robert B. Asher, Naughton stepped down.

In 2003, he managed the Susan Gantman's campaign for Pennsylvania Superior Court, the only statewide Republican victory that year. He also managed both statewide judicial campaigns for J. Michael Eakin. He was named to the PoliticsPA list of "Pennsylvania's Top Operatives" in 2003

In an op-ed to The Hill, he expresses distrust of the modern pediatric psychiatry, alleging profit-motivated over-diagnosis and over-treatment of autism and ADHD, and similar profit motivations for the treatments promoted by what he refers to as "transgenderism".
