= Sandra Schultz Newman =

American judge (1938–2026)

Justice of the Pennsylvania Supreme Court
- In office January 1, 1996 – December 31, 2006
- Preceded by: Nicholas Papadakos
- Succeeded by: James J. Fitzgerald III

Judge of the Pennsylvania Commonwealth Court
- In office January 17, 1994 – December 31, 1995
- Preceded by: Madaline Palladino
- Succeeded by: Bonnie Leadbetter

Personal details
- Born: Sandra Schultz; November 4, 1938
- Died: February 4, 2026 (aged 87)
- Party: Republican
- Education: Drexel University; Temple University; Villanova University School of Law
- Occupation: Attorney

Sandra Schultz Newman (November 4, 1938 – February 2, 2026) was an American justice of the Pennsylvania Supreme Court.

== Career ==
Schultz Newman was the first female Assistant District Attorney in Montgomery County and was licensed to practice in Pennsylvania and New York. She was first elected to the Pennsylvania Commonwealth Court in 1993. In 1995, she was elected to the State Supreme Court, becoming the court's first female justice. After retiring at the end of 2006, she maintained a private law practice in Alternative Dispute Resolution. She also prepared lawyers for mock appellate arguments.

=== Ogrod case ===
Schultz Newman wrote the Supreme Court of Pennsylvania decision affirming the murder conviction of Walter Ogrod which had no dissent. Ogrod was later exonerated after being incarcerated for 28 years. In April 2004, that court denied Ogrod's application for reargument in an unsigned order, with Justice Thomas G. Saylor writing for the three dissenters.

== Personal life and death ==
Schultz Newman and her husband had two sons. She died on February 2, 2026, at the age of 87.

== Recognition ==
Schultz Newman received the Medallion of Achievement Award from Villanova University School of Law, the Anne X. Alpern Award from the Pennsylvania Bar Association, and four Honorary Doctorate Degrees. She was also a recipient of the Drexel 100 Award, recognizing her as one of Drexel University's 100 outstanding alumni, and she was designated a Distinguished Daughter of Pennsylvania. She was one of the founders of the new Drexel University College of Law, and served on its Board of Overseers, and she was on the executive board of Trustees of Drexel's College of Medicine from 2002.
