= Madaline Palladino =

American judge (1924-2015)

Judge of the Commonwealth Court of Pennsylvania
- Appointed by: Governer Dick Thornburgh
- Preceded by: James S. Bowman
- Succeeded by: Sandra Schultz Newman

Personal details
- Born: May 24, 1924 Allentown, Pennsylvania
- Died: November 9, 2015 (aged 91)
- Party: Republican
- Education: University of Pennsylvania; Columbia Law School

Madaline Palladino (May 5, 1924 – November 9, 2015) was an American lawyer and jurist who served as a judge of the Pennsylvania Commonwealth Court. Palladino was the first Republican women elected to a statewide office in Pennsylvania.

== Early life and education ==
Palladino was born in Allentown, Pennsylvania on May 24, 1924, to Italian immigrants Joseph and Angelina Palladino. She graduated as salutatorian of Allentown High School in 1941. Palladino attended the University of Pennsylvania, and earned her law degree from Columbia Law School.

== Career ==
Palladino practiced law for over 30 years in Lehigh County, where it was erroneously claimed that she was the first female lawyer in the county.

Palladino joined the staff of District Attorney George Joseph in 1960, making her the first female assistant district attorney in Lehigh County. Palladino was also the first female assistant solicitor for the City of Allentown.

In October 1980, Palladino was appointed to the Pennsylvania Commonwealth Court by Governor Dick Thornburgh following the death of President Judge James S. Bowman. Palladino served until January 1982, when she was replaced by former state representative Joseph T. Doyle. She was reelected for a ten year term in 1983, and served until January 1994. She was succeeded by Sandra Schultz Newman.

Following her retirement, the Lehigh County Board of Commissioners voted to rename the gold courtroom of the Old Lehigh County Courthouse in Palladino's honor.
