= Kevin Brobson =

American judge (born 1970)

Justice of the Pennsylvania Supreme Court
- Incumbent
- Assumed office January 3, 2022
- Preceded by: Thomas Saylor

Personal details
- Born: Paul Kevin Brobson; November 26, 1970 (age 55) Montoursville, Pennsylvania, U.S.
- Party: Republican
- Education: Lycoming College (BS); Widener University (JD)

Paul Kevin Brobson (born November 26, 1970) is a justice of the Supreme Court of Pennsylvania. In 2009, he was elected to serve as a judge on the Commonwealth Court of Pennsylvania, where he served until 2022.

== Childhood ==
Brobson was born in Montoursville, Pennsylvania.

== Education ==
Brobson graduated from Lycoming College with a Bachelor of Arts in Accounting and Economics magna cum laude in 1992 and earned his Juris Doctor from Widener University Commonwealth Law School summa cum laude in 1995.

== Legal work experience ==
Brobson was a law clerk for the Honorable James McGirr Kelly of the United States District Court for the Eastern District of Pennsylvania from 1995 to 1996. He was then an attorney at Buchanan, Ingersoll & Rooney law firm in Pittsburgh, Pennsylvania from 1996 to 2009. In addition to his role as an appellate judge, he served as Widener University Commonwealth Law School jurist-in-residence from 2016 to 2018.

== Judicial career ==
Brobson served on the Commonwealth Court of Pennsylvania from 2010 to 2022. In the 2021 general election, he was the Republican nominee to fill the vacancy on the Supreme Court of Pennsylvania left by the mandatory retirement of Chief Justice Thomas G. Saylor; Brobson narrowly defeated the Democratic nominee, Pennsylvania Superior Court Judge Maria McLaughlin and was sworn in on January 3, 2022.

Legal offices
Preceded by Thomas Saylor	Justice of the Supreme Court of Pennsylvania; 2022–present	Incumbent
