= Mauree Gingrich =

American politician (born 1946)

Mauree A. Gingrich
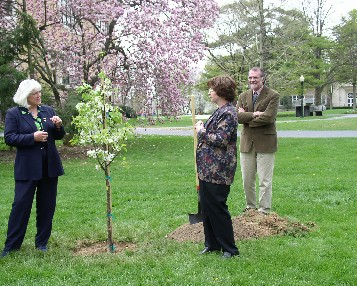

Member of the Pennsylvania House of Representatives from the 101st district
- In office January 7, 2003 – January 3, 2017
- Preceded by: Edward H. Krebs
- Succeeded by: Frank Ryan

Personal details
- Born: July 10, 1946 (age 80) Baltimore, Maryland
- Party: Republican
- Spouse: Calvin B. Gingrich
- Education: Hershey Junior College; Harrisburg Institute of Medical Arts

Mauree A. Gingrich (born July 10, 1946) is an American politician who served as a Republican member of the Pennsylvania House of Representatives for the 101st District.

The Lititz Record described her as a champion of "legislation to protect children, the elderly, the physically and mentally handicapped and victims of domestic violence."

== Formative years and family ==
Born on July 10, 1946, in Baltimore, Maryland, Gingrich graduated from Lebanon Catholic High School in Lebanon, Pennsylvania, in 1964. After attending Hershey Junior College from 1964 to 1965, she earned her A.S. degree in medical technology in 1967 at the Harrisburg Institute of Medical Arts (now the Pennsylvania College of Medical Arts). She also participated in the Weber, Levin and O'Malley Sales Development Program.

Previously a resident of Palmyra, Pennsylvania, Gingrich now lives in Hershey, Pennsylvania, with her husband, Calvin B. Gingrich. She has four children and seven grandchildren.

== Career ==
Employed as the regional marketing director for Omega Medical Laboratory in Wyomissing, Pennsylvania, from 1985 to 1987, Gingrich was then hired as a marketing associate for Cornwall Manor in 1987, and was then promoted to director of marketing for the organization during the mid-1990s, serving in that capacity until 1998, when she opened her own business, Mature Market Concepts, a qualitative market research company that she owned and operated from 1998 to 2002.

During this same period of her professional life, she served as a member of the Palmyra Civil Service Commission from 1987 to 1989. Elected to the Palmyra borough council in 1989, she served as a council member from January 1990 until 2001, and was the borough council president from 1994 through 2001.

Elected to the Pennsylvania House of Representatives in 2002, she served during the 2003 term, and was subsequently elected to six additional, consecutive terms. She served on the House Aging and Older Adult Services, Appropriations, and Health and Human Services.

Appointed to the Pennsylvania Public Television Network Commission, she served in that capacity from 2003 to 2004, and was then appointed to the Local Government Committee, a post she held from 2005 to 2016. From 2007 to 2008, she served as the House deputy whip.

In April 2016, Gingrich sponsored a Pennsylvania House resolution requiring the Pennsylvania Joint State Government Commission "to examine whether 'blind spots' or current gaps" existed in Pennsylvania's Protection from Abuse (PFA) law, which allowed domestic violence victims to seek restraining orders to prevent abusers from pursuing further contact with them, and report its findings to the Pennsylvania General Assembly. Gingrich explained that she authored the resolution in response to the Labor Day murder of South Lebanon Township resident, Stacy Pennington, who had been shot and killed near her workplace by a former boyfriend, despite Pennington's having obtained a PFA order. Unanimously approved by the Pennsylvania House, the resolution resulted in a report by the commission to the general assembly in late November of that same year, which "noted the biggest gap in the law concerns [abusers'] ability to still get their hands on a gun," and recommended "either narrowing the list of people who can serve as third-party safekeepers of a defendant's weapons or ... giving courts the power to issue search-and-seizure orders for guns as part of PFA orders and ending a family exemption from background checks for transfers of handguns." According to Gingrich:

"The recommendations address the safety of victims while a PFA is being served on an abuser, and help to ensure that these violent defendants do not possess, or have access to, weapons that may be used against their victims. It also urges courts to use risk assessment tools to evaluate the risk to victims of allowing bail for defendants who violate a PFA order by means of physical violence. No action can prevent perpetrators who are mentally ill or otherwise psychologically determined to harm or kill a former partner from acting on those urges—particularly if they are suicidal. However, it is my hope that the commission's report will result in legislation to prevent these violent deaths."

Chair of the House Labor and Industry Committee in 2016, Gingrich also sponsored House Bill 476 in June of that same year to mandate that hospitals "create and apply nurse staffing standards, partially by having nurses on the staffing committee."

She was not a candidate for reelection to the Pennsylvania House, choosing to retire from her seat in 2016.

From 2017 t0 2018, she served on the board of trustees for the Harrisburg Area Community College.

=== Awards and other honors ===
Recognized by the Lebanon County Federation of Women's Clubs with its Outstanding Clubwoman Award, Gingrich was also honored by the Harrisburg Diocese with its Commissionary Award for outstanding church council work. The recipient, for fourteen consecutive years, of the National Federation of Independent Business's Guardian of Small Business Award, she was also honored by the Lebanon County Sexual Assault Resource Counseling Center (SARCC) with its Children's Hero Award.

In June 2016, Gingrich was named legislator of the year by the ARC of Pennsylvania.

== Community service ==
During the 1980s, Gingrich was a member of the Palmyra Junior Woman's Club, and chaired the Lebanon County Federation of Women's Clubs, the Chemical People Task Force's political action committee, and the Holy Spirit Church council, and was a member of the Lebanon Valley Chamber of Commerce and its Women in Business Committee, as well as the Lebanon Valley Sertoma Club.

She was also a founding member of the Lebanon County Commission for Women.

In addition, Gingrich helped to design and staff the Hershey Medical Center's volunteer service for in-patient use of its Jamie's Place program, and volunteered with the hearing impairments educational outreach component of the Lebanon-Lancaster Intermediate Unit's LEAP Program.
