= Ratf**ked =

Book about US Republican gerrymandering

Ratf**ked: The True Story Behind the Secret Plan to Steal America's Democracy
- First edition
- Author: David Daley
- Language: English
- Subject: Gerrymandering in the United States
- Genre: Nonfiction
- Publisher: Liveright Publishing Corporation/W. W. Norton & Company
- Publication date: 2016
- Publication place: United States
- Pages: 256
- OCLC: 1005838868

Ratf**ked: The True Story Behind the Secret Plan to Steal America's Democracy is a 2016 book by David Daley that discusses efforts by Republican political operatives, including Karl Rove, Ed Gillespie and Chris Jankowski, to exploit redistricting processes around the United States in order to gain greater control of the American Congress, under a project called REDMAP. Daley describes the effects on six states: Pennsylvania, North Carolina, Michigan, Ohio, Florida and Wisconsin. Daley was the editor-in-chief of the online publication Salon.

== Reception ==
Ratf**ked received largely positive reviews. Alex Wagner of The New York Times called it "disheartening and enraging in equal measure—and also occasionally dull"; Elizabeth Kolbert of The New Yorker called it "compelling"; Elizabeth Drew of The New York Review of Books called it "sobering and convincing"; and Julian E. Zelizer of The Washington Post described it as an "eye-opening tour of a process that many Americans never see" but also called it "punchy, though overstated."

== See also ==
- Gill v. Whitford
- Slay the Dragon (2019 documentary)
