= Straub v. BMT by Todd =

Indiana Supreme Court case

Straub v. BMT by Todd was a 1994 case of the Indiana Supreme Court which, in a 4–1 decision, ruled that a custodial parent cannot bargain away a child's right to financial support even with a pre-sexual intercourse contract. Justice Roger Owen DeBruler dissented, arguing that a transfer of one's child support obligations to another party (assuming that the other party is actually capable of paying the other share of child support in another's place, that is) should be viewed as being permissible just like a transfer of one's liability for negligence through liability insurance is permissible (again, assuming that the other party can actually pay this in another's place).

== Background ==
In 1986, elementary school teachers Francine Todd and Edward Straub engaged in a romantic relationship with a sexual component. In December 1986, Francine Todd informed Edward Straub of her desire to have a child without getting married. Edward Straub, who already had five children with his previous wife, was reluctant to impregnate Todd, but changed his mind once she threatened to break off their relationship. So, Straub and Todd had a pre-sex agreement, in Todd's handwriting, not to seek child support from Straub for any resulting pregnancy, after which point Straub impregnated Todd through sexual intercourse, resulting in the birth of their daughter B.M.T. On January 7, 1991, Todd sued to have Straub be listed as B.M.T.'s father and to force Straub to pay child support for B.M.T.

== Ruling ==
In its ruling, the Indiana Supreme Court said that Straub's and Todd's contact was null, void, and unenforceable as a matter of public policy. Specifically, it argued that Straub could not have been a sperm donor since he reproduced by sexual intercourse rather than by artificial insemination and that parents cannot legally bargain away their children's right to financial support. This ruling was written by Chief Justice Shepard and was joined by Justices Givan, Dickson, and Sullivan.

== Justice DeBruler's dissent ==
In a short but succinct dissent, Justice Roger Owen DeBruler agreed with the majority that a parent cannot legally bargain away their child's right to financial support but also argued that in spite of the fact that one cannot contract away one's liability for negligence, the government nevertheless allows people to purchase liability insurance. DeBruler pointed out that if people's liability insurance coverage was inadequate, then these people would themselves pay out of pocket, but that it would nevertheless be inappropriate for the judiciary to strike down liability insurance by invoking a public policy imposing liability for negligence. DeBruler thus argued that if Todd is actually able to pay Straub's share of child support, then she should indeed be legally required to do so considering that she previously agreed and promised to do so. DeBruler also invoked Judge Linda Chezem's opinion in this case from the Indiana Court of Appeals in regards to the proper procedure for making certain that B.M.T. receives adequate financial support.

== See also ==
- Ferguson v. McKiernan
