= John A. Schlegel =

American politician

Member of the Pennsylvania House of Representatives from the 101st district
- Incumbent
- Assumed office January 3, 2023
- Preceded by: Frank Ryan

Personal details
- Born: 1958 (age 67–68)
- Party: Republican
- Spouse: Ruth Ann Schlegel
- Education: Kutztown University of Pennsylvania B.S. Millersville University of Pennsylvania M. Ed; Temple University D. Ed
- Occupation: Educator
- Website: repschlegel.com

John A. Schlegel is an American politician currently representing the 101st district of the Pennsylvania House of Representatives as a Republican.

== Early life ==
Schlegel attended the J. P. McCaskey High School in Lancaster, Pennsylvania graduating as part of their class of 1973. He attended Kutztown University of Pennsylvania graduating as part of their class of 1977 with a Bachelor of Science in social studies. He attended Millersville University of Pennsylvania earning a Master of Education in counselor education in 1981. He then attended Temple University to earn his Doctor of Education in School Administration in 2000.

Schlegel worked extensively as an educator, first as an American history teacher and coach for the Northern Lebanon School District. He was the assistant principal of the Steelton-Highspire high school. He was also the Principal of the Palmyra High School and Swatara Junior High School. Lastly, he worked as director of secondary education at Cornwall-Lebanon School District before retiring.

== Political career ==
Schlegel came out of retirement to run for the 101st district of the Pennsylvania House of Representatives as a Republican following the retirement of longtime representative Frank Ryan. He ran on a campaign of reducing state spending, ensuring election integrity, improving public schools and welfare facilities for senior citizens, as well as protecting Freedom of Speech and the Right to Bear Arms. Additionally, Schlegel received a "favorable" score from the Pennsylvania Pro-Life Federation and supporting repealing PA Act 77, a series of Amendments to the state election code, and proposed having voter-ID be a requirement to vote. He does not support increasing the state minimum wage, since most businesses already pay higher than the minimum wage. Schlegel would handily defeat his Democratic opponent Catherine "Cavi" Miller with 14,014 votes to her 8,483. Schlegel opened his district office in the Lebanon Valley Mall.

== Personal life ==
Schlegel is married to Ruth Ann Schlegel. They have two sons, and five grandchildren. He is involved in several charities including the American Heart Association and is a member of the United Methodist Church.

== Election results ==
PA House election, 2022: Pennsylvania House, District 147
Party	Candidate	Votes	%
Republican	John A. Schlegel	14,072	61.5%
Democratic	Cavi Miller	8,569	37.5%
Margin of victory		5,503	24%
Turnout		22,641	100%
