= James M. Burd =

American politician

Member of the Pennsylvania House of Representatives from the 12th district
- In office 1977–1990
- Preceded by: James A. Green
- Succeeded by: Patricia Carone

Personal details
- Born: March 31, 1931 Butler County, Pennsylvania
- Died: March 18, 2013 (aged 81) Saxonburg, Pennsylvania
- Party: Republican
- Occupation: Legislator

James M. Burd (March 31, 1931 – March 18, 2013) was a Republican member of the Pennsylvania House of Representatives.
