= James A. Green (Pennsylvania politician) =

American politician

Member of the Pennsylvania House of Representatives from the 12th district
- In office 1975–1976
- Preceded by: H. Francis Kennedy
- Succeeded by: James M. Burd

Personal details
- Born: James Allison Green; October 24, 1930 Evans City, Pennsylvania
- Died: June 6, 2011 (aged 80) Pittsburgh, Pennsylvania
- Party: Democratic
- Spouse: Margaret Loretta Pryor
- Children: Beth Margaret Green, Fred Green
- Occupation: Slippery Rock Borough, Butler county and Pennsylvania state government

Military service
- Branch/service: United States Air Force

James Allison Green (October 24, 1930 – June 6, 2011) was a former Democratic member of the Pennsylvania House of Representatives.

He was born in Evans City, Butler County, Pennsylvania to Fred Allison and Ioda Pearl Barkley Green.

He died at a hospital in Pittsburgh in 2011.
