= Frank Ryan (politician) =

American politician

Frank Xavier Ryan
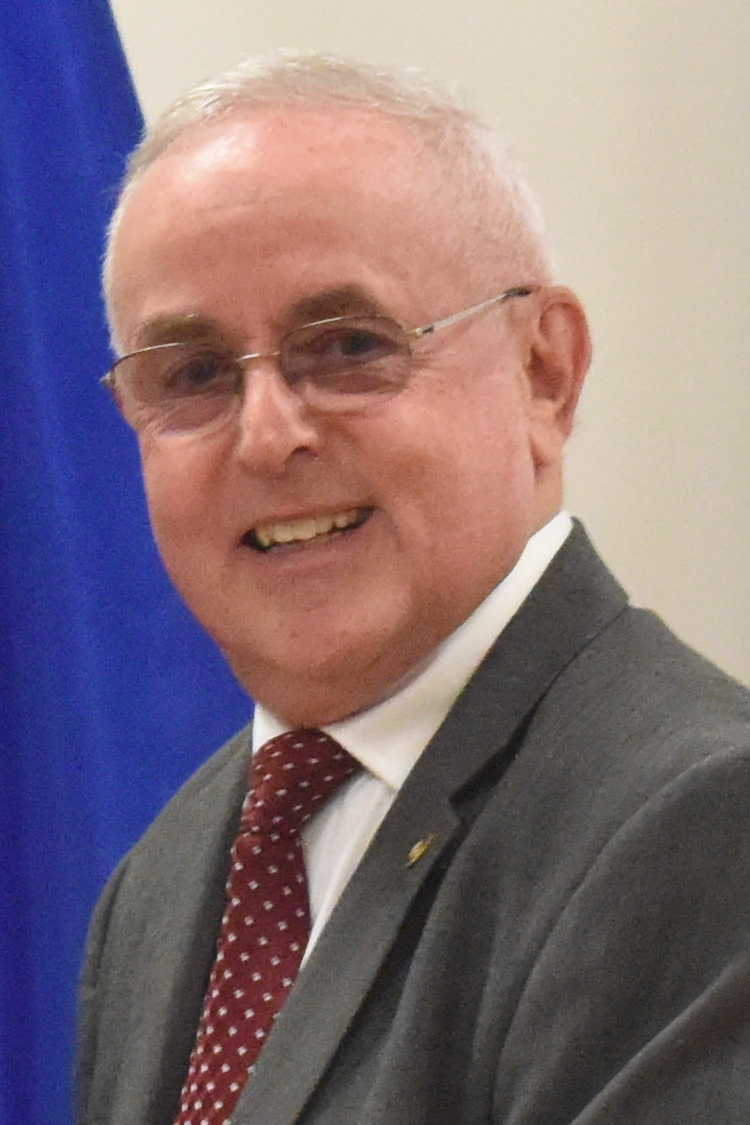

Member of the Pennsylvania House of Representatives from the 101st district
- In office January 3, 2017 – November 30, 2022
- Preceded by: Mauree Gingrich
- Succeeded by: John A. Schlegel

Personal details
- Born: May 1, 1951 (age 75) Baltimore, Maryland, U.S.
- Party: Republican
- Spouse: Sherrie
- Children: 4
- Education: Mount St. Mary's University (BA); University of Maryland (MBA)
- Alma mater: Fairfield High School

Military service
- Allegiance: United States
- Branch/service: United States Marine Corps
- Years of service: 1969-2002; 2004-2005
- Rank: Colonel
- Unit: United States Marine Corps Reserve; Multi-National Force – Iraq
- Battles/wars: Operation Enduring Freedom; Iraq War

Francis Xavier Ryan (born May 1, 1951) is an American politician, accountant, and retired military officer who served as a member of the Pennsylvania House of Representatives for the 101st District from 2017 to 2022.

== Early life and education ==
Ryan was born on May 1, 1951, in Baltimore, Maryland. He graduated from Fairfield High School in 1969. Ryan graduated summa cum laude with a Bachelor of Arts degree from Mount St. Mary's University in 1973, and a Master of Business Administration from the University of Maryland in 1977. He is a Certified Public Accountant.

== Military service ==
Ryan began his service in the United States Marine Corps Reserve in 1969, and retired at the rank of colonel in 2002. He was recalled to active duty in 2004, serving with the Multi-National Force – Iraq until the following year. He had previously served as Central Command Special Operations Officer during Operation Enduring Freedom in 2002. In total Ryan received three Legions of Merit, the Bronze Star Medal, the Defense Meritorious Service Medal, the Navy Commendation Medal, and the United States Army Commendation Medal.

== Political career ==
Ryan worked for Pat Toomey's first United States Senate campaign. He also worked at the Pennsylvania Department of Labor & Industry and the U.S. Department of Labor.

=== Pennsylvania House of Representatives ===
Ryan was first elected to represent the 101st District in the Pennsylvania House of Representatives in 2016, and won re-election in 2018 and 2020.

Following the 2020 United States presidential election, Ryan supported false claims of massive voter fraud, pushing a discredited claim that there were more votes than voters in Pennsylvania. He was also one of 26 Pennsylvania House Republicans who called for the reversal of Joe Biden's certification as the winner of Pennsylvania's electoral votes.

In 2021, he proposed an amendment to a bill whereby only elected officials in Philadelphia, a Democratic stronghold, could be recalled. Prior to Ryan's amendment, the bill allowed for recalls of elected officials statewide.

In 2022, Ryan announced he would not seek reelection to a fourth term.

He is a member of the Pennsylvania Freedom Caucus.

== Personal life ==
Ryan is married to his wife, Sherrie. He has four children and nine grandchildren.

== Electoral history ==
Pennsylvania's 17th Congressional District Republican primary election, 2004
| Party | Candidate | Votes | % |
|---|---|---|---|
| Republican | Scott Paterno | 19,258 | -- |
| Republican | Ron Hostetler | 15,370 | -- |
| Republican | William B. Lynch | 12,172 | -- |
| Republican | Susan C. Helm | 9,128 | -- |
| Republican | Frank Ryan | 9,061 | -- |
| Republican | Mark Stewart | 6,935 | -- |

Pennsylvania's 17th Congressional District Republican primary election, 2010
| Party | Candidate | Votes | % |
|---|---|---|---|
| Republican | Dave Argall | 20,585 | 32 |
| Republican | Frank Ryan | 19,656 | 31 |
| Republican | Josh First | 14,860 | 23 |
| Republican | Allen Griffith | 8,376 | 13 |

2016 Pennsylvania House of Representatives Republican primary election, District 101
| Party | Candidate | Votes | % |
|---|---|---|---|
| Republican | Frank Ryan | 3,913 | 36.06 |
| Republican | Pier Hess | 3,200 | 29.49 |
| Republican | Jeffrey Griffith | 3,047 | 28.08 |
| Republican | John Dissinger | 677 | 6.24 |
| Write-in | | 15 | 0.15 |
| Total votes | | 10,852 | 100.00 |

2016 Pennsylvania House of Representatives election, District 101
| Party | Candidate | Votes | % |
|---|---|---|---|
| Republican | Frank Ryan | 19,800 | 66.91 |
| Democratic | Lorraine Scudder | 9,752 | 32.96 |
| Write-in | | 39 | 0.13 |
| Total votes | | 29,591 | 100.0 |

2018 Pennsylvania House of Representatives election, District 101
| Party | Candidate | Votes | % |
|---|---|---|---|
| Republican | Frank Ryan | 15,512 | 64.41 |
| Democratic | Cesar Liriano | 8,553 | 35.51 |
| Write-in | | 20 | 0.08 |
| Total votes | | 24,085 | 100.00 |

2020 Pennsylvania House of Representatives election, District 101
| Party | Candidate | Votes | % |
|---|---|---|---|
| Republican | Frank Ryan | 21,611 | 62.74 |
| Democratic | Calvin Clements | 12,792 | 37.14 |
| Write-in | | 41 | 0.12 |
| Total votes | | 34,444 | 100.0 |
