= Pennsylvania House of Representatives, District 101 =

American legislative district

Pennsylvania's 101st State House of Representatives district
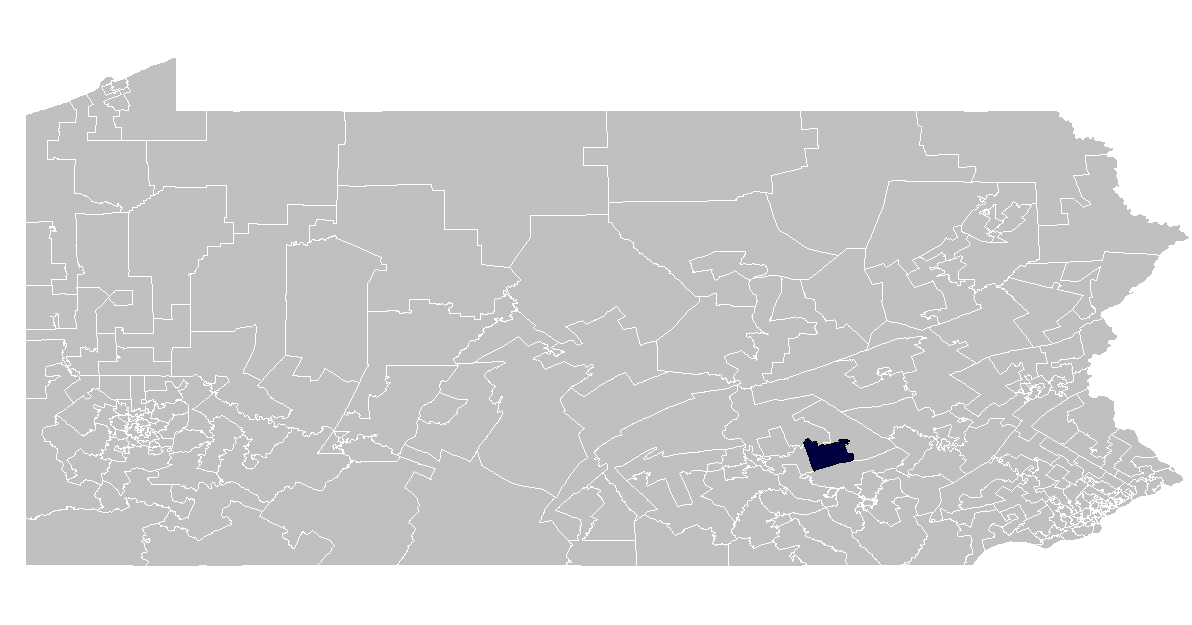
Representative
John A. Schlegel; R–Cornwall
- Demographics: 86.5% White; 3.2% Black; 15.0% Hispanic
- Population (2011) • Citizens of voting age: 64,543; 49,480

The 101st Pennsylvania House of Representatives District is located in Southeastern Pennsylvania and has been represented since 2023 by John A. Schlegel.

== District profile ==
The 101st Pennsylvania House of Representatives District is located in Lebanon County. It includes the Josiah Funck Mansion. It is made up of the following areas:

- Cornwall
- Lebanon
- North Cornwall Township
- North Lebanon Township
- South Lebanon Township
- West Cornwall Township
- West Lebanon Township

== Representatives ==
Representative	Party	Years	District home	Note
Before 1969, seats were apportioned by county.
H. Jack Seltzer	Republican	1969 – 1980		
George W. Jackson	Republican	1981 – 1990		
Edward H. Krebs	Democrat	1991 – 1993		Switched parties in 1993
Edward H. Krebs	Republican	1993 – 2002		
Mauree A. Gingrich	Republican	2003 – 2016	Palmyra	
Frank Ryan	Republican	2016 – 2023		
John A. Schlegel	Republican	2023 – Incumbent		Incumbent

== Recent election results ==
PA House election, 2010: Pennsylvania House, District 101
Party	Candidate	Votes	%	±%
Republican	Mauree A. Gingrich	12,768	70.33	
Democratic	Patricia Stephens	3,793	20.89	
Margin of victory		8,975	49.44	
Turnout		16,561	100	

PA House election, 2012: Pennsylvania House, District 101
Party	Candidate	Votes	%	±%
Republican	Mauree A. Gingrich	20,618	100	
Margin of victory		20,618	100	
Turnout		20,618	100	

PA House election, 2014: Pennsylvania House, District 101
Party	Candidate	Votes	%	±%
Republican	Mauree A. Gingrich	12,138	71.67	
Democratic	Patricia Stephens	4,799	28.33	
Margin of victory		7,339	43.34	▼56.66
Turnout		16,937	100	

PA House election, 2016: Pennsylvania House, District 101
Party	Candidate	Votes	%	±%
Republican	Frank Ryan	19,800	67.0	
Democratic	Lorraine Scudder	9,752	33.0	
Margin of victory		10,048	34	▼9.34
Turnout		29,552	100	
