= Patricia Carone =

American politician

Member of the Pennsylvania House of Representatives from the 12th district
- In office 1991–1998
- Preceded by: James M. Burd
- Succeeded by: Daryl Metcalfe

Personal details
- Born: Patricia Ann Stone; March 21, 1943 (age 83) Greenville, Pennsylvania
- Party: Democrat (1990–1993); Republican (1993–present)
- Spouse: Edward H. Krebs (m. 1996)

Patricia Ann Carone Krebs (née Carone; born March 21, 1943) is an American high school teacher who became a member of the Pennsylvania House of Representatives during the 1990s.

== Formative years and family ==
Born in Greenville, Pennsylvania on March 21, 1943, Patricia Ann Carone graduated from Greenville High School in 1961. She then attended Thiel College, earned her Bachelor of Science degree from George Washington University in 1967 and her Master of Arts in history from Georgetown University in 1974.

She married fellow Pennsylvania House member Edward H. Krebs on November 1, 1996.

== Public service career ==
Carone served as an aide in the United States Congress, and was then employed as a high school-level educator who taught government studies for twenty-one years. As an educator with the Seneca Valley School District in 1989, Carone researched and produced a video documentary about the community histories of Lancaster and Middle Lancaster for oral history instruction in the Commonwealth of Pennsylvania. It was one of four projects recognized that year with an Innovative Teaching Award by the Pennsylvania State Education Association.

Elected as a delegate to the Democratic National Convention in 1988, she was employed as chair of the social studies department at Seneca Valley High School in February 1990 when she announced her intention to secure her party's nomination to represent the 12th legislative district in the Pennsylvania House of Representatives. She was elected to the Pennsylvania House in 1990 as a Democrat, and was then reelected as a Democrat in 1992.

In 1991, she proposed two bills that would have restricted the ability of power companies to place new, high-voltage power lines near homes and business due to the potential health impacts from electromagnetic field emissions.

Following her reelection in November 1992, Carone joined forces with her future husband, Rep. Edward H. Krebs, a fellow Democrat and freshman member of the Pennsylvania House, in publicly criticizing the intense campaigning by incumbent Speaker of the House Bob O'Donnell and House Majority Leader Bill DeWeese to be appointed as the next leader of the Pennsylvania House of Representatives. Calling it "very disillusioning to return from a tough campaign to face a new kind of campaigning," Carone added:

"I've been sitting on the House floor watching so much energy expended trying to win votes for either side that I feel badly that the legislative issues that need to be addressed are not getting full attention.... This has been wrong for the commonwealth. It should never have happened."

Krebs observed that bills weren't "getting the attention and pressure needed to get a resolution," and said, "If we don't get a resolution, it would be a serious mistake."

Both Carone and Krebs then switched political parties in December 1992, citing their dissatisfaction with Democratic Party leaders. In response, DeWeese "said the only date more appropriate than Pearl Harbor Day for her defection would have been Benedict Arnold's birthday," while Carone "ripped the Democratic Party for being anti-business and pro-spending," according to Allentown's Morning Call newspaper.

Carone was reelected to the Pennsylvania House as a Republican in 1994 and 1996.

Carone and Krebs were married on November 1, 1996, during a ceremony that area newspapers referred to as "the first time in the history of the Commonwealth that two legislators married each other." Throughout the remainder of her legislative career, Carone continued to use the surname under which she was first elected.

She was not a candidate for reelection to the House in 1998.

Following her departure from the Pennsylvania House, she began using the professional name, Patricia Carone Krebs. In February 1999, she was actively involved as a volunteer with Pennsylvania's chapter of the citizen activist group, Common Cause.

She was subsequently hired as the executive director of the Pennsylvania Commission for Community Colleges.
