= Edward H. Krebs =

American politician

Member of the Pennsylvania House of Representatives from the 101st district
- In office January 1, 1991 – November 30, 2002
- Preceded by: George W. Jackson
- Succeeded by: Mauree Gingrich

Personal details
- Born: January 13, 1944 (age 82) Lebanon, Pennsylvania
- Party: Democrat (1990–1993); Republican (1993–present)
- Spouse: Patricia Carone (m. 1996)
- Education: Pennsylvania State University; University of Massachusetts Amherst; Michigan State University
- Occupation: Economist-Farmer

Edward H. Krebs (born January 13, 1944) is a former Republican member of the Pennsylvania House of Representatives.

== Biography ==
Krebs is a 1961 graduate of Annville-Cleona High School. He earned a degree from Pennsylvania State University in 1965, an M.S. from University of Massachusetts Amherst in 1967, and a Ph.D. from Michigan State University in 1970.

During the 1970s and 1980s, he served as a professor of economics at Lebanon Valley College in Annville.

He was first elected as a Democrat to represent the Lebanon-based101st legislative district in 1990 and joined the Republican party in December 1993. He became known for his expertise in education.

To date, he is the last Democrat to represent a significant portion of traditionally heavily Republican Lebanon County at the state level.

In 2002, the political website PoliticsPA named him to the list of "Smartest Legislators," noting that "His moderate, common sense approach to solving problems will be missed in the House." He retired prior to the 2002 election.

In 2021, Krebs announced he would launch a campaign as an independent for the special election in the 48th senatorial district after the death of Dave Arnold. Krebs came in last of the four candidates on the ballot.
