= Joan Orie Melvin =

American judge

Justice of the Pennsylvania Supreme Court
- In office January 4, 2010 – May 1, 2013
- Preceded by: Jane Cutler Greenspan
- Succeeded by: Correale Stevens

Judge of the Superior Court of Pennsylvania
- In office January 4, 1998 – January 4, 2010
- Succeeded by: Robert A. Freedberg

Personal details
- Born: April 6, 1956 (age 70) Pittsburgh, Pennsylvania, U.S.
- Party: Republican
- Education: University of Notre Dame (BA); Duquesne University (JD)

Joan Orie Melvin (born April 6, 1956) is a former justice of the Pennsylvania Supreme Court. In 2013, Melvin was convicted of several criminal counts related to her use of legislative and judicial staff to perform campaign work. She is a member of the Republican Party.

== Education ==
Melvin graduated from the University of Notre Dame in 1978 with a B.A. in economics and earned her J.D. from Duquesne University School of Law in 1981.

== Legal career ==
From 1981 to 1985, Melvin served as a corporate counsel and was engaged in a private law practice, concentrating in civil litigation. She was appointed to the Pittsburgh Municipal Court as Magistrate Judge in 1985 and Chief Magistrate Judge in 1987. She was judge of the Court of Common Pleas of Allegheny County, being appointed to fill a vacancy in 1990 and then getting elected to a full term in 1991. She served in the court's civil, criminal and family divisions. She was elected as a judge of the Superior Court of Pennsylvania in 1997 and won retention in 2007. She ran twice for justice of the Pennsylvania Supreme Court as a Republican, but lost to Max Baer in 2003. In 2009, she was elected to a 10-year term.

== Suit against "Grant Street 99" ==
Melvin was the plaintiff in the case of Melvin v. Doe (575 Pa. 264), in which she sued to uncover the identity of the anonymous blogger "Grant Street 99", who posted allegations that Melvin had engaged in misconduct by lobbying then-Governor Tom Ridge to appoint an attorney for a judicial seat. The case was appealed to the Pennsylvania Supreme Court, which ruled in 2003 that anonymous political speech is protected by the First Amendment. In 2004, Melvin dropped her lawsuit.

== Arrest and conviction ==
On April 7, 2010, two of Melvin's sisters, Pennsylvania state senator Jane Orie and Janine Orie, were arrested and charged with theft of services and criminal conspiracy following a Pittsburgh grand jury investigation. They were accused of using Jane Orie's senate staff and office resources to help run their sister's 2009 campaign for the state supreme court.

On May 17, 2012, the Pittsburgh Post-Gazette reported that Melvin was expected to be charged the next day as a result of the investigation. On May 18, 2012, Melvin was indicted on nine criminal counts alleging she used legislative and judicial staff to perform campaign work. She was immediately suspended by the court.

On February 21, 2013, Melvin was found guilty on three counts of felony-classed theft of services, one count of conspiracy to commit theft of services, also classified as felony, and one count each of misdemeanor misapplication of government property and conspiracy to tamper with evidence.

She resigned from the Supreme Court, effective May 1, 2013.

On May 7, 2013, Melvin was sentenced to 3 years of house arrest followed by 2 years of probation. She was also ordered to perform community service in a soup kitchen 3 days a week, to send a hand-written apology to every judge in the state along with a picture of herself in handcuffs, and to pay for the cost of the photograph.

== Electoral history ==
=== 2003 Election ===
Pennsylvania Justice of the Supreme Court Election 2003
Party	Candidate	Votes	%	±%
Democratic	Max Baer	1,284,846	51.9	
Republican	Joan Orie Melvin	1,192,952	48.1	

=== 2009 Election ===
Pennsylvania Justice of the Supreme Court Election 2009
Party	Candidate	Votes	%	±%
Democratic	Jack Panella	830,277	46.7	
Republican	Joan Orie Melvin	946,121	53.3	
