= Megan Sullivan =

American judge

Judge of the Superior Court of Pennsylvania
- Incumbent
- Assumed office January 3, 2022
- Preceded by: Susan P. Gantman

Personal details
- Born: October 19, 1971 (age 54)
- Party: Republican
- Education: St. Joseph's University; Temple University School of Law
- Occupation: Jurist
- Profession: Attorney

Megan Sullivan is an American lawyer and jurist who currently serves as a judge of the Superior Court of Pennsylvania. A Republican, she was elected to the court in November 2021.
