= Katie Fahey =

American activist (born 1989)

- Born: 4 June 1989 (age 37); Livonia, Michigan, United States
- Education: Aquinas College (Michigan)
- Occupation: Political activist
- Political party: Independent
- Website: thepeople.org

Katie Fahey (born 4 June 1989) is an American activist who led the successful grassroots campaign to ban partisan gerrymandering in Michigan. As the founder of Voters Not Politicians, she organized thousands of volunteers who collected over 425,000 voter signatures for Proposal 2, a ballot initiative amending the state constitution to create an independent redistricting commission. The campaign garnered national attention and brought in millions of dollars in donations. Opponents sued to keep the measure off the ballot, but the Michigan Court of Appeals and the Michigan Supreme Court allowed it, and on November 6, 2018, the state electorate approved Proposal 2 by 61%. Fahey now serves as Executive Director of The People, a national nonpartisan reform organization.

== Education and early career ==
Fahey earned degrees in Sustainable Business and Community Leadership from Aquinas College in 2011. After college she worked for SpartanNash, creating a successful sustainability program for the grocery chain. She then went to work for the Michigan Recycling Coalition as a program coordinator.

== Voters Not Politicians ==
Fahey, an independent, became concerned about the country's increasing political polarization during the 2016 election season. Gerrymandering was an issue she believed most people could agree on regardless of their political party. Shortly after the November election, she posted a message on Facebook: "I'd like to take on gerrymandering in Michigan. If you're interested in doing this as well, please let me know." Dozens of people responded and they formed a citizens group called Voters Not Politicians (VNP).

On March 4, 2017, around 70 people attended the group's first town hall meeting in the Marquette, Michigan, public library. In all, VNP held 33 such meetings in as many days, asking people across the state how they thought a fair redistricting system should work. Volunteers also studied other states' systems and sought advice from election law experts. They wrote a proposal for a ballot initiative which would create a 13-member redistricting commission consisting of four Republicans, four Democrats, and five voters with no party affiliation, all to be selected through a random drawing of registered voters, supervised by the Michigan Secretary of State. The proposal barred anyone from serving on the commission who had held a politically affiliated position within the past six years, including elected officials, candidates, lobbyists, and political consultants.

The ballot initiative, known as the Independent Redistricting Commission Initiative, or simply Proposal 2, was approved by the Board of State Canvassers in August 2017. VNP then had 180 days to collect the over 315,000 signatures required to get the proposal on the November 2018 ballot. With no physical home office and almost no funds, Fahey organized an estimated 4,000 volunteers who collected over 425,000 signatures from all 83 Michigan counties, and turned them in two months before the deadline.

Opponents funded by the Michigan Chamber of Commerce sued twice to have the measure kept off the ballot, arguing that it was too expansive to be considered an amendment to the state constitution and that a state constitutional convention was required. The Michigan Court of Appeals ruled in favor of VNP in June 2018, and in July, the Michigan Supreme Court ruled 4-3 in VNP's favor. By that time, VNP volunteers had already knocked on tens of thousands of doors, talking to voters about Proposal 2. They often crowdsourced on social media to solve problems on the fly. For example, a local business owner who contacted the group through Facebook mass-produced thousands of inexpensive clipboards for the canvassers to use.

The campaign garnered attention from political figures such as former President Barack Obama and former California governor Arnold Schwarzenegger and, as Election Day drew near, took in millions of dollars in donations. On November 6, 2018, Michigan voters approved Proposal 2 by 61% to 39%. At the election night party in Detroit, Fahey said, "The thing we proved tonight is that we are our own saviors. We the people can save ourselves."

Slay the Dragon, a documentary about Fahey and VNP produced by Participant Media, premiered at the Tribeca Film Festival in New York on April 27, 2019.

== National activism ==
In March 2019, Fahey left VNP to serve as executive director of The People, a national nonprofit that supports nonpartisan democratic reforms such as open primaries and ranked-choice voting.
