= Judiciary of Pennsylvania =

The Unified Judicial System of Pennsylvania is the unified state court system of the Commonwealth of Pennsylvania, United States.

== Courts ==
The Supreme Court of Pennsylvania is the state supreme court and court of last resort. The intermediate appellate courts in Pennsylvania are the Commonwealth Court of Pennsylvania (for matters involving state agencies) and the Superior Court of Pennsylvania (for all other appeals).

=== Supreme Court ===
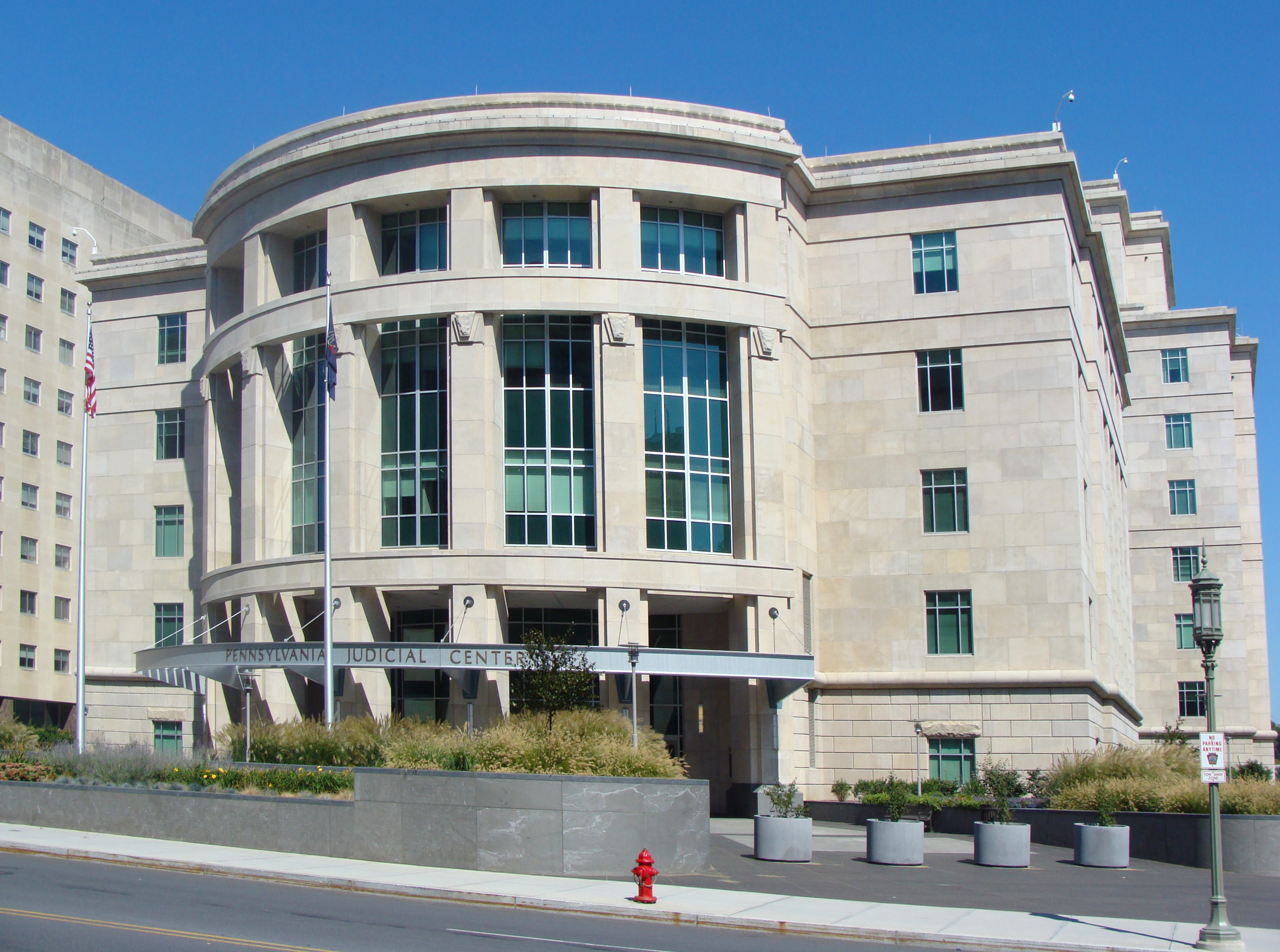
The Pennsylvania Judicial Center within the Pennsylvania State Capitol Complex.

The Supreme Court of Pennsylvania is the state supreme court and court of last resort. The Pennsylvania Supreme Court consists of seven justices.

=== Superior Court ===
The Superior Court of Pennsylvania is one of two Pennsylvania intermediate appellate courts. Appeal to the Superior Court is generally of right from final decisions of the courts of common pleas. Although different panels of three judges may sit to hear appeals, there is only one Superior Court (that is, Pennsylvania is not divided into appellate territories). The court is based in Harrisburg, Pennsylvania and sits to hear cases in Harrisburg, Pittsburgh, and Philadelphia.

=== Commonwealth Court ===
The Commonwealth Court of Pennsylvania is one of two Pennsylvania intermediate appellate courts. The jurisdiction of the nine-judge Commonwealth Court is limited to appeals from final orders of certain state agencies and certain designated cases from the courts of common pleas involving public sector legal questions and government regulation. The Commonwealth Court also functions as a trial court in some civil actions by or against the Commonwealth government and cases regarding statewide elections.

=== Courts of common pleas ===
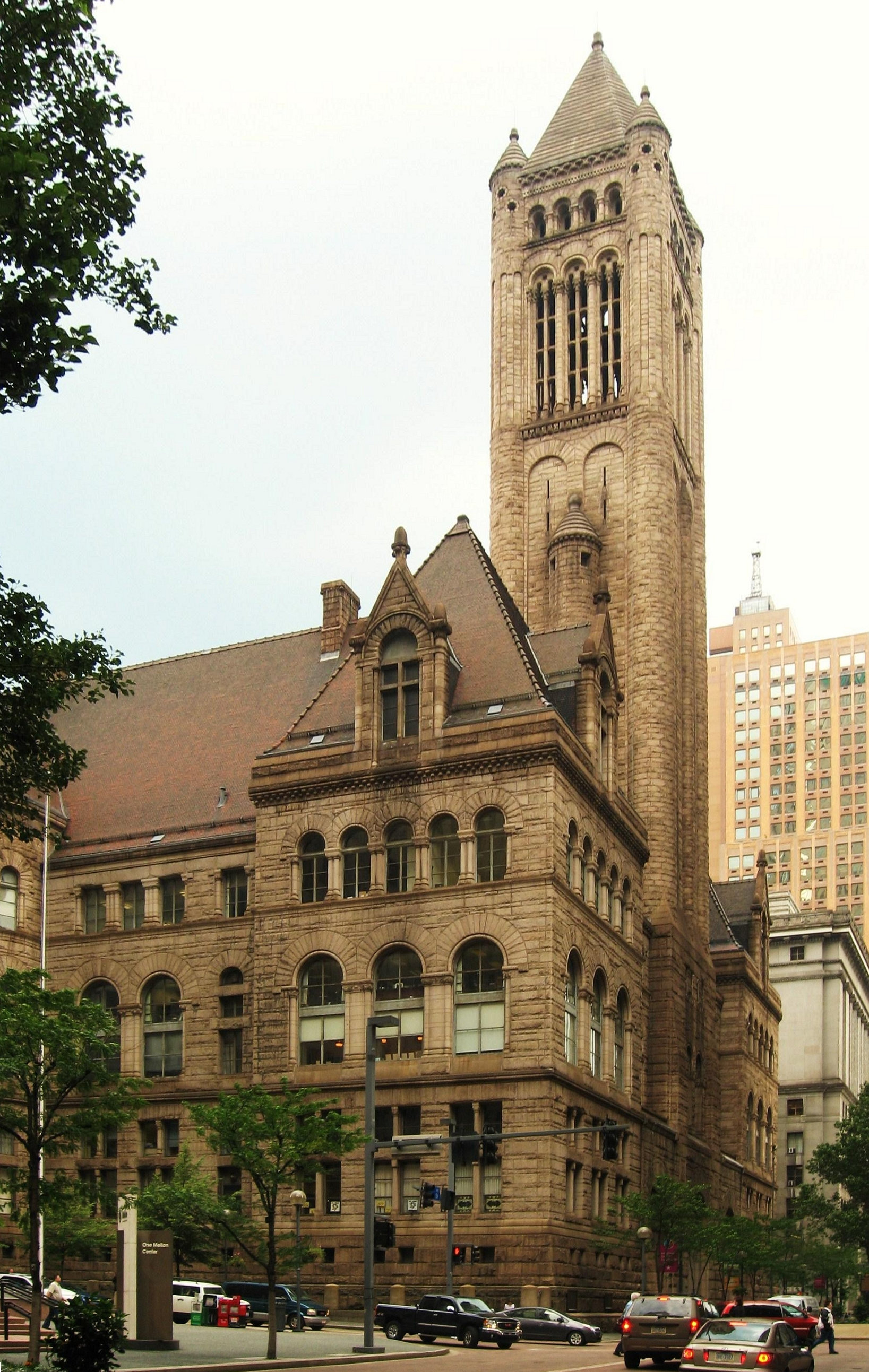
The Allegheny County Courthouse of Allegheny County in Downtown Pittsburgh.

The Pennsylvania courts of common pleas are the state trial courts of general jurisdiction. There are 60 judicial districts, 53 of which comprise only one of Pennsylvania's 67 counties, and seven comprising two counties. Each district has from one to 93 judges.

The courts of common pleas hear civil cases with an amount in controversy in excess of $7,000 and trials for serious crimes. They have original jurisdiction over all cases not exclusively assigned to another court and appellate jurisdiction over judgments from the minor courts. They also hear appeals from certain state government and most local government agencies.

The courts of common pleas also hear matters involving family law (cases involving adoption, divorce, child custody, abuse and neglect, and guardianships), juvenile delinquency, trusts and estates (such as probate), and charitable organizations.

The First Judicial District, in Philadelphia, has a specialized business court docket, the Commerce Case Management Program, first established in 1999 by administrative order of Judge John W. Herron, as does the Fifth Judicial District in Allegheny County (Pittsburgh), the Commerce and Complex Litigation Center, originally led by Judges R. Stanton Wettick Jr. and Christine Ward. Pennsylvania statutory law also encourages the creation of commerce court programs in other judicial districts, as well as on the intermediate appellate level.

=== Magisterial district courts ===
The commonwealth consists of 67 counties. In every county except for Philadelphia County, there are magisterial district courts. These courts are inferior courts of limited jurisdiction. They handle landlord-tenant matters, small civil claims (cases involving amount in controversy up to $12,000), summary offenses, violations of municipal ordinances, and preliminary hearings and arraignments in greater misdemeanor and felony offenses pursuant to Pennsylvania's Rules of Criminal Procedure which go on to be tried in the courts of common pleas. In some counties, such as Chester County, magisterial district courts may issue emergency protection from abuse orders when the Family Court Administration offices of the courts of common pleas are closed.

Magisterial district courts divide up their jurisdiction by geographical location. Most such districts include several municipalities. Larger cities and municipalities may be divided.

Magisterial district judges do not have to be lawyers; however, those who are not lawyers are required to complete a certification course prior to serving. The magisterial district courts are supervised by the president judge of the court of common pleas of that judicial district.

=== Pittsburgh Municipal Court ===
The Pittsburgh Municipal Court is an administrative judicial unit with the 5th Judicial District staffed by Allegheny County magisterial district judges, and has been assigned all matters within the jurisdiction of the Pittsburgh Magistrates Court, which has been established by statute.

=== Philadelphia Municipal Court ===
Philadelphia County has Philadelphia Municipal Court instead of magisterial district courts. These courts hear similar matters to the magisterial district courts, but the jurisdictional limit is $12,000. The Philadelphia Municipal Court has jurisdiction over all traffic offenses, misdemeanors, and preliminary hearings for felonies.

== Administration ==
The Supreme Court justice with the longest continuous service on the court automatically becomes Chief Justice.

A president judge and a court administrator serve in each of the 60 judicial districts. In districts with seven or fewer judges, the president judge with the longest continuous service holds this position. In districts with eight or more judges, the president judge is elected to a five-year term by the court.

The official reporter for the Pennsylvania Supreme Court is the Pennsylvania State Reports since 1845. There are no official reporters for either the Superior Court or the Commonwealth Court, but the Pennsylvania Reporter (a Pennsylvania-specific version of the Atlantic Reporter) is an unofficial reporter. There is no official reporting of decisions of trial courts, but county court (courts of common pleas) opinions are selectively published in the Pennsylvania District and County Reports. Many counties also publish their own reporters which contain select trial court opinions for that county. Estate and trusts trial cases are published in the Fiduciary Reporter, and local government cases (both trial and appellate) are published in Chrostwaite's Pennsylvania Municipal Law Reporter. The Administrative Office of Pennsylvania Courts also posts opinions from the Supreme Court (from November 1996), Superior Court (from December 1997), and Commonwealth Court (from January 1997) on its website. Superior Court opinions were published in the Pennsylvania Superior Court Reports from 1895 to 1997, and Commonwealth Court opinions were published in the Pennsylvania Commonwealth Court Reports from 1970 to 1995.

== Officers ==
=== Judges ===
The Pennsylvania Supreme Court justices are elected to ten year terms. Supreme Court judicial candidates may run on party tickets. After the ten-year term expires, a statewide YES/NO vote for retention is conducted. Judges retained by the voters serve another ten-year term. If the judge is not retained, the Governor—subject to the approval of the State Senate—appoints a temporary replacement until a special election can be held.

Judicial candidates may now express political viewpoints as long as they do not "commit or appear to commit the candidate with respect to cases, controversies or issues that are likely to come before the court."

Justices and all other judges must step down from the bench at the end of the year in which they turn 75, although they may continue to serve part-time as "senior justices" on panels of the Commonwealth's lower appellate courts until they reach 78, the age of mandatory retirement.

Judges of the courts of common pleas are elected to 10-year terms. Philadelphia Municipal Court judges must be lawyers. Judges of the Courts of Common Pleas may serve as part-time senior judges upon retirement. The compensation of senior judges is $545 per day.

As of January 1, 2024, judicial annual salaries are: Justice of the Supreme Court, $253,361; Chief Justice of the Supreme Court, $260,734; Judge of the Commonwealth Court, $239,059; President Judge of the Commonwealth Court, $246,428; Judge of the Court of Common Pleas, $219,933; President Judge and/or Administrative Judge of the Court of Common Pleas, varying based on where the court is located, ranges from $220,892 to $223,618; Judge of the Superior Court, $239,059; President Judge of the Superior Court, $246,428; Magisterial District Judge, $109,973; Judge of the Philadelphia Municipal Court, $214,844; President Judge of the Philadelphia Municipal Court, $218,163; and Senior Judges, $683 per day.

== Law ==
=== Procedure ===
At a preliminary hearing in criminal matters, the Commonwealth must prove a prima facie case against the accused, in which the Commonwealth argues that (1) a crime was probably committed and (2) the accused probably committed the crime. Should the Commonwealth meet its burden, the magisterial district judge orders the case held for trial in the court of common pleas; otherwise, the case is dismissed at the District Court level. The accused also has the option to waive his or her right to a preliminary hearing.

All persons have an unlimited right of appeal from the minor courts (magisterial district courts and Philadelphia Municipal Court) to the courts of common pleas. This is not an appeal in a traditional sense (meaning a party contests the legality of a specific action or entry of evidence), rather the party formally seeks a trial de novo (new trial). In this scheme the findings of the lower court are vacated in the entirety and a new trial is held by a Court of Common Pleas.

== Pittsburgh courts ==
By orders dated November 29, 2004 and February 25, 2005, the Pennsylvania Supreme Court created an administrative judicial unit with the 5th Judicial District referred to as the Pittsburgh Municipal Court and assigned all matters within the jurisdiction of the Pittsburgh Magistrates Court to it. As a result of these orders, the Pittsburgh Magistrates Court is no longer staffed while the Pittsburgh Municipal Court is staffed by Allegheny County magisterial district judges assigned on a rotating basis. The Pittsburgh Magistrates Court, which is created by statute, has not been disestablished by the statute.

== See also ==
- Government of Pennsylvania
- Judicial elections in Pennsylvania
- Law enforcement in Pennsylvania
- List of state and county courthouses in Pennsylvania
- trial de novo
