= H. Francis Kennedy =

American politician (1918–1995

Member of the Pennsylvania House of Representatives from the 12th district
- In office 1969–1974
- Preceded by: District created
- Succeeded by: James A. Green

Member of the Pennsylvania House of Representatives from the Butler County district
- In office 1963–1968

Personal details
- Born: July 7, 1918 Adams Township, Pennsylvania, US
- Died: April 29, 1995 (aged 76) Butler, Pennsylvania, US
- Party: Republican
- Spouse: Martha Everett Kennedy

H. Francis Kennedy (July 7, 1918 – April 29, 1995) was a former Republican member of the Pennsylvania House of Representatives.

Appointed on the Legislative Budget and Finance Committee (1969–1970) and Pennsylvania Commission on Interstate Cooperation (1971–1974), he lost reelection in the 1974 election.
