= REDMAP =

U.S. Republican gerrymandering plan

REDMAP (short for Redistricting Majority Project) is a project of the Republican State Leadership Committee of the United States to increase Republican control of congressional seats, as well as state legislatures, largely through manipulating electoral district boundaries. The project has made effective use of partisan gerrymandering by relying on mapping software, such as Caliper Corporation's Maptitude to improve the precision with which district lines are strategically drawn. The strategy was focused on swing states like Pennsylvania, Ohio, Michigan, North Carolina, and Wisconsin, where there was a Democratic majority, but which they could swing towards Republican with appropriate redistricting. The project was launched in 2010 and estimated to have cost the Republican party around US$30 million.

== Before REDMAP ==
The minority vote protections in the Voting Rights Act resulted in a situation where the party that elected minorities also had an advantage in the House of Representatives. Democrats championed the process, redrawing districts to maintain minority populations. Due in part to this, Democrats largely controlled Congress for 40 years, from 1955 to 1995. Democrats are increasingly winning the majority of the votes in densely populated but small geographic, mostly urban, areas. These urban districts are very hard to gerrymander. This is because most local governments want House districts that respect local boundaries and that local politicians can defend in the polls, while Democratic city governments can influence Democratic state legislators who might otherwise be tempted to gerrymander.

GOP drawn boundaries have been seen to overcrowd districts created by Democrats with disproportionate amounts of minority populations. By increasing numbers in a safe Democratic district, Republicans reduce the influence of the liberal voting bloc in both state politics and congressional elections. Republicans controlled the US House from 1995 until 2007.

However, the Republican party regained its power in state legislatures following the losses by the Democrats in the 2010 mid-terms. The Democrats were unpopular with voters at this time, allowing Republicans to implement a political effort called REDMAP that enabled them to redraw favorable maps with the 2010 Census data.

== Effects ==
REDMAP targeted 107 local state legislative races in 16 states, including swing states like Wisconsin, Michigan, Ohio, Pennsylvania, and Florida. With the intention of flipping Democratic-majority state legislatures and Democrat-held state governorships for the express purpose of controlling redistricting, REDMAP funded negative ads in lower-profile state legislative races. This helped to give Republicans control of 10 of the 15 states that would be redrawing their districts in 2010. They then used sophisticated software such as Maptitude for Redistricting, the software used by most entities, independent commissions, and political parties involved in redistricting, to devise districts favorable to the Republican party, for example by clustering Democratic voters into a handful of districts and ensuring the rest were drawn to include Republican majorities.

The effects of REDMAP first came about in the 2012 United States House of Representatives elections, in which Republicans were able to secure several districts and retain control of the United States House of Representatives by a 33-seat margin despite Democratic candidates collectively receiving over 1 million more votes than Republican candidates. However, in the 2018 US midterm elections, though the GOP won a majority of Senate seats, it lost the House by a portion roughly equal to the popular vote.

The redistricting of Wisconsin became the basis of a case before the Supreme Court of the United States, Gill v. Whitford, brought to challenge if the redistricting of that state was considered unconstitutional partisan gerrymandering. The Court unanimously ruled that the plaintiffs lacked standing in the evidence they brought to the Court, and it remanded the case to the District Court so that they could present evidence in favor of their standing. As such, the Supreme Court did not rule on the merits of the case.

== Criticism ==
REDMAP has been criticized for its efforts to gerrymander districts. Critics have noted that the Republican Party won a 33-seat majority in the House of Representatives in 2012 despite its candidates collectively receiving 1.4 million fewer votes than Democratic candidates.

REDMAP has also been criticized for targeting people of color, particularly African Americans. David Daley, author of the 2016 book Ratf**ked: Why Your Vote Doesn't Count, stated that the effects of REDMAP constituted a "wholesale political resegregation along both sides of the Mason–Dixon line" and that redistricting by Republican legislatures redrew maps to "pack as many Black and Democratic voters into as few districts as possible". Reverend William J. Barber II, co-chair of the Poor People's Campaign, has likewise asserted that Republicans "cracked, stacked, packed, and bleached Black voters".

In response to this, Black political leaders made deals with Republicans in states like Missouri, North Carolina, and Georgia to preserve Black representation in Congress while giving Republicans more safe seats.

== See also ==
- Gerrymandering in the United States
