= Bridge Michigan =

Nonprofit, nonpartisan news organization in Michigan

- Website type: News
- Available in: English
- Owner: Center for Michigan
- Founders: Philip Power, Kathy Power
- CEO: John Bebow
- Website: bridgemi.com
- Commercial: No
- Launched: September 2011; 15 years ago
- Current status: Online

Bridge Michigan is a Michigan-based nonprofit, nonpartisan news organization founded in 2011 that focuses on public policy. It is headquartered in Ypsilanti, Michigan, and has offices in Detroit and Lansing.

== History ==
The Center for Michigan, founded by Philip and Kathy Power and a bipartisan steering committee, hired John Bebow as an investigative reporter in 2006. For the 2010 Michigan gubernatorial election, the center created the Michigan Truth Squad and a year later, launched Bridge Magazine based on the existing Truth Squad. By 2018, ProPublica began to partner with Bridge Michigan. For the 2018 Michigan gubernatorial election, Bridge Michigan organized a Truth Squad to monitor the comments made by candidates at the time. During the COVID-19 pandemic in Michigan, Bridge Michigan partnered with Detroit Free Press and Chalkbeat to track $6 billion of federal funding for education in Michigan.

== Reception ==
The Blade described Bridge Michigan as "a well-regarded online publication that covers state issues". In 2017, Bridge Michigan and reporter Chastity Pratt Dawsey were awarded during The Matrix Awards the "Vanguard Award" for Poison on Tap, that the Michigan Chronicle described as "the first comprehensive book about the Flint water crisis".

In 2015, 2016, 2017 and 2018, Bridge Michigan won multiple awards, including the "Weekly/News Media Publication Class A Newspaper of the Year" as part of the Michigan Press Associations Better Newspaper awards. For the 2018 MPA Better Newspaper, Bridge Michigan also won "The Best FOIA Story Award" for a report on how the Governor Rick Snyder's officials worked beside Enbridge lobbyists and employees to promote Enbridge Line 5 after reviewing emails revealed upon a Freedom of Information Act request. In the 2021 MPA Better Newspaper Contest, Bridge Michigan won "The Best FOIA Story Award" for its reporting that law enforcement officials, specifically Barry County Sheriff Dar Leaf, attempted to assist Donald Trump with his attempts to overturn the 2020 United States presidential election.

== See also ==
- Detroit Free Press
- Institute for Nonprofit News (member)
- List of newspapers in Michigan
- MLive
