= Free elections law =

States in blue have amendments which contain mandates for free, equal and/or open elections and prohibiting interferences with the right to free suffrage. States in green-brown have amendments which contain exceptions to this right for those convicted of felonies. Alabama, in green, does not explicitly contain the word "free", but does prohibit "all undue influences from power, bribery, tumult, or other improper conduct".

A free elections law, also known as a free and equal elections clause, is a section in many U.S. state constitutions which mandates that elections of public officials shall be free and not influenced by other powers. Most such laws were placed into state constitutions in the late 18th and early 19th century. 31 states maintain some of constitutional protection for free elections.

== Background ==
The text "and equal" was added by James Wilson to the text providing for free elections in the Constitution of Pennsylvania in 1790. It was subsequently adopted by several state constitutions.

An earlier provision in the 1776 Constitutions of North Carolina and Virginia referred only to the right to free elections for state legislators. The reference to state representatives were later removed in both states.

A provision stating that "No officer whatever shall serve any process, or give any other hinderances to any person entitled to vote, either in going to the place of election' or during the time of the said election, or on their returning home from such election; nor shall any military officer, or soldier, appear at any election in a military character, to the intent that all elections may be free and open" appeared in the 1777 Georgia constitution, but was removed entirely in 1789.

== Free elections laws ==
State	Text	Section	First introduced	Still in force?	Notes
Alabama	"The privilege of suffrage shall be protected by laws regulating elections, and prohibiting, under adequate penalties, all undue influences from power, bribery, tumult, or other improper conduct."	Ala. Article I, § 3.	1819 (since modified)	Yes	The original free elections law codified "the privilege of free suffrage" in 1819, but the word "free" was removed in the 1865 Constitution onward.
Arizona	“All elections shall be free and equal, and no power, civil or military, shall at any time interfere to prevent the free exercise of the right of suffrage.”	Ariz. Const. art. II, § 21	1910	Yes	
Arkansas	“Elections shall be free and equal. No power, civil or military, shall ever interfere to prevent the free exercise of the right of suffrage; nor shall any law be enacted whereby such right shall be impaired or forfeited, except for the commission of a felony, upon lawful conviction thereof.”	Ark. Const. art. 3, § 2	1836	Yes	Kept in force in the current Constitution of 1874
California	“The Legislature shall define residence and provide for registration and free elections.”	Cali. Const. art. II, §3	1849 (since modified)	Yes	The 1849 Constitution's free elections law protected "the privilege of free suffrage" from "all undue influences". This was amended in the 1879 version.
Colorado	“All elections shall be free and open; and no power, civil or military, shall at any time interfere to prevent the free exercise of the right of suffrage.”	Colo. Const. art. II, § 5	1876	Yes	
Connecticut	“Laws shall be made to support the privilege of free suffrage, prescribing the manner of regulating and conducting meetings of the electors, and prohibiting, under adequate penalties, all undue influence therein, from power, bribery, tumult and other improper conduct.”	Conn. Const. art. VI, §4	1818	Yes	
Delaware	“All elections shall be free and equal.”	Del. Const. art. I, § 3	1792	Yes	The 1776 state constitution made explicit reference to preventing military or violent force from interference in elections during specific election periods.
Idaho	“No power, civil or military, shall at any time interfere with or prevent the free and lawful exercise of the right of suffrage.”	Idaho Const. art. I, § 19	1890	Yes	
Illinois	“All elections shall be free and equal.”	Ill. Const. art. III, § 3		Yes	
Indiana	“All elections shall be free and equal.”	Ind. Const. art. 2, § 1	1851	Yes	
Kentucky	“All elections shall be free and equal.”	Ky. Const. § 6		Yes	
Maryland	“That the right of the People to participate in the Legislature is the best security of liberty and the foundation of all free Government; for this purpose, elections ought to be free and frequent; and every citizen having the qualifications prescribed by the Constitution, ought to have the right of suffrage.”	Md. Dec. of R. art. 7	1776	Yes	
Massachusetts	“All elections ought to be free; and all the inhabitants of this commonwealth, having such qualifications as they shall establish by their frame of government, have an equal right to elect officers, and to be elected, for public employments.”	Mass. Const. pt. 1, art. IX	1780	Yes	
Missouri	“That all elections shall be free and open; and no power, civil or military, shall at any time interfere to prevent the free exercise of the right of suffrage.”	Mo. Const. art. I, § 25		Yes	
Montana	“All elections shall be free and open, and no power, civil or military, shall at any time interfere to prevent the free exercise of the right of suffrage.”	Mont. Const. art. II, § 13		Yes	
Nebraska	“All elections shall be free; and there shall be no hindrance or impediment to the right of a qualified voter to exercise the elective franchise.”	Ne. Const. art. I, § 22		Yes	
New Hampshire	“All elections are to be free, and every inhabitant of the state of 18 years of age and upwards shall have an equal right to vote in any election.”	N.H. Const. pt. 1st, art. 11	1784	Yes	
New Mexico	“All elections shall be free and open, and no power, civil or military, shall at any time interfere to prevent the free exercise of the right of suffrage.”	N.M. Const. art. II, § 8	1910	Yes	
North Carolina	“All elections shall be free.”	N.C. Const. art. I, § 10	1776, amended 1868	Yes	Originally written specific to "of members, to serve as Representatives in General Assembly"; clause was shortened by the Reconstruction Convention of 1868.
Oklahoma	“All elections shall be free and equal. No power, civil or military, shall ever interfere to prevent the free exercise of the right of suffrage, and electors shall, in all cases, except for treason, felony, and breach of the peace, be privileged from arrest during their attendance on elections and while going to and from the same.”	Okl. Const. art. III, § 5	1907	Yes	
Oregon	“All elections shall be free and equal.”	Ore. Const. art. II, § 1	1857	Yes	
Pennsylvania	“Elections shall be free and equal; and no power, civil or military, shall at any time interfere to prevent the free exercise of the right of suffrage.”	Pa. Const. art. I, § 5	1790	Yes	
South Carolina	“All elections shall be free and open, and every inhabitant of this State possessing the qualifications provided for in this Constitution shall have an equal right to elect officers and be elected to fill public office.”	S.C. Const. art. I, § 5	1868	Yes	
South Dakota	“Elections shall be free and equal, and no power, civil or military, shall at any time interfere to prevent the free exercise of the right of suffrage.”	S.D. Const. art. VII, § 1		Yes	
Tennessee	“The elections shall be free and equal, and the right of suffrage, as hereinafter declared, shall never be denied to any person entitled thereto, except upon conviction by a jury of some infamous crime, previously ascertained and declared by law, and judgment thereon by court of competent jurisdiction.”	Tenn. Const. art. I, § 5		Yes	
Texas	“The privilege of free suffrage shall be protected by laws regulating elections and prohibiting under adequate penalties all undue influence in elections from power, bribery, tumult, or other improper practice.”	Tex. Const. art. VI, § 2(c)		Yes	
Utah	“All elections shall be free, and no power, civil or military, shall at any time interfere to prevent the free exercise of the right of suffrage.”	Utah Const. art. I, § 17	1895	Yes	
Vermont	“That all elections ought to be free and without corruption, and that all voters, having a sufficient, evident, common interest with, and attachment to the community, have a right to elect officers, and be elected into office, agreeably to the regulations made in this constitution.”	Vt. Const. ch. 1, art. 8	1793	Yes	The text was retained from the constitutions of the Vermont Republic from 1777 and 1786.
Virginia	“That all elections ought to be free; and that all men, having sufficient evidence of permanent common interest with, and attachment to, the community, have the right of suffrage, and cannot be taxed, or deprived of, or damaged in, their property for public uses, without their own consent, or that of their representatives duly elected, or bound by any law to which they have not, in like manner, assented for the public good.”	Va. Const. art. I, § 6	1776	Yes	Originally written specific to "of members to serve as representatives of the people, in assembly". The entire section was removed in 1851, but most of the section was reinstated in 1864 without the reference to the legislative branch.
Washington	“All Elections shall be free and equal, and no power, civil or military, shall at any time interfere to prevent the free exercise of the right of suffrage.”	Wash. Const. art. I, § 19		Yes	
Wyoming	“Elections shall be open, free and equal, and no power, civil or military, shall at any time interfere to prevent an untrammeled exercise of the right of suffrage.”	Wyo. Const. art. I, § 27		Yes	

== Related provisions ==
44 states maintain a constitutional requirement for elections to be conducted by secret ballot, with the exceptions of New Jersey, Rhode Island, Vermont, Delaware, Oklahoma, Oregon, and the District of Columbia. Of these seven jurisdictions, all but New Jersey, Rhode Island and the District of Columbia have a free elections clause in their constitutions.

25 states maintain a constitutional or statutory right to initiative and/or veto referendum processes at the statewide level. Of these, 18 states also maintain a free elections clause in their state constitutions.

In addition, as of 2020, the state constitutions of California, Washington, Montana, Idaho, Arizona, Colorado and Virginia all provide for both free elections mandates and for redistricting commissions to redraw congressional, legislative and additional districts.

== Role in anti-gerrymandering litigation and measures ==
Since the U.S. Supreme Court's 2019 ruling in Rucho v. Common Cause, free elections clauses have been increasingly cited as potential safeguards against gerrymandering.

On February 4, 2022, the North Carolina Supreme Court ruled 4-3 against both congressional and legislative maps drawn by the North Carolina General Assembly's Republican majority on the grounds of the maps violating the state constitution's free elections clause. Following the 2022 North Carolina judicial elections, in which a Republican candidate for Chief Justice flipped the partisan majority on the court, the Supreme Court revisited and overturned the prior ruling, allowing pro-Republican maps to be instated for the 2024 elections.

== See also ==
- Free and fair election
