= Lori Dumas =

American jurist

Judge of the Pennsylvania Commonwealth Court
- Incumbent
- Assumed office January 3, 2022
- Preceded by: Mary Leavitt

Personal details
- Born: December 2, 1967 (age 58) Philadelphia, Pennsylvania, U.S.
- Party: Democratic
- Education: Duke University (BS); North Carolina Central University (JD)

Lori Aretta Dumas (born December 2, 1967) is an American lawyer and jurist. A Democrat, she was elected to the Commonwealth Court of Pennsylvania in November 2021 and assumed office on January 3, 2022. She previously served as a judge of the Philadelphia Court of Common Pleas from January 7, 2002 to January 2, 2022.
