= Jack Panella =

American judge (born 1955)

Jack A. Panella

President Judge of the Superior Court of Pennsylvania
- In office January 3, 2019 – January 6, 2024
- Preceded by: Susan Gantman
- Succeeded by: Anne E. Lazarus

Judge of the Superior Court of Pennsylvania
- Incumbent
- Assumed office January 9, 2004

Judge of the Court of Common Pleas of Northampton County
- In office October 25, 1991 – December 31, 2003

Personal details
- Born: Jack Anthony Panella; May 4, 1955 (age 71) Brooklyn, New York
- Party: Democratic
- Education: St. John's University; Columbus School of Law

Jack Anthony Panella (born May 4, 1955) is an American lawyer and jurist who serves as a judge of the Superior Court of Pennsylvania. He previously served as the President Judge up until January 6, 2024. He is a member of the Democratic Party. Prior to his election to the Superior Court, he was a Judge on the Court of Common Pleas of Northampton County, Pennsylvania.

== Personal ==
Panella attended St. John's University and graduated in 1977 with a B.S. degree in Accounting. He then received his J.D. degree in 1980 from The Catholic University of America Columbus School of Law, where he received the American Jurisprudence award from The Lawyers Co-Operative Publishing Company for the highest academic grade in Contracts.

Following graduation, Panella was a judicial law clerk in the Court of Common Pleas of Northampton County, Pennsylvania. Following his clerkship, from 1982 to 1991, he maintained his law practice as a sole practitioner.

As an assistant county solicitor for Northampton County, he represented the Department of Human Services, including the Children and Youth Services Division, the Mental Health Division, and the Area Agency on Aging. In May 1987, he was the youngest attorney in the history of Northampton County to be selected as the County Solicitor.

In 2002, he was selected to join the United States Army National Guard to visit United States troops in Germany and Bosnia. The trip was a cooperative effort of the 28th Infantry Division with the Employer Support of the Guard and Reserve (ESGR) Committee.

In 2005, Panella received the honor of "Cavaliere" by the Republic of Italy, which is awarded to individuals of Italian descent living abroad who have provided outstanding leadership and service to the positive image of Italy and Italians. On September 27, 2019, Panella received the Outstanding Service Award from the Justinian Society of Philadelphia.

== Judicial career ==
Panella's election to appellate court in 2003 followed twelve years as a trial judge. He was appointed to the Northampton County Bench in 1991 by Governor Robert P. Casey, and became the second youngest judge in the history of Northampton County. In 1993 he was elected to a full ten-year term commencing January 1, 1994. He presided over civil, criminal and family law cases and was also the Administrative Judge for Asbestos Litigation, which involved complex mass tort litigation.

While a trial judge, he was a member of the Pennsylvania Conference of State Trial Judges. He was Chair of the Commonwealth Partners Program, where he participated in statewide meetings with other judges and legislators in discussing and resolving issues of mutual concern. In recognition of the success of this program, Panella received the President's Award from the Conference of State Trial Judges in 2002.

He was elected to the Superior Court of Pennsylvania in November 2003, and was sworn into office as an appellate judge on January 9, 2004. He presides over appeals from civil, criminal and family law cases. He served a five-year term as the statewide Administrative Judge for Wiretap & Electronic Surveillance in Pennsylvania.

He was named runner up for the 2003 Politician of the Year by the political website PoliticsPA.

In 2004, he was appointed by the Supreme Court of Pennsylvania to the Commission for Justice Initiatives in Pennsylvania (CJI), a committee organized to coordinate and recommend judicial outreach and specialized court programs. He was the Chair of the Public Education and Community Outreach subcommittee of the Commission. As part of his responsibilities for the CJI, Panella conceived and wrote a popular short film on the history and operation of the Pennsylvania Judiciary.

On August 26, 1997, Panella was appointed by the Supreme Court of Pennsylvania to be a judge of the Pennsylvania Court of Judicial Discipline (CJD), a constitutional court that hears charges filed by the Judicial Conduct Board against judicial officers. In June 2000, he was elected President Judge by his fellow judges. His four-year term expired in August 2001. In 2005, he was appointed by the Supreme Court of Pennsylvania to the Judicial Conduct Board (JCB), which is the investigatory and prosecutorial arm of the judicial discipline system in Pennsylvania. In July 2007, he was elected Chair of the Judicial Conduct Board, making him the only judge in the history of Pennsylvania to be elected both Chair of the JCB as well as President Judge of the CJD. In 2013, Panella became the only judge to be reappointed by the Pennsylvania Supreme Court to the Court of Judicial Discipline. He served a four year term and was again elected the President Judge in 2017.

== Publications ==
Panella has written three books and authored other publications in the judicial and legal fields. Panella's first book, The Pennsylvania Sexual Violence Benchbook, was published in December 2007. The book is a comprehensive reference designed to help judges for the complex criminal issues surrounding sexual violence cases. The book has received very favorable reviews.

Panella's second book, The Pennsylvania Sexual Violence BenchBook, Magisterial District Court Edition, was published in 2010. This version of the benchbook was designed to assist Magisterial District Court Judges, and addresses the issues facing MDJ's during the earlier proceedings in prosecution for sexual violence. He was one of the authors of The Pennsylvania Restitution Benchbook, published in 2020 by the Administrative Office of Pennsylvania Courts.

In recognition of his work in judicial education regarding crimes of sexual violence, Panella received the NSVRC Visionary Voice Award in 2017 by the National Sexual Violence Resource Center.
