= Max Baer (judge) =

American judge (1947–2022)

Chief Justice of the Pennsylvania Supreme Court
- In office April 1, 2021 – September 30, 2022
- Preceded by: Thomas G. Saylor
- Succeeded by: Debra Todd

Justice of the Pennsylvania Supreme Court
- In office January 5, 2004 – September 30, 2022
- Preceded by: William H. Lamb
- Succeeded by: Daniel McCaffery

Personal details
- Born: David Max Baer; December 24, 1947 Pittsburgh, Pennsylvania, U.S.
- Died: September 30, 2022 (aged 74) Allegheny County, Pennsylvania, U.S.
- Party: Democratic
- Education: University of Pittsburgh (BA); Duquesne University (JD); Robert Morris University (MS)

David Max Baer (December 24, 1947 – September 30, 2022) was an American judge who served as a justice of the Pennsylvania Supreme Court from the time of his election in 2003 until his death in 2022. He was elevated to the court's most senior position, chief justice, in 2021.

Nicknamed the "Fighting Judge" during his quest to be elected to the Allegheny County Court of Common Pleas in 1989, he went on to institute a series of reforms in the court's Family Division that were replicated by courts across the United States. He was subsequently honored for his positive impact on the nation's judicial system by the President of the United States.

In 2003, he was described by editors at The Philadelphia Inquirer as "a jurist with a great thirst for making the state's courts function better for all."

== Formative years ==
Born as David Max Baer in Pittsburgh, Pennsylvania on December 24, 1947, Max Baer was the oldest son of Henry "Budd" Baer, a native of Wheeling, West Virginia, who became a successful auto dealer after relocating to western Pennsylvania, and Helen (Scheimer) Baer, who was a native of Dormont, Pennsylvania, and past president of the University of Pittsburgh Alumni Association.

Raised in Dormont, Baer and his parents and siblings were active with the Beth El Congregation in South Hills.

== Education ==
A graduate of the Linsly Military Institute in Wheeling, West Virginia, Baer earned his Bachelor of Arts from the University of Pittsburgh in 1971. In 1975, he was awarded a Juris Doctor from Duquesne University.

== Legal and civic affairs career ==
From December 1975 to 1979, he served as Deputy Attorney General of Pennsylvania. In 1978, he represented three Pennsylvania State Police troopers who were being sued for illegal arrest by a suspect in a high-profile murder case. The civil case was dismissed by the federal court in May 1978 when "the suit was dropped because the plaintiffs did not want [the suspect] to face cross-examination," according to newspaper interviews conducted with Baer. The suspect was subsequently found not guilty of second-degree murder, rape and robbery.

A resident of Lakemont Drive in Mt. Lebanon, Pennsylvania, and an attorney who had been engaged in private practice law since 1979 as a partner with the law firm of Campbell, Sherrard and Burke, Baer ran as a Democrat for, and was elected to, the position of judge in the Allegheny County Court of Common Pleas in 1989. Assigned to the Family Division of the court upon taking office in January 1990, he issued rulings in adoption, child custody, and juvenile justice cases.

In 1999, he was retained for a second ten-year term with that court.

In 2003, he was elected to the Pennsylvania Supreme Court after narrowly defeating state Superior Court Judge Joan Orie Melvin. In response to a questionnaire submitted to candidates for the post prior to the election, Baer stated:

"I believe the people have a right to know the beliefs of all candidates, including judges. One of the criticisms of judicial elections is that public is not informed. The ability to express beliefs will remedy that. However, the public must understand that a judge is obligated to follow the law regardless of personal beliefs, sometimes rendering a decision inconsistent with those beliefs."

His salary for service on the Pennsylvania Supreme Court was initially $140,000 per year.

In 2009, Baer delivered the keynote address during the centennial celebration of the Luzerne County Courthouse.

Baer was retained in a retention election in 2013 for a second ten-year term. He ascended to chief justice in 2021 upon the retirement of Chief Justice Thomas Saylor.

=== Key Court of Common Pleas actions ===
Among the changes he made to Allegheny Court of Common Pleas, Baer created a program which required parents who were involved in child custody cases to attend parenting classes and engage in mediation sessions that were designed to help the parents avoid becoming entangled in litigation. Baer also garnered recognition for his efforts to streamline Pennsylvania's adoption process and improve the screening and oversight of adoption caseworkers.

=== Key Pennsylvania Supreme Court rulings ===
In 2009, Baer supported the Pennsylvania Supreme Court's majority ruling that outdated property tax assessments of county government agencies which failed to reassess properties within their jurisdictions in a timely manner were unconstitutional because they violated the uniformity clause of the state constitution. Baer advised counties "to begin reassessment, or to stand ready to defend the lawsuit which will inevitably come," and recommended that agencies reassess properties whenever deviation rates in property sale prices exceeded twenty percent.

In 2018, Baer was one of five Democrats on the Pennsylvania Supreme Court to issue a majority ruling which struck down Pennsylvania's 2011 congressional district map ("League of Women Voters, et al. v. the Commonwealth of Pennsylvania, et al."), noting that the "map 'clearly, plainly and palpably' violated the state constitution because it favored the GOP's candidates in 13 of the state's 18 districts." When Pennsylvania's governor and state legislature failed to achieve compromise on a replacement map, the court appointed an advisor to create a new map that was adopted prior to the 2018 mid-term elections.

In 2020, Baer was also one of the Pennsylvania Supreme Court justices to issue a majority ruling which affirmed that ballot drop boxes and satellite election offices are permissible and appropriate under Pennsylvania state law. The ruling also approved the Commonwealth of Pennsylvania's plan to extend the submission deadline for mail-in ballots in response to anticipated mail delivery problems by the United States Postal Service. In his ruling, Baer wrote, "There is nothing constitutionally infirm about a deadline of 8:00 p.m. on Election Day for the receipt of ballots," basing his opinion on the Free and Equal Elections clause of the state constitution, "which requires leaders to keep 'all aspects of the electoral process' as open as possible to allow the largest number of people to vote in a given election," according to news reports of the court's action.

=== Awards and other honors ===
Baer was honored for his public service multiple times, including as recipient of:

- Champion of Children Award
- National Award for judicial innovation, presented by the President of the United States during a White House ceremony
- Pennsylvania Child and Adoption Advocate of the Year
- Steward Award

== Death and tributes ==
Baer died at his home in the South Hills of Pittsburgh. on September 30, 2022, just months before attaining the mandatory retirement age of 75.

Pennsylvania Governor Tom Wolf ordered that all state flags at state buildings and grounds be flown at half-staff in Baer's honor, praising Baer as a "respected and esteemed jurist with decades of service to our courts and our commonwealth."

The Pennsylvania Supreme Court held a public memorial service for Baer on October 4, 2022, at the Charles J. Dougherty ballroom in Duquesne's Power Center. The service was also broadcast live online.

== Elections ==
=== 2003 election ===
Pennsylvania Justice of the Supreme Court Election 2003
Party	Candidate	Votes	%
Democratic	Max Baer	1,284,846	51.9
Republican	Joan Orie Melvin	1,192,952	48.1
Total votes		2,477,798	100.0

== See also ==
- List of Jewish American jurists
- Supreme Court of Pennsylvania

Legal offices
Preceded by Thomas G. Saylor	Chief Justice of the Pennsylvania Supreme Court; 2021–2022	Succeeded by Debra Todd
