= Susan Gantman =

American judge

Honorable Susan Peikes Gantman

President Judge of the Superior Court of Pennsylvania
- In office January 6, 2014 – January 3, 2019
- Preceded by: John T. Bender
- Succeeded by: Jack Panella

Judge of the Superior Court of Pennsylvania
- In office January 4, 2004 – April 1, 2020
- Succeeded by: Megan Sullivan

Personal details
- Born: August 8, 1952 (age 74) Philadelphia, Pennsylvania
- Party: Republican
- Spouse: Lewis Gantman
- Education: Bachelor of Arts and Master of Arts degrees, University of Pennsylvania (cum laude, 1974); Juris Doctor, Villanova University School of Law (1977)

Susan Peikes Gantman (born August 8, 1952) was a senior judge and president judge emeritus of the Pennsylvania Superior Court. She has been described by historians as "a tireless advocate on behalf of children and other victims of abuse."

== Formative years and family ==
A daughter of Thelma Peikes and Dr. Irwin L. Peikes, and the wife of Lewis Gantman, Susan Peikes Gantman was born in Norristown, Pennsylvania. She earned her Bachelor of Arts and Master of Arts degrees as a cum laude graduate of the University of Pennsylvania in 1974 and her Juris Doctor degree from the Villanova University School of Law in 1977.

== Legal career ==
A law clerk of Judge Richard S. Lowe in the Montgomery County Court of Common Pleas from 1977 to 1978, Gantman was employed as the solicitor for both the Montgomery County Office of Children and Youth and the Montgomery County Housing and Community Development from 1978 to 2002, and a Montgomery County assistant district attorney for the major felony-homicide unit from 1978 to 1981.

She then entered private practice as an attorney in 1981 and served in that capacity until 2004, during which time she provided guidance to clients regarding domestic law, juvenile law, Orphans’ Court actions, and appellate issues. In 1991, she became a partner with Sherr, Joffe & Zuckerman, P.C., and chaired the firm's domestic relations department. Hired as a senior member of Cozen O’Connor in 1998, she co-chaired that firm's family law department.

Elected as a Republican to the Pennsylvania Superior Court in 2003 during a close contest that was subsequently contested, she took office on January 5, 2004. Retained in 2013, she served as president judge from 2014 to 2019, and took senior status as in 2020.

On August 28 and 31, 2015, Gantman approved twenty search warrants that were filed by Montgomery County prosecutors during their investigation of Pennsylvania Attorney General Kathleen Kane for perjury, obstruction of justice and related charges. Kane was subsequently convicted.

In 2016, Gantman wrote the opinion of a three-judge panel that overturned a sanction issued by a Common Pleas judge against a medical malpractice attorney.

On April 14, 2022, Gantman was appointed to a four-year term on Pennsylvania's Judicial Conduct Board.

Gantman was also an educator who created and presented multiple training programs for members of the Lawyers Club of Philadelphia, the Montgomery County and Pennsylvania Bar associations, Pennsylvania's Department of Public Welfare, and the Pennsylvania State Police Academy. Her seminars frequently addressed appellate practice and procedure.

== Later years ==
Gantman retired from the bench in 2021. She planned to write civics education books for children.

== Awards and other honors ==
Gantman has received multiple honors during her career, including:

- Anne X. Alpern Award, Pennsylvania Bar Association (2011)
- Bond of Faith, Temple Beth Hillel-Beth El
- Harnwell Award, University of Pennsylvania (1974)
- Honoree, Brandeis Law Society Law Day
- Honoree, Villanova Law Alumni Association (2006)
- Juvenile Advisory Association Award
- Margaret Richardson Award, Montgomery Bar Association (2008)
- Outstanding Service Award, Montgomery County Office of Children and Youth

== Community service and professional affiliations ==
Gantman has been active with multiple civic, non-profit and professional associations throughout her life, including:

- American Bar Association (member)
- Federation of Allied Jewish Appeal (board of directors)
- Montgomery County Bar Association (member of the association and of the association's Taxis Circle)
- National Association of Women Judges (member)
- Pennsylvania Bar Association (member of the association's Commission on Women in the Profession and a fellow of the association's foundation)
- Villanova University School of Law (Inns of Court, Master)
- Women of Vision (board of directors)
- Women's Philanthropy (board of directors)
