= Thomas G. Saylor =

American judge

Chief Justice of the Pennsylvania Supreme Court
- In office January 6, 2015 – April 1, 2021
- Preceded by: Ronald D. Castille
- Succeeded by: Max Baer

Justice of the Pennsylvania Supreme Court
- In office January 5, 1998 – December 31, 2021
- Succeeded by: P. Kevin Brobson

Personal details
- Born: December 14, 1946 (age 79) Meyersdale, Pennsylvania, U.S.
- Party: Republican
- Education: University of Virginia (BA, LLM); Columbia University (JD)

Thomas G. Saylor (born December 14, 1946) is a former chief justice and associate justice of the Supreme Court of Pennsylvania, and a former judge of the Superior Court of Pennsylvania.

A member of the Republican Party, Saylor retired from his supreme court seat in 2021 at the constitutionally mandated judicial retirement age of seventy-five.

== Formative years ==
Born in Meyersdale, Somerset County, Pennsylvania, Saylor lived in Cumberland County for most of his life. He received a Bachelor of Arts from the University of Virginia in 1969, a Juris Doctor from the Columbia University School of Law in 1972, and a Master of Laws from the University of Virginia School of Law in 2004.

== Legal and public service career ==
Saylor worked as a prosecutor in Somerset County from 1972 to 1982, before serving as a Director of the Pennsylvania Bureau of Consumer Protection from 1982 to 1983. He was First Deputy Attorney General for Pennsylvania from 1983 to 1987, and served on the Superior Court of Pennsylvania from 1993 to 1997.

Saylor began service as a justice of the Supreme Court of Pennsylvania on January 1, 1997, and became chief justice in 2015, when Ronald D. Castille left the court on reaching the mandatory retirement age. His initial salary was $209,329.

Saylor retired from the supreme court on December 31, 2021. During his tenure, he authored more than four hundred majority opinions related to civil and criminal legal issues. His court colleagues subsequently granted him the honorary title of chief justice emeritus.

In August 2018, Saylor wrote for the majority when it found that the criminal conviction of a rapper for making a song entitled "Fuck the Police" did not violate the First Amendment to the United States Constitution because, he determined, the song contained true threats.

According to Common Pleas Judge Barry Feudale, Saylor complained to him that African American former Supreme Court Justice Cynthia Baldwin had "caused us a lot of trouble when she was on the Supreme Court because of her minority agenda.” In a 2019 affidavit, Feudale, who presided over the grand jury that indicted Jerry Sandusky during the Penn State child sex abuse scandal when Baldwin was the general counsel for Pennsylvania State University, suggested that Saylor was using alleged technical errors Baldwin had made during the case as a pretext for disciplinary hearings that were actually intended as harassment.

=== Post-Supreme Court career ===
Following his 2021 retirement from the Pennsylvania Supreme Court, Saylor was appointed to the newly created post of Judicial Scholar-in-Residence at the Thomas R. Kline Center for Judicial Education of the Thomas R. Kline School of Law at Duquesne University. Effective on January 1, 2022, the position involves Saylor in Duquesne's development of "substantive and skill-based courses that meet the needs of Pennsylvania's more than 500 trial and appellate jurists," according to representatives of the Kline Center.

=== Awards and other honors ===
Saylor was awarded honorary doctor of law degrees by Shippensburg University of Pennsylvania and the Widener University School of Law.

In 2015, Saylor's hometown of Meyersdale named its community center after him.

Legal offices
Preceded by Ronald D. Castille	Chief Justice of the Pennsylvania Supreme Court; 2015–2021	Succeeded by Max Baer
