= Commonwealth Court of Pennsylvania =

Appellate court in Pennsylvania, US

- Established: 1968
- Jurisdiction: Pennsylvania cases which involve decisions of governmental agencies; public sector legal questions; actions to which the Commonwealth is a party other than criminal cases; or actions to which a not-for-profit, private corporation is a party.
- Location: Harrisburg (headquarters); Philadelphia; Pittsburgh
- Composition method: Statewide partisan election with possible retention at term expiration. Vacancies are filled via appointment by the Governor.
- Authorised by: Penn. Const. Art. V § 3; 42 Pa. Cons. Stat. § 561-64
- Appeals to: Supreme Court of Pennsylvania
- Appeals from: Court of Common Pleas; Superior Court
- Judge term length: 10 years
- Number of positions: 9
- Website: Commonwealth Court

President Judge
- Currently: Renée Cohn Jubelirer
- Since: January 7, 2022

Court locations

The Commonwealth Court of Pennsylvania is one of Pennsylvania's two intermediate appellate courts. The Commonwealth Court's headquarters is in Harrisburg, Pennsylvania, with jurisdiction over administrative and civil public law. The Superior Court of Pennsylvania is the other intermediate appellate court in the Pennsylvania Unified Judicial System, having jurisdiction over criminal and private civil cases.

The jurisdiction of the nine-judge Commonwealth Court is limited to appeals from final orders of certain state agencies and certain designated cases from the Courts of Common Pleas involving public sector legal questions, government regulation, and certain matters involving Not-for-profit organizations. The Commonwealth Court also functions as a trial court in some civil actions by or against the Commonwealth government and cases regarding statewide elections. (42 Pa.C.S. §§ 761–764).

Article V, section 4 of the 1968 Pennsylvania Constitution created the Commonwealth Court. Acts enacted in 1970 set up the court. Judges are elected to 10-year terms, and must retire at the age of 75.

The Commonwealth Court publishes its precedential opinions in the Atlantic Reporter 3d series. From 1970 to 1995, the court maintained an official reporter, Pennsylvania Commonwealth Court Reports, volumes 1–168 (1970–1995). The Court's precedential and non-precedential ("unreported") opinions are posted online.

Appeals from Commonwealth Court decisions go to the Supreme Court of Pennsylvania.

== Judges ==
Name	Born	Start	Term ends	Mandatory retirement (Note: Judges must retire by the last day (December 31) of the calendar year in which they reach the age of 75.)	Party	Law school
Renée Cohn Jubelirer, President Judge	May 25, 1957 (age 69)	January 7, 2002 (Note: Became President Judge on January 7, 2022.)	2031	2032	Republican	Northwestern
Patricia McCullough	November 15, 1956 (age 69)	January 4, 2010	2029	2031	Republican	Pittsburgh
Anne Covey	November 4, 1959 (age 66)	January 2, 2012	2031	2034	Republican	Widener
Michael Wojcik	September 24, 1964 (age 61)	January 4, 2016	2035	2039	Democratic	Pittsburgh
Christine Fizzano Cannon	October 8, 1969 (age 56)	January 1, 2018	2027	2044	Republican	Widener
Lori Dumas	December 2, 1967 (age 58)	January 3, 2022	2031	2042	Democratic	NCCU
Stacy Wallace	July 18, 1979 (age 46)	January 3, 2022	2031	2054	Republican	Duquesne
Matthew Wolf	1968 (age 57–58)	January 1, 2024	2033	2043	Democratic	Loyola-New Orleans
Stella Tsai	1963 (age 62–63)	January 5, 2026	2035	2038	Democratic	Penn

=== Senior judges ===
Name	Born	Party	Law school
Bonnie Leadbetter, President Judge Emerita	February 19, 1947 (age 79)	Republican	Pittsburgh
Mary Leavitt, President Judge Emerita	March 17, 1947 (age 79)	Republican	Dickinson
