= 2009 Pennsylvania elections =

- November 3, 2009

Elections were held in Pennsylvania on November 3, 2009, to fill a number of judicial positions and to allow judicial retention votes. The necessary primary elections were held on May 19, 2009.

== Justice of the Supreme Court ==
2009 Pennsylvania Supreme Court election
- November 3, 2009

Nominee	Joan Orie Melvin	Jack Panella
Party	Republican	Democratic
Popular vote	925,459	815,106
Percentage	53.2%	46.8%
- Melvin: 50–60% 60–70% 70–80% Panella: 50–60% 60–70% 70–80%
Justice before election
Jane Cutler Greenspan
Democratic
Elected Justice
Joan Orie Melvin
Republican

Voters were asked to fill a single vacancy on the Supreme Court of Pennsylvania. The vacant seat had been occupied by Justice Jane Cutler Greenspan, a Democrat who was appointed by Governor Ed Rendell, due to the retirement of Chief Justice Ralph Cappy. Justice Greenspan had agreed as a condition of her interim appointment in 2008 not to seek a full term on the court. Vying for the seat in the general election were Republican Joan Orie Melvin of Allegheny County and Democrat Jack A. Panella of Northampton County, both of whom were then serving on the Superior Court of Pennsylvania. Orie Melvin won the seat with 53 percent of the vote, restoring the 4–3 Republican majority that had existed on the court prior to the 2007 state election. Panella raised $2.4 million for the campaign, compared to $734,000 for Orie Melvin. Low voter turnout, especially in Panella's native Philadelphia, played a key role in Orie Melvin's victory.

=== Democratic primary ===
==== Candidates ====
- Jack Panella, Judge of the Superior Court of Pennsylvania

===== Withdrew =====
- Teresa Sarmina, Judge of the Philadelphia County Court of Common Pleas

==== Results ====
Democratic primary results
Party	Candidate	Votes	%
Democratic	Jack Panella	534,953	100.0%
Total votes		534,953	100.0%

=== Republican primary ===
==== Candidates ====
- Cheryl Lynn Allen, Judge of the Superior Court of Pennsylvania
- Joan Orie Melvin, Judge of the Superior Court of Pennsylvania
- Paul Panepinto, Judge of the Philadelphia County Court of Common Pleas

===== Withdrew =====
- Jacqueline Shogan, Judge of the Superior Court of Pennsylvania

==== Results ====
Primary results by county Melvin: 30%–40%; 40%–50%; 50%–60%; 60%–70%; 70%–80%; Allen: 40%–50%; 50%–60%; Panepinto: 60%–70%

Republican primary results
Party	Candidate	Votes	%
Republican	Joan Orie Melvin	304,339	54.77%
Republican	Cheryl Lynn Allen	151,688	27.30%
Republican	Paul Panepinto	99,641	17.93%
Total votes		555,668	100.0%

=== General election ===
==== Results ====
2009 Pennsylvania Supreme Court election
Party	Candidate	Votes	%
Republican	Joan Orie Melvin	925,459	53.17%
Democratic	Jack A. Panella	815,106	46.83%
Total votes		1,740,565	100.0%
Republican gain from Democratic			

== Judge of the Superior Court ==
2009 Pennsylvania Superior Court election
- November 3, 2009

4 seats of the Superior Court of Pennsylvania
	Majority party	Minority party
Candidate	Judith Olson; Sallie Mundy; Paula Ott; Temp Smith	Anne Lazarus; Robert Colville; Kevin Francis McCarthy; Teresa Sarmina
Party	Republican	Democratic
Last election	10	5
Seats won	3	1
Seat change	Steady	Steady
Popular vote	3,354,601	2,856,666
Percentage	52.92%	45.07%
- County results Republican: 40–50% 50–60% 60–70% 70–80% Democrat: 40–50% 50–60% 70–80%

Four seats on the Superior Court were up for grabs. On the ballot in the general election were four Republicans, four Democrats, and one Libertarian. Originally only three seats were up for election, but Judge Maureen Lally-Green announced her retirement after the May primary election. As a result, both parties picked an additional fourth nominee at a party convention. The Pennsylvania Republican Party picked Paula Ott, President Judge of the Chester County Court of Common Pleas, while the Pennsylvania Democratic Party picked Teresa Sarmina, Judge of the Philadelphia County Court of Common Pleas, as their nominees.

The original three vacant seats on the Superior Court was caused by the election of then-Judges Debra Todd and Seamus McCaffery, both Democrats, to the Pennsylvania Supreme Court in 2007. Governor Ed Rendell appointed Republican John Cleland and Democrat Robert Freedberg as interim appointments to replace Justice Todd and Justice McCaffery respectively. Neither interim-appointed Judge ran for a full term. The third vacancy was caused by the mandatory retirement of Judge Richard Klein after reaching the age of 70.

Republican candidate Judy Olson won the most votes, followed by fellow Republicans Sallie Mundy and Paula Ott. There was a four-way near tie for fourth place, with Democrat Anne E. Lazarus in the lead (with 11.5% of the vote) but closely trailed by Democrat Robert J. Colville (11.4%), Republican Temp Smith (11.4%), and Democrat Kevin Francis McCarthy (11.3%). The close results triggered an optional automatic recount. While candidates Colville and McCarthy opted out of the recount, Smith declined to do so, prompting Secretary of State Pedro Cortés to order a recount to begin on November 18—the first automatic statewide recount in Pennsylvania history. On December 1, the Pennsylvania Department of State announced that the recount had been completed, with the results essentially unchanged; Lazarus won the fourth seat. The cost of the recount was $542,000.

=== Republican primary ===
==== Candidates ====
- Sallie Mundy, Tioga County litigator
- Judy Olson, Judge of the Allegheny County Court of Common Pleas
- Templeton Smith Jr., Allegheny County lawyer

==== Results ====
Republican primary results (vote for 3)
Party	Candidate	Votes	%
Republican	Judy Olson	406,755	37.18%
Republican	Sallie Mundy	366,527	33.51%
Republican	Temp Smith	320,646	29.31%
Total votes		1,093,928	100.0%

=== Democratic primary ===
==== Candidates ====
- Robert Colville, Judge of the Allegheny County Court of Common Pleas
- Anne Lazarus, Judge of the Philadelphia County Court of Common Pleas
- Tom Munley, Judge of the Lackawanna County Court of Common Pleas
- Kevin Francis McCarthy, Allegheny County assistant district attorney
- Paula Patrick, Judge of the Philadelphia County Court of Common Pleas
- John Younge, Judge of the Philadelphia County Court of Common Pleas

==== Results ====
Democratic primary results (vote for 3)
Party	Candidate	Votes	%
Democratic	Robert Colville	311,619	20.36%
Democratic	Kevin Francis McCarthy	295,372	19.30%
Democratic	Anne Lazarus	293,095	19.15%
Democratic	Paula Patrick	234,196	15.30%
Democratic	Tom Munley	206,878	13.52%
Democratic	John Younge	189,057	12.35%
Total votes		1,530,217	100.0%

=== General election ===
==== Results ====
2009 Pennsylvania Superior Court election (vote for 4)
Party	Candidate	Votes	%
Republican	Judy Olson	954,065	15.05%
Republican	Sallie Mundy	870,091	13.73%
Republican	Paula Ott	807,328	12.74%
Democratic	Anne E. Lazarus	726,917	11.47%
Democratic	Robert J. Colville	724,830	11.43%
Republican	Temp Smith	723,117	11.41%
Democratic	Kevin Francis McCarthy	714,237	11.27%
Democratic	Teresa Sarmina	690,682	10.90%
Libertarian	Marakay J. Rogers	127,492	2.01%
Total votes		6,338,759	100.0%
Republican hold			
Republican hold			
Republican hold			
Democratic hold			

== Judge of the Commonwealth Court ==
2009 Pennsylvania Commonwealth Court election
- November 3, 2009

2 seats of the Commonwealth Court of Pennsylvania
	Majority party	Minority party
Candidate	Patricia McCullough; Kevin Brobson	Linda Judson; Barbara Ernsberger
Party	Republican	Democratic
Last election	5	4
Seats won	2	0
Seat change	▲1	▼1
Popular vote	1,743,493	1,470,504
Percentage	54.25%	45.75%
- County results Republican: 50–60% 60–70% 70–80% Democrat: 50–60% 60–70% 70–80%

There were two open seats on the Commonwealth Court of Pennsylvania. Judge James Gardner Colins resigned in January 2008, while Judge Shelly Friedman reached the mandatory retirement age on December 31, 2008. Both Colins and Friedman were initially elected as Democrats. Governor Ed Rendell nominated Johnny G. Butler, a Republican, to fill the vacant seat of Judge James Gardner Colins. Judge Butler did not run for a full term.

The Candidates in the general election were selected in the Pennsylvania Municipal Primary Election which was held May 19, 2009. The two leading Republican candidates in the Primary were Patricia A. McCullough (36.2%) and Kevin Brobson (35.9%), followed by Al Frioni (27.9%). The two leading Democratic candidates were Barbara Behrend Ernsberger (22.0%) and Linda Judson (21.1%) followed by Jimmy Lynn (15.3%) Michael Sherman (14.9%) Stephen Pollok (13.5%) and Daniel Brickmont (13.3%). The General Election was held on Tuesday November 3, 2009.

=== Republican primary ===
==== Candidates ====
- Kevin Brobson, shareholder, Buchanan Ingersoll & Rooney (Harrisburg office)
- Alfonso Frioni, commissioner of the Pennsylvania Workers' Compensation Appeals Board
- Patricia McCullough, executive director of the Catholic Charities Diocese of Pittsburgh, former Judge of the Allegheny County Court of Common Pleas

==== Results ====
Republican primary results (vote for 2)
Party	Candidate	Votes	%
Republican	Patricia McCullough	308,346	37.21%
Republican	Kevin Brobson	291,387	35.17%
Republican	Al Frioni	228,842	27.62%
Total votes		828,575	100.0%

=== Democratic primary ===
==== Candidates ====
- Daniel Bricmont, personal injury attorney
- Barbara Behrend Ernsberger, general practitioner, Behrend & Ernsberger, P.C. (Pittsburgh-based law firm)
- Linda Judson, Workers' compensation lawyer, Treasurer of the Pittsburgh Parking Authority Board
- James "Jimmy" Lynn, Judge of the Philadelphia County Court of Common Pleas
- Stephen Pollock, member of the Pennsylvania State Planning Board, former co-chair of the Philadelphia Bar Association's Committee on Zoning, Land Use and Code Enforcement
- Michael Sherman, managing partner, Fried, Kane, Walters, Zuschlag & Grochmal (Pittsburgh-based law firm)

==== Results ====
Democratic primary results (vote for 2)
Party	Candidate	Votes	%
Democratic	Barbara Behrend Ernsberger	231,039	21.81%
Democratic	Linda S. Judson	227,207	21.45%
Democratic	Jimmy Lynn	161,424	15.24%
Democratic	Michael Sherman	157,361	14.86%
Democratic	Stephen Pollock	142,121	13.42%
Democratic	Daniel Bricmont	139,961	13.21%
Total votes		1,059,113	100.0%

=== General election ===
==== Results ====
2009 Pennsylvania Commonwealth Court election (vote for 2)
Party	Candidate	Votes	%
Republican	Patricia A. McCullough	903,745	28.12%
Republican	Kevin Brobson	839,748	26.13%
Democratic	Linda S. Judson	741,263	23.06%
Democratic	Barbara Behrend Ernsberger	729,241	22.69%
Total votes		3,213,997	100.0%
Republican hold			
Republican gain from Democratic			

== Judicial retention ==
=== Superior Court ===
Voters elected to retain Judge Kate Ford Elliott on the Superior Court.

Judge Kate Ford Elliott (D) Retention, 2009
Choice	Votes	%
For	973,175	68.90
Against	439,272	31.10
Total	1,412,447	100.00
Source: PA Department of State

=== Commonwealth Court ===
Voters elected to retain Judge Dan Pellegrini on the Commonwealth Court.

Judge Dan Pellegrini (D) Retention, 2009
Choice	Votes	%
For	948,784	67.26
Against	461,799	32.74
Total	1,410,583	100.00
Source: PA Department of State
