= 2007 Pennsylvania elections =

- November 6, 2007

Elections were held in Pennsylvania on November 6, 2007. Primary elections for various state offices were held on May 15, 2007.

== Justice of the Supreme Court ==
2007 Pennsylvania Supreme Court election
- November 6, 2007

2 seats of the Supreme Court of Pennsylvania
	Majority party	Minority party
Candidate	Seamus McCaffery; Debra Todd	Maureen Lally-Green; Mike Krancer
Party	Democratic	Republican
Last election	3	4
Seats won	2	0
Seat change	▲1	▼1
Popular vote	2,317,815	1,778,395
Percentage	56.58%	43.42%
- County results Democrat: 50–60% 60–70% 80–90% Republican: 50–60% 60–70%

Two seats were open on the Pennsylvania Supreme Court, after Justice Russell Nigro, a Democrat, and Justice Sandra Schultz Newman, a Republican, vacated their seats. Justice Nigro vacated his seat on December 31, 2005, after failing to be retained for an additional 10-year term. Justice Schultz Newman, unlike her counterpart, did succeed in being retained to an additional 10-year term in 2005, but decided to retire on December 31, 2006. Governor Ed Rendell appointed Cynthia Baldwin, a Democrat, and James Fitzgerald, a Republican, to fill the vacancies of Justice Nigro and Justice Schultz Newman, respectively. Neither incumbent Justice sought reelection.

The election of Justices McCaffery and Todd, flipped the Supreme Court from a 4–3 Republican majority to a 4–3 Democratic majority.

=== Democratic primary ===
==== Candidates ====
- Willis W. Berry, Judge of the Philadelphia County Court of Common Pleas
- C. Darnell Jones, Judge of the Philadelphia County Court of Common Pleas
- Seamus McCaffery, Judge of the Superior Court of Pennsylvania
- Debra Todd, Judge of the Superior Court of Pennsylvania

==== Results ====
Democratic primary results (vote for 2)
Party	Candidate	Votes	%
Democratic	Debra Todd	515,909	35.68%
Democratic	Seamus McCaffery	452,662	31.31%
Democratic	C. Darnell Jones	261,200	18.07%
Democratic	Willis W. Berry	216,033	14.94%
Total votes		1,445,804	100.0%

=== Republican primary ===
==== Candidates ====
- Mike Krancer, Chief Judge of the Pennsylvania Environmental Hearing Board
- Maureen Lally-Green, Judge of the Superior Court of Pennsylvania
- Paul Panepinto, Judge of the Philadelphia County Court of Common Pleas

==== Results ====
Republican primary results (vote for 2)
Party	Candidate	Votes	%
Republican	Maureen E. Lally-Green	530,827	42.37%
Republican	Mike Krancer	459,990	36.71%
Republican	Paul P. Panepinto	262,090	20.92%
Total votes		1,252,907	100.0%

=== General election ===
==== Results ====
2007 Pennsylvania Supreme Court election (vote for 2)
Party	Candidate	Votes	%
Democratic	Seamus McCaffery	1,233,265	30.11%
Democratic	Debra Todd	1,084,550	26.48%
Republican	Maureen Lally-Green	994,760	24.28%
Republican	Mike Krancer	783,635	19.13%
Total votes		4,096,210	100.0%
Democratic hold			
Democratic gain from Republican			

== Judge of the Superior Court ==
2009 Pennsylvania Superior Court election
- November 6, 2007

3 seats of the Superior Court of Pennsylvania
	Majority party	Minority party
Candidate	Christine Donohue; Ron Folino; John Younge	Cheryl Lynn Allen; Jacqueline Shogan; Bruce Bratton
Party	Democratic	Republican
Last election	6	9
Seats won	1	2
Seat change	Steady	Steady
Popular vote	2,882,451	2,779,274
Percentage	50.91%	49.09%
- County results Democrat: 50–60% 60–70% 80–90% Republican: 50–60% 60–70% 70–80%

Initially, there were only two seats open on the Superior Court of Pennsylvania. These seats were open due to the retirement of Judge Joseph A. Del Sole, a Democrat, in September 2006, as well as the impending mandatory retirement of Judge Joseph A. Hudock, a Democrat, on December 31, 2007. Judge Del Sole's seat was held by Judge Robert C. Daniels, a Republican who was appointed by Governor Ed Rendell. Judge Daniels did not run for re-election.

A third seat was on the November ballot because Judge Michael T. Joyce announced his retirement to be scheduled for January 2008 after being indicted by a grand jury for mail fraud and money laundering. Since Judge Joyce announced his retirement after the May primary, the Democratic and Republican state committees nominated a third candidate at their respective party conventions. Jacqueline Shogan, a Pittsburgh attorney, was chosen as the Republican candidate, after facing opposition from state senator Jane Earll. John Younge, a Judge on the Philadelphia County Court of Common Pleas, was chosen as the Democratic nominee, facing no opposition. Both Shogan and Younge had earlier lost the race for their respective nominations in the May primary.

=== Democratic primary ===
==== Candidates ====
- James M. DeLeon, Judge of the Philadelphia Municipal Court
- Christine Donohue, commercial litigator, Buchanan Ingersoll & Rooney PC; chair of the Pennsylvania Board of Law Examiners (1990–1996)
- Ron Folino, Judge of the Allegheny County Court of Common Pleas
- Anne L. Lazarus, Judge of the Philadelphia County Court of Common Pleas
- Jimmy Lynn, Judge of the Philadelphia County Court of Common Pleas
- Timothy J. McCormick, Greensburg city solicitor
- John Milton Younge, Judge of the Philadelphia County Court of Common Pleas

==== Results ====
Democratic primary results (vote for 2)
Party	Candidate	Votes	%
Democratic	Christine Donohue	376,644	25.72%
Democratic	Ron Folino	263,760	18.01%
Democratic	Anne E. Lazarus	255,284	17.43%
Democratic	Timothy J. McCormick	254,512	17.38%
Democratic	John Milton Younge	124,474	8.50%
Democratic	Jimmy Lynn	101,569	6.94%
Democratic	Jame M. DeLeon	88,313	6.03%
Total votes		1,464,556	100.0%

=== Republican primary ===
==== Candidates ====
- Cheryl Lynn Allen, Judge of the Allegheny County Court of Common Pleas
- Bruce F. Bratton, Judge of the Dauphin County Court of Common Pleas
- Jacqueline O. Shogan, health law litigator

==== Results ====
Republican primary results (vote for 2)
Party	Candidate	Votes	%
Republican	Cheryl Lynn Allen	416,730	35.49%
Republican	Bruce F. Bratton	383,444	32.66%
Republican	Jacqueline O. Shogan	373,915	31.85%
Total votes		1,174,089	100.0%

=== General election ===
==== Results ====
2007 Pennsylvania Superior Court election (vote for 3)
Party	Candidate	Votes	%
Democratic	Christine Donohue	1,100,362	19.44%
Republican	Jackie Shogan	974,748	17.22%
Republican	Cheryl Lynn Allen	970,081	17.13%
Democratic	Ron Folino	929,552	16.42%
Democratic	John Younge	852,537	15.06%
Republican	Bruce F. Bratton	834,445	14.74%
Total votes		5,661,725	100.0%
Democratic hold			
Republican hold			
Republican hold			

== Judicial retention ==
=== Supreme Court ===
Justice Thomas G. Saylor (R) retention, 2007
Choice	Votes	%
For	1,184,546	66.89
Against	586,330	33.11
Total	1,770,876	100.00
Source: PA Department of State

=== Superior Court ===
Judge Joan Orie Melvin (R) retention, 2007
Choice	Votes	%
For	1,157,431	67.02
Against	569,538	32.98
Total	1,726,969	100.00
Source: PA Department of State

Judge John L. Musmanno (D) retention, 2007
Choice	Votes	%
For	1,048,803	62.06
Against	641,302	37.94
Total	1,690,105	100.00
Source: PA Department of State

Judge Correale F. Stevens (R) retention, 2007
Choice	Votes	%
For	1,083,484	63.92
Against	611,503	36.08
Total	1,694,987	100.00
Source: PA Department of State

=== Commonwealth Court ===
Judge Bonnie B. Leadbetter (R) retention, 2007
Choice	Votes	%
For	1,062,403	63.44
Against	612,136	36.56
Total	1,674,539	100.00
Source: PA Department of State

Judge Bernard L. McGinley (D) retention, 2007
Choice	Votes	%
For	1,039,215	62.75
Against	616,828	37.25
Total	1,656,043	100.00
Source: PA Department of State

Judge Doris A. Smith-Ribner (D) retention, 2007
Choice	Votes	%
For	1,051,793	62.90
Against	620,319	37.10
Total	1,672,112	100.00
Source: PA Department of State
