= Anne E. Lazarus =

American judge (born 1952)

President Judge of the Superior Court of Pennsylvania
- Incumbent
- Assumed office January 7, 2024
- Preceded by: Jack Panella

Judge of the Superior Court of Pennsylvania
- Incumbent
- Assumed office January 4, 2010

Personal details
- Born: November 12, 1952 (age 73)
- Party: Democratic
- Education: State University of New York (B.A.); Temple University Beasley School of Law (J.D.) (M.L.)

Anne E. Lazarus (born November 12, 1952) is an American lawyer and jurist who currently serves as the President Judge of the Superior Court of Pennsylvania. A member of the Democratic Party, Lazarus was elected to the Superior Court on November 3, 2009. She is the first woman from Philadelphia to be elected to any statewide office.

== Early life and education ==
Anne E. Lazarus was born in Brooklyn, New York in 1952, making her the oldest judge on the Superior Court.

Lazarus received her B.A. degree in psychology from the State University of New York at Stony Brook in 1972. She then received her J.D. and M.L. from the Temple University Beasley School of Law in 1976 and 1986, respectively.

== Legal career ==
Lazarus served as legal counsel to the Philadelphia Orphans’ Court from 1980 to 1991. She practiced law in Philadelphia at Ballard Spahr Andrews & Ingersoll, LLP until she received an appointment by Governor Robert Casey Sr. to Philadelphia Court of Common Pleas. She was elected to the Philadelphia Court of Common Pleas for a full term in 1991, and served until 2010 when she joined the Superior Court of Pennsylvania.

Lazarus has received numerous awards during her tenure; including the Philadelphia Bar Association's Sandra Day O’Connor Award in 2013, and the Pennsylvania Bar Association's Anne X. Alpern Award in 2018.

Lazarus ran for the Supreme Court of Pennsylvania in 2015, but failed during the primary by not achieving a position in the top three candidates.

Lazarus ran for retention to the Superior Court of Pennsylvania in 2019, and was retained for second ten-year term. Her current term ends January 7, 2030.

Lazarus was voted on by the Superior Court of Pennsylvania to serve as the President Judge, which she assumed office for on January 7, 2024. The Superior Court was unanimous in their selection of Judge Lazarus as President Judge.

== Notable cases ==
In the case of Commonwealth v. Alexander (2020), Lazarus and two other judges from the Superior Court upheld Markee Davis' conviction. In January 2020, an officer pulled over Davis for recklessly driving and saw a semi-automatic handgun on the floor of the vehicle. Davis was arrested for numerous charges, including possession of a controlled substance. The trial court granted the suppression and exclusion of Davis' statements and the marijuana found in the trunk of the car, but denied suppression of the handgun. The Superior Court upheld Davis' conviction, further ruling that the officer's seize of the firearm was lawful. The court ruled that the commonwealth was not required to prove exigent circumstances when an officer is seizing a firearm in a vehicle under the plain view doctrine. Lazarus, who authored the opinion of the Court, stated,

To the extent that Davis claims Alexander requires the Commonwealth to prove exigent circumstances where the officers have lawfully seized an object under the plain view doctrine, he is mistaken.

In the case of Commonwealth v. Ganjeh (2023), Lazarus was on a three-member panel of Superior Court judges that denied an appeal by Dana Ganjeh, a man who is serving a life without parole sentence for murdering a Linda Frick, a 54-year-old woman whose body was found deceased in August 2018.

== 2009 Superior Court Election ==
Democratic primary results (vote for 3)
Party	Candidate	Votes	%
Democratic	Robert Colville	311,619	20.36%
Democratic	Kevin Francis McCarthy	295,372	19.30%
Democratic	Anne Lazarus	293,095	19.15%
Democratic	Paula Patrick	234,196	15.30%
Democratic	Tom Munley	206,878	13.52%
Democratic	John Younge	189,057	12.35%
Total votes		1,530,217	100.0%

2009 Pennsylvania Superior Court election (vote for 4)
Party	Candidate	Votes	%
Republican	Judy Olson	954,065	15.05%
Republican	Sallie Mundy	870,091	13.73%
Republican	Paula Ott	807,328	12.74%
Democratic	Anne E. Lazarus	726,917	11.47%
Democratic	Robert J. Colville	724,830	11.43%
Republican	Temp Smith	723,117	11.41%
Democratic	Kevin Francis McCarthy	714,237	11.27%
Democratic	Teresa Sarmina	690,682	10.90%
Libertarian	Marakay J. Rogers	127,492	2.01%
Total votes		6,338,759	100.0%
Republican hold			
Republican hold			
Republican hold			
Democratic hold			

== 2015 Supreme Court Primary Election ==
Democratic primary results (vote for 3)
Party	Candidate	Votes	%
Democratic	David Wecht	379,819	22.02%
Democratic	Kevin Dougherty	368,629	21.37%
Democratic	Christine Donohue	368,247	21.35%
Democratic	Anne Lazarus	289,726	16.79%
Democratic	Dwayne Woodruff	200,193	11.60%
Democratic	John H. Foradora	118,561	6.87%
Total votes		1,725,175	100.0%

== 2019 Retention Election ==
Judge Anne Lazarus Retention (D), 2019
Choice	Votes	%
For	1,500,891	74.49
Against	513,912	25.51
Total	2,014,803	100.00
Source: PA Department of State
