= 2015 Pennsylvania elections =

- November 3, 2015

Elections were held in Pennsylvania on November 3, 2015, to fill judicial positions (including three seats on the Supreme Court), to fill a vacancy in the Pennsylvania State Senate, to allow judicial retention votes, and to fill numerous county, local and municipal offices.

The necessary primary elections were held on May 19, 2015.

== Justice of the Supreme Court ==
2015 Pennsylvania Supreme Court election
- November 3, 2015

3 seats on the Pennsylvania Supreme Court 4 seats needed for a majority

	Majority party	Minority party
Candidate	Kevin Dougherty; David Wecht; Christine Donohue	Judith F. Olson; Michael George; Anne Covey
Party	Democratic	Republican
Last election	3	4
Seats before	2	2
Seats won	3	0
Seats after	5	2
Seat change	▲3	Steady
Popular vote	3,237,329 (Note: Voters selected up to three candidates, so vote totals are inflated.)	2,502,380
Percentage	55.0%	42.5%
- County results: Democrats: 50-60% 60-70% 70-80% >90% Republicans: 50-60% 60-70% 70-80%

There were three open seats on the Pennsylvania Supreme Court.

- Justice Joan Orie Melvin resigned on May 1, 2013. Governor Tom Corbett nominated Superior Court Judge Correale Stevens as an interim appointee. Justice Stevens indicated he would run for a full term.
- The second vacancy was caused by the resignation of Justice Seamus McCaffery on October 27, 2014.
- The third vacancy was due to the mandatory retirement of Chief Justice Ronald Castille on December 31, 2014.

Judge Paul Panepinto, a registered Republican, of the Philadelphia County Court of Common Pleas, ran in the general election as an independent candidate.

=== Democratic primary ===
==== Candidates ====
- Christine Donohue, Judge of the Pennsylvania Superior Court
- Kevin Dougherty, Judge of the Philadelphia County Court of Common Pleas
- John H. Foradora, President Judge of the Jefferson County Court of Common Pleas
- Anne E. Lazarus, Judge of the Pennsylvania Superior Court
- David Wecht, Judge of the Pennsylvania Superior Court
- Dwayne Woodruff, Judge of the Allegheny County Court of Common Pleas

==== Endorsements ====
Kevin Dougherty

Political parties

- Pennsylvania Democratic Party
David Wecht

Political parties

- Pennsylvania Democratic Party

==== Results ====
Democratic primary results (vote for not more than 3)
Party	Candidate	Votes	%
Democratic	David Wecht	379,819	22.02%
Democratic	Kevin Dougherty	368,629	21.37%
Democratic	Christine Donohue	368,247	21.35%
Democratic	Anne Lazarus	289,726	16.79%
Democratic	Dwayne Woodruff	200,193	11.60%
Democratic	John H. Foradora	118,561	6.87%
Total votes		1,725,175	100.0%

=== Republican primary ===
==== Candidates ====
- Cheryl Allen, Judge of the Pennsylvania Superior Court
- Ann Covey, Judge of the Pennsylvania Commonwealth Court
- Michael George, President Judge of the Adams County Court of Common Pleas
- Judith Olson, Judge of the Pennsylvania Superior Court
- Correale Stevens, incumbent Justice of the Pennsylvania Supreme Court
- Rebecca L. Warren, Montour County district attorney

===== Withdrew =====
- Renee Cohn Jubelirer, Judge of the Pennsylvania Commonwealth Court

==== Endorsements ====
Anne Covey

Political parties

- Pennsylvania Republican Party
Michael George

Political parties

- Pennsylvania Republican Party
Judy Olson

Political parties

- Pennsylvania Republican Party

==== Results ====
Republican primary results (vote for not more than 3)
Party	Candidate	Votes	%
Republican	Judith Olson	303,735	22.00%
Republican	Michael George	302,778	21.93%
Republican	Anne Covey	285,007	20.64%
Republican	Cheryl Allen	183,273	13.27%
Republican	Rebecca L. Warren	159,450	11.55%
Republican	Correale Stevens (incumbent)	146,528	10.61%
Total votes		1,380,771	100.0%

=== General election ===
==== Endorsements ====
Christine Donohue (D)

Newspapers

- The Patriot-News
- The Philadelphia Inquirer
- The Pittsburgh Post-Gazette
Michael George (R)

Newspapers

- The Pittsburgh Tribune-Review
Judy Olson (R)

Newspapers

- The Patriot-News
- The Philadelphia Inquirer
- The Pittsburgh Post-Gazette
- The Pittsburgh Tribune-Review
David Wecht (D)

Newspapers

- The Patriot-News
- The Philadelphia Inquirer
- The Pittsburgh Post-Gazette
- The Pittsburgh Tribune-Review

==== Results ====
2015 Pennsylvania Supreme Court election (vote for not more than 3)
Party	Candidate	Votes	%
Democratic	Kevin Dougherty	1,088,716	18.50%
Democratic	David Wecht	1,079,452	18.34%
Democratic	Christine Donohue	1,069,161	18.17%
Republican	Judith Olson	895,741	15.22%
Republican	Michael George	803,748	13.66%
Republican	Anne Covey	802,891	13.64%
Independent	Paul Panepinto (Note: Appeared on ballot under the "Independent Judicial Alliance" party designation.)	145,190	2.47%
Total votes		5,884,899	100.0%
Democratic gain from Republican			
Democratic gain from Republican			
Democratic hold			

== Judge of the Superior Court ==
2015 Pennsylvania Superior Court election
- November 3, 2015

Nominee	Alice B. Dubow	Emil Giordano
Party	Democratic	Republican
Popular vote	1,058,753	933,691
Percentage	53.1%	46.9%
- County results Dubow: 50–60% 60–70% 80–90% Giordano: 50–60% 60–70% 70–80%
Judge before election
Patricia Jenkins
Republican
Elected Judge
Alice Dubow
Democratic

A seat was up for election due to the appointment of Judge Correale Stevens to the Pennsylvania Supreme Court. Governor Corbett appointed Patricia Jenkins to the vacancy through the 2015 election, who opted to not run for re-election.

=== Democratic primary ===
==== Candidates ====
- Robert J. Colville, Judge of the Allegheny County Court of Common Pleas
- Alice Beck Dubow, Judge of the Philadelphia County Court of Common Pleas

==== Results ====
Primary results by county Dubow: 50%–60%; 60%–70%; 70%–80%; 80%–90%; Colville: 50%–60%; 60%–70%; 70%–80%; 80%–90%

Democratic primary results
Party	Candidate	Votes	%
Democratic	Alice Dubow	389,282	58.75%
Democratic	Robert J. Colville	273,346	41.25%
Total votes		662,628	100.0%

=== Republican primary ===
==== Candidates ====
- Emil Giordano, Judge of the Northampton County Court of Common Pleas

==== Results ====
Republican primary results
Party	Candidate	Votes	%
Republican	Emil Giordano	464,178	100.0%
Total votes		464,178	100.0%

=== General election ===
==== Results ====
2015 Pennsylvania Superior Court election
Party	Candidate	Votes	%
Democratic	Alice Dubow	1,058,753	53.14%
Republican	Emil Giordano	933,691	46.86%
Total votes		1,992,444	100.0%
Democratic gain from Republican			

== Judge of the Commonwealth Court ==
2015 Pennsylvania Commonwealth Court election
- November 3, 2015

Nominee	Michael Wojcik	Paul Lalley
Party	Democratic	Republican
Popular vote	1,060,314	946,079
Percentage	52.8%	47.2%
- County results Wojcik: 50–60% 60–70% 80–90% Lalley: 50–60% 60–70% 70–80%
Judge before election
Dan Pellegrini
Democratic
Elected Judge
Michael Wojcik
Democratic

There was one vacancy to fill on the Pennsylvania Commonwealth Court, due to the mandatory retirement of President Judge Dan Pellegrini.

=== Democratic primary ===
==== Candidates ====
- Todd Eagen, labor attorney
- Michael Woljcik, former Allegheny County solicitor

==== Results ====
Primary results by county Wojcik: 50%–60%; 60%–70%; 70%–80%; 80%–90%; Eagen: 50%–60%; 60%–70%; 70%–80%; 80%–90%; 90%–100%

Democratic primary results
Party	Candidate	Votes	%
Democratic	Michael Wojcik	331,601	53.35%
Democratic	R. Todd Eagen	290,008	46.65%
Total votes		621,609	100.0%

=== Republican primary ===
==== Candidates ====
- Paul Lalley, senior associate attorney at Campbell, Durant, Beatty, Palombo & Miller, Lalley firm

==== Results ====
Republican primary results
Party	Candidate	Votes	%
Republican	Paul Lalley	475,657	100.0%
Total votes		475,657	100.0%

=== General election ===
==== Results ====
2015 Pennsylvania Commonwealth Court election
Party	Candidate	Votes	%
Democratic	Michael Wojcik	1,060,314	52.85%
Republican	Paul Lalley	946,079	47.15%
Total votes		2,006,393	100.0%
Democratic hold			

== 37th Senatorial District Special Election ==
There was one vacancy to fill in the Pennsylvania State Senate, in the 37th district, created by the resignation of Matthew H. Smith.

Pennsylvania Senate, District 37 special election, 2015
Party	Candidate	Votes	%
Republican	Guy Reschenthaler	30,565	55.1
Democratic	Heather Arnet	24,888	44.9
Total votes		55,453	100.0
Republican gain from Democratic			

== See also ==
- Philadelphia mayoral election, 2015
