= 2001 Pennsylvania elections =

- November 6, 2001

Elections were held in Pennsylvania on November 6, 2001. Necessary primary elections were held on May 15, 2001.

== Justice of the Supreme Court ==
2001 Pennsylvania Supreme Court election
- November 6, 2001

Candidate	Michael Eakin	Kate Ford Elliott
Party	Republican	Democratic
Popular vote	1,051,360	954,053
Percentage	52.43%	47.57%
- County results Eakin: 50–60% 60–70% 70–80% Elliott: 50–60% 60–70% 80–90%
Elected Justice
Michael Eakin
Republican

=== Democratic primary ===
==== Candidate ====
- Kate Ford Elliott

==== Results ====
Democratic primary results
Party	Candidate	Votes	%
Democratic	Kate Ford Elliott	576,627	100.00
Total votes		576,627	100.00

=== Republican primary ===
==== Candidate ====
- Michael Eakin, Judge of the Superior Court of Pennsylvania

==== Results ====
Republican primary results
Party	Candidate	Votes	%
Republican	Michael Eakin	533,396	100.00
Total votes		533,396	100.00

=== General election ===
==== Results ====
Justice of the Supreme Court election, 2001
Party	Candidate	Votes	%
Republican	Michael Eakin	1,051,360	52.43
Democratic	Kate Ford Elliott	954,053	47.57
Total votes		2,005,413	100.00

== Judge of the Superior Court ==
2001 Pennsylvania Superior Court election
- November 6, 2001

3 seats of the Superior Court of Pennsylvania
	Majority party	Minority party
Candidate	Richard B. Klein; Mary Jane Bowes; John T. Bender	David Wecht; Lydia Y. Kirkland; Stephanie Domitrovich
Party	Republican	Democratic
Seats won	3	0
Popular vote	2,899,151	2,477,625
Percentage	53.92%	46.08%
- County results Republican: 50–60% 60–70% 70–80% Democrat: 50–60% 60–70% 70–80%

=== Democratic primary ===
==== Candidates ====
- Stephanie Domitrovich
- Lydia Y. Kirkland
- David Wecht

==== Results ====
Democratic primary results (vote for 3)
Party	Candidate	Votes	%
Democratic	David Wecht	493,322	35.15
Democratic	Lydia Y. Kirkland	465,945	33.20
Democratic	Stephanie Domitrovich	444,293	31.65
Total votes		1,403,560	100.00

=== Republican primary ===
==== Candidates ====
- John T. Bender
- Mary Jane Bowes
- Palmer Dolbin
- Richard B. Klein

==== Results ====
Republican primary results (vote for 3)
Party	Candidate	Votes	%
Republican	Mary Jane Bowes	428,013	29.14
Republican	Richard B. Klein	370,987	25.25
Republican	John T. Bender	336,485	22.90
Republican	Palmer Dolbin	333,583	22.71
Total votes		1,469,068	100.00

=== General election ===
==== Results ====
Judge of the Superior Court election, 2001
Party	Candidate	Votes	%
Republican	Richard B. Klein	1,011,943	18.82
Republican	Mary Jane Bowes	1,006,251	18.71
Republican	John T. Bender	880,957	16.38
Democratic	David Wecht	830,824	15.45
Democratic	Lydia Y. Kirkland	825,424	15.35
Democratic	Stephanie Domitrovich	821,377	15.28
Total votes		5,376,776	100.00

== Judge of the Commonwealth Court ==
2001 Pennsylvania Commonwealth Court election
- November 6, 2001

3 seats of the Commonwealth Court of Pennsylvania
	Majority party	Minority party
Candidate	Mary Hannah Leavitt; Renee Cohn; Robin Simpson	James J. Dodaro; Jerry Langan; Irwin W. Aronson
Party	Republican	Democratic
Seats won	3	0
Popular vote	2,839,610	2,435,548
Percentage	53.83%	46.17%
- County results Republican: 50–60% 60–70% 70–80% Democrat: 50–60% 60–70% 70–80%

=== Democratic primary ===
==== Candidates ====
- Irwin W. Aronson
- James J. Dodaro
- Jerry Langan

==== Results ====
Democratic primary results (vote for 3)
Party	Candidate	Votes	%
Democratic	James J. Dodaro	428,546	35.18
Democratic	Jerry Langan	413,117	33.92
Democratic	Irwin W. Aronson	376,393	30.90
Total votes		1,218,056	100.00

=== Republican primary ===
==== Candidates ====
- Renee Cohn
- Mary Hanna Leavitt
- Robin Simpson

==== Results ====
Republican primary results (vote for 3)
Party	Candidate	Votes	%
Republican	Renee Cohn	441,330	33.67
Republican	Robin Simpson	440,610	33.62
Republican	Mary Hanna Leavitt	428,685	32.71
Total votes		1,310,625	100.00

=== General election ===
==== Results ====
Judge of the Commonwealth Court election, 2001
Party	Candidate	Votes	%
Republican	Mary Hannah Leavitt	951,745	18.04
Republican	Renee Cohn	948,921	17.99
Republican	Robin Simpson	938,944	17.80
Democratic	James J. Dodaro	865,903	16.41
Democratic	Jerry Langan	821,909	15.58
Democratic	Irwin W. Aronson	821,377	14.17
Total votes		5,348,799	100.00

== Judicial retention ==
=== Supreme Court ===
Stephen Zappala, Sr. Retention, 2001
Choice	Votes	%
For	978,709	75.35
Against	320,175	24.65
Total	1,298,884	100.00
Source: PA Department of State

=== Superior Court ===
Stephen J. McEwen Jr. Retention, 2001
Choice	Votes	%
For	909,377	75.03
Against	302,669	24.97
Total	1,212,046	100.00
Source: PA Department of State

=== Commonwealth Court ===
Shelly Friedman Retention, 2001
Choice	Votes	%
For	890,799	73.75
Against	317,068	26.25
Total	1,207,867	100.00
Source: PA Department of State
