= Allegheny County Office of Children, Youth and Families =

County child welfare agency overview
- Formed: 1997
- Jurisdiction: Allegheny County, Pennsylvania, United States
- Headquarters: Pittsburgh, Pennsylvania
- Parent County child welfare agency: Allegheny County Department of Human Services
- Website: www.alleghenycounty.us/Services/Human-Services-DHS/DHS-Offices/Office-of-Children-Youth-and-Families

Allegheny County Office of Children, Youth and Families (CYF) or (OCYF) is the child welfare agency for Allegheny County, Pennsylvania. Operated within the Allegheny County Department of Human Services (DHS), CYF is responsible for investigating reports of child abuse and neglect, providing protective services, and arranging foster care, kinship care, and adoption when children cannot safely remain at home.

== History ==
Allegheny County established CYF in 1997 as part of a countywide consolidation of human services functions, making it one of the largest child welfare agencies in Pennsylvania.

== Mission and responsibilities ==
CYF's stated mission is to protect children from abuse and neglect, preserve families when possible, and ensure permanency through safe reunification or alternative permanent homes such as adoption. Under Pennsylvania's Child Protective Services Law and related regulations, CYF receives and investigates reports of suspected maltreatment, conducts risk and safety assessments, and develops service plans for families.

== Legal Issues ==
In Harrington v. UPMC et al., 2:20-cv-00497, a putative class action removed from Allegheny County Court of Common Pleas to the U.S. District Court for the Western District of Pennsylvania, named plaintiffs alleged that UPMC hospitals disclosed new mothers’ confidential medical information—such as self-reported past marijuana use or “unconfirmed positive” urine screens—to the Allegheny County Office of Children, Youth and Families without consent or a legally sufficient basis. The complaint further alleged that CYF routinely accepted and acted on these disclosures as the sole predicate for child-abuse/neglect investigations, including hospital-room interrogations, home inspections, family interviews, and demands for additional testing or services, pursuant to an alleged joint custom or agreement between the hospital system and the county agency. This case remains ongoing; the parties are currently seeking Class Certification.

On October 7, 2025, during oral arguments before the Supreme Court of Pennsylvania in In the Interest of G.G.B., 35 WAP 2025 (Pa. 2025), the Justices confronted Thomas Welschonce of KidsVoice and Sarah Itzkoff of OCYF regarding OCYF's choice to file a dependency petition in Allegheny County for a newborn who was born and remained hospitalized in West Virginia; the Justices quickly reframed the supposed “venue” question as a threshold jurisdictional problem that OCYF had not adequately addressed, pressing why Pennsylvania could act at all when the child was out of state and why the case was not first commenced in West Virginia. Justice Kevin Dougherty went so far as to call OCYF "incompetent". Justice Christine Donohue expressed frustration with the OCYF's request that the Justices “rewrite the venue statute” to rescue their errors. Justice David Wecht bluntly observed that OCYF was “on the firing line” for having “grabbed” the case in Allegheny County, characterized OCYF as "bullying", and expressed the Justice's overarching concern that the agency’s incompetence in choosing and defending the forum was driving the appeal more than any genuine statutory ambiguity.

== See also ==
- Pennsylvania Department of Human Services
- Allegheny County Law Department
- KidsVoice
