= Zappalà =

Zappalà or Zappala is a surname. Notable people with the surname include:

- Frank J. Zappala (1898–1988), American politician and lawyer
- Gregorio Zappalà (1833–1908), Italian sculptor
- Stefano Zappalà (1941–2018), Italian politician and Member of the European Parliament for Central with the Forza Italia
- Stephen Zappala, American Democratic politician and attorney who is the District Attorney of Allegheny County, Pennsylvania
- Stephen Zappala Sr. (1932–2021), American lawyer and former Pennsylvania Supreme Court Chief Justice
- Vincenzo Zappalà (born 1945), Italian astronomer

== See also ==
- 2813 Zappalà, main belt asteroid with an orbital period of 2030
- Zapala
