= 2011 Pennsylvania elections =

- November 8, 2011

Elections were held in Pennsylvania on November 8, 2011, to fill judicial positions and allow judicial retention votes. The necessary primary elections were held on May 17, 2011.

== Judge of the Superior Court ==
2011 Pennsylvania Superior Court election
- November 8, 2011

Nominee	David Wecht	Vic Stabile
Party	Democratic	Republican
Popular vote	1,030,004	859,484
Percentage	54.5%	45.5%
- County results Wecht: 50–60% 60–70% 70–80% 80–90% Stabile: 50–60% 60–70% 70–80%
Judge before election
Robert A. Freedberg
Democratic
Elected Judge
David Wecht
Democratic

There was one vacancy to fill on the Superior Court of Pennsylvania. The seat being vacated is currently held by Robert A. Freedberg, who decided not to run in the election because he would face mandatory retirement due to his age in three years.

=== Primary campaign ===
Vic Stabile, a partner in a Harrisburg law firm, and Paula A. Patrick, a judge on the Philadelphia County Court of Common Pleas, faced off for the Republican nomination. Both candidates received a rating of "recommended" from the Pennsylvania Bar Association. Stabile won the endorsement of the Republican State Committee. The Pittsburgh Post-Gazette also endorsed Stabile for the Republican nomination. The Philadelphia Inquirer endorsed Patrick.

On the Democratic side, David N. Wecht, currently a judge on the Allegheny County Court of Common Pleas, was the only candidate to file; therefore he ran unopposed in the Democratic primary election. He received a rating of "highly recommended" from the Pennsylvania Bar Association.

The election was held on May 17, 2011. Stabile won the Republican primary, receiving 378,566 votes (65.3%) against Patrick's 200,856 (34.7%). Wecht received 605,665 votes (100.0%).

Republican primary results by county Stabile: 50%–60%; 60%–70%; 70%–80%; 80%–90%; Patrick: 50%–60%; 60%–70%

Republican primary results
Party	Candidate	Votes	%
Republican	Vic Stabile	379,829	65.32%
Republican	Paula A. Patrick	201,679	34.68%
Total votes		581,508	100.0%

Democratic primary results
Party	Candidate	Votes	%
Democratic	David Wecht	606,793	100.0%
Total votes		606,793	100.0%

=== General election ===
Stabile and Wecht faced each other in the general election. Wecht was endorsed in the general election by The Philadelphia Inquirer and the Pittsburgh Post-Gazette, which both cited his judicial experience. Stabile was endorsed by The Patriot-News, which cited his "down-to-earth approach".

2011 Pennsylvania Superior Court election
Party	Candidate	Votes	%
Democratic	David Wecht	1,030,004	54.51%
Republican	Vic Stabile	859,484	45.49%
Total votes		1,889,488	100.0%
Democratic hold			

== Judge of the Commonwealth Court ==
2011 Pennsylvania Commonwealth Court election
- November 8, 2011

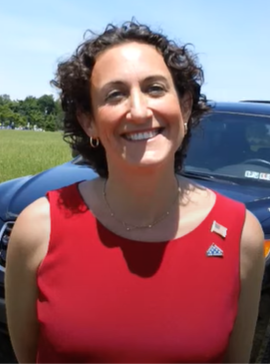
Nominee	Anne Covey	Kathryn Boockvar
Party	Republican	Democratic
Popular vote	968,796	890,831
Percentage	52.1%	47.9%
- County results Covey: 50–60% 60–70% 70–80% Boockvar: 50–60% 60–70% 70–80%
Judge before election
Johnny J. Butler
Republican
Elected Judge
Anne Covey
Republican

There was one vacancy on the Commonwealth Court of Pennsylvania. The seat to be vacated is currently held by Republican Johnny Butler, appointed after Judge Doris Smith-Ribner retired, who decided not to run in the election.

=== Primary campaign ===
Anne Covey, a private labor attorney, and Paul P. Panepinto, a judge on the Philadelphia County Court of Common Pleas, contended for the Republican nomination. They received bar association ratings of "recommended" and "highly recommended", respectively. Covey won the endorsement of the Republican State Committee. Covey was also endorsed for the Republican nomination by both The Philadelphia Inquirer and the Pittsburgh Post-Gazette.

Kathryn Boockvar, an attorney who most recently worked for the Advancement Project and had previously spent 11 years in private practice, and Barbara Behrend Ernsberger, who has spent her career in private practice, competed for the Democratic nomination. Boockvar received a rating of "recommended" from the Pennsylvania Bar Association; Ernsberger received a rating of "not recommended" because she did not participate in the bar association evaluation process. Boockvar won the endorsement of the Democratic State Committee. The Philadelphia Inquirer and the Pittsburgh Post-Gazette also endorsed Boockvar for the Democratic nomination.

In the election on May 17, 2011, Covey received 406,764 votes (70.3%) and Panepinto received 171,996 (29.7%). The Democratic race was much closer: the initial results showed that Boockvar had received 311,624 votes (50.2%) and Ernsberger had received 309,508 (49.8%). Because the margin was less than half of a percent, these results triggered a recount, mandatory unless waived by the trailing candidate. Ernsberger declined to waive her right to a recount. On June 8, 2011, the Secretary of the Commonwealth announced that the recount had confirmed Boockvar's victory. The figures were nearly the same; in the final tally, Boockvar had 311,732 votes (50.2%) and Ernsberger had 309,680 (49.8%).

Republican primary results by county Covey: 50%–60%; 60%–70%; 70%–80%; 80%–90%; Panepinto: 60%–70%

Republican primary results
Party	Candidate	Votes	%
Republican	Anne Covey	408,179	70.29%
Republican	Paul Panepinto	172,560	29.71%
Total votes		580,739	100.0%

Democratic primary results by county Boockvar: 50%–60%; 60%–70%; 70%–80%; 80%–90%; 90%–100%; Ernsberger: 50%–60%; 60%–70%; 70%–80%; 80%–90%

Democratic primary results
Party	Candidate	Votes	%
Democratic	Kathryn Boockvar	311,732	50.17%
Democratic	Barbara Behrend Ernsberger	309,680	49.83%
Total votes		621,412	100.0%

=== General election ===
Covey and Boockvar faced each other in the general election. Covey was endorsed in the general election by The Philadelphia Inquirer, which noted her "quasi-judicial experience of having served on the state's labor relations board". Boockvar was endorsed by the Pittsburgh Post-Gazette and The Patriot-News, which both praised her breadth of experience.

2011 Pennsylvania Commonwealth Court election
Party	Candidate	Votes	%
Republican	Anne Covey	968,796	52.10%
Democratic	Kathryn Boockvar	890,831	47.90%
Total votes		1,859,627	100.0%
Republican hold			

== Judicial retention ==
The following judges were up for retention in the 2011 general election:

- Supreme Court judge Michael Eakin
- Superior Court judge John T. Bender
- Superior Court judge Mary Jane Bowes
- Commonwealth Court judge Renée Cohn Jubelirer
- Commonwealth Court judge Robert "Robin" Simpson
- Commonwealth Court judge Mary Hannah Leavitt

The Pennsylvania Bar Association recommended retention of all six judges.

Eakin actively campaigned for retention, raising $526,000—more than any of the four candidates contending for the open seats on the Superior Court and the Commonwealth Court—and airing television advertisements.

In the general election on November 8, voters elected to retain all six judges. All the judges won their retention elections by a wide margin; each of them was favored for retention by over 70% of voters.

=== Supreme Court ===
Justice Michael Eakin (R) Retention, 2011
Choice	Votes	%
For	1,097,368	73.59
Against	393,728	26.41
Total	1,491,096	100.00
Source: PA Department of State

=== Superior Court ===
Judge John T. Bender (R) Retention, 2011
Choice	Votes	%
For	1,041,421	71.86
Against	407,753	28.14
Total	1,449,174	100.00
Source: PA Department of State

Judge Mary Jane Bowes (R) Retention, 2011
Choice	Votes	%
For	1,067,446	73.56
Against	383,594	26.44
Total	1,451,040	100.00
Source: PA Department of State

=== Commonwealth Court ===
Judge Renée Cohn Jubelirer (R) Retention, 2011
Choice	Votes	%
For	1,016,483	70.54
Against	424,532	29.46
Total	1,441,015	100.00
Source: PA Department of State

Judge Mary Hannah Leavitt (R) Retention, 2011
Choice	Votes	%
For	1,029,890	71.93
Against	401,926	28.07
Total	1,431,816	100.00
Source: PA Department of State

Judge Robin Simpson (R) Retention, 2011
Choice	Votes	%
For	1,181,104	75.16
Against	390,395	24.84
Total	1,571,499	100.00
Source: PA Department of State
