= 2027 Allegheny County elections =

2027 Pennsylvania local election

- November 2, 2027

A general election will be held in Allegheny County, Pennsylvania, on November 2, 2027, to elect various county-level positions. Primary elections will be held on May 18.

== County Executive ==
Incumbent Democratic county executive Sara Innamorato is running for re-election.

== County Controller ==
=== Democratic primary ===
==== Candidates ====
===== Publicly expressed interest =====
- Bethany Hallam, at-large county councilmember (2020–present)
- Warner Macklin, financial advisor

===== Potential =====
- Amy Weise, incumbent controller

== County Treasurer ==
=== Democratic primary ===
==== Candidates ====
===== Potential =====
- Erica Rocchi Brusselars, incumbent treasurer

== District Attorney ==
Incumbent Forward Party district attorney Stephen Zappala is eligible to run for re-election.

== County Council ==
Nine of fifteen seats on the Allegheny County Council are up for election.

== Municipal ==
Various municipalities hold elections in 2027, including Pittsburgh.
