= Musmanno =

Musmanno is a surname. Notable people with the surname include:

- John Musmanno (born 1942), American judge
- Michael Musmanno (1897–1968), American jurist, politician, United States Navy admiral, and writer
