= Cheryl Allen =

Cheryl Allen may refer to:

- Cheryl Allen (sprinter) (born 1972), Canadian sprinter
- Cheryl Lynn Allen (born 1947), American judge in Pennsylvania

== See also ==
- Sheryl Allen (born 1943), American politician and educator, member of the Utah House of Representatives
