= Wecht =

Wecht is a surname. Notable people with the surname include:

- Brian Wecht (born 1975), American theoretical physicist, comedian, musician and music producer
- Cyril Wecht (1931–2024), American forensic pathologist
- David Wecht (born 1962), Associate Justice of the Supreme Court of Pennsylvania, U.S.
