= Judith Olson =

Judith Olson may refer to:

- Judith Ference Olson (born 1957), American lawyer and jurist in Pennsylvania
- Judith S. Olson, American researcher in the field of human-computer interaction
