= Commonwealth v. Mochan =

1955 Pennsylvania Supreme Court case

- Court: Superior Court of Pennsylvania
- Full case name: Commonwealth of Pennsylvania v. Michael Mochan.
- Decided: January 14, 1955
- Defendant: Michael Mochan
- Plaintiff: Commonwealth of Pennsylvania
- Citation: 177 Pa. Super. 454, 110 A.2d 788

Holding
- Judgments and sentences affirmed.

Court membership
- Judges sitting: Chester H. Rhodes, Robert E. Woodside, William E. Hirt, Harold L. Ervin, J. Gunther, Wright

Case opinions
- Decision by: William E. Hirt
- Dissent: Robert E. Woodside, J. Gunther

Keywords
- malicious phone calls, common law

Commonwealth v. Mochan 177 Pa. Super. 454 (1955) is a case that addresses conduct not prohibited under statute, but was prohibited under common law.

== Background ==
In early 1953, Michael Mochan used a four party phone line to calls to Louise Zivkovich, a married woman and members of her household around three times a week at different times of the day and night harassing Zivkovich by using obscene language, making lewd comments, soliciting adultery, and suggesting sodomy. The police worked with the phone company to locate and arrest Mochan. Following his arrest Mrs. Zivkovich identified Mochan by recognizing his voice in a phone conversation with him setup with the police.

Mochan was charged with a misdemeanor on two indictment bills for immoral practices and conduct by the district attorney. Mochan tried before a judge Kennedy in the Court of Quarter Sessions of Allegheny County where he was found to be guilty.

Mochan filed an appeal to the Superior Court of Pennsylvania on May 4, 1953 arguing that the conduct charged in the indictments were not criminal offense in this State by any statute, therefore does not constitute a misdemeanor.

== Decision & Dissent ==
The court ruled in favor of the Plaintiff affirming the judgments and sentences. The court states that it was not important that there is no precedent in statues or books, but whether the alleged crimes could be prosecuted and the offenders punished under the common law. The court argues the use of factual charges and indictments to establish the offense as a common law misdemeanor and the victim's testimony to establish guilt. The criminal intent of Mochan was evidenced by a number of overt acts, which negatively affected public morality.

The dissent argues that something cannot be declared a crime that was not previously known to be a crime previously in the Commonwealth. In this case the majority declared anything that any acts that are "potentially" injurious effect on public morality is considered a crime. The division of powers in the Constitution grants the legislature the power to determine what is injurious to public mortality, not the court. The court should not declare what the Mochan did as a crime unless the legislature says it is.
