= Robert E. Colville =

American lawyer (1935–2018)

Robert Colville

Judge of the Pennsylvania Superior Court
- In office March 20, 2006 – January 6, 2010
- Preceded by: Edmund B. Spaeth Jr.
- Succeeded by: Anne Lazarus

Judge of the Allegheny County Court of Common Pleas
- In office January 1, 1998 – March 17, 2006

17th District Attorney of Allegheny County
- In office January 5, 1976 – January 1, 1998
- Preceded by: John Hickton
- Succeeded by: Stephen Zappala

16th Pittsburgh Police Chief
- In office February 10, 1971 – March 1, 1975
- Preceded by: Stephen Joyce
- Succeeded by: Robert Coll

Personal details
- Born: May 23, 1935 Pittsburgh, Pennsylvania, U.S.
- Died: September 11, 2018 (aged 83) Pittsburgh, Pennsylvania, U.S.
- Party: Democratic
- Spouses: Judy Joyce; Janet Graham
- Children: 6, including Robert John
- Education: Duquesne University (BA, JD)
- Profession: Attorney, politician, police officer
- Nickname: Bob

Military service
- Years of service: 1961–1975 (Pittsburgh Police Department)
- Rank: Chief (1971–1975); Homicide Detective (1969–1971); Patrolman (1961–1969)

Robert E. Colville (May 23, 1935 – September 11, 2018) was an American police officer, attorney, and judge from Pittsburgh. Over the course of his career, he served as Pittsburgh Police Chief, as the district attorney of Allegheny County, Pennsylvania, and finally, as a judge on the Allegheny County Court of Common Pleas and the Pennsylvania Superior Court.

== Background ==
Colville was born on May 23, 1935, and grew up in the Manchester section of Pittsburgh. After graduating from North Catholic High School in 1953, Colville joined the United States Marine Corps. He later attended Duquesne University, where he obtained his Bachelor of Arts in 1963. Colville then returned to North Catholic, where he was a teacher, and the school's head football coach. He earned a Juris Doctor degree from Duquesne in 1969.

Colville lived on Pittsburgh's North Side. He had six children: three his first marriage to Judy Joyce, including federal judge Robert J. Colville, and three from his second marriage, to Janet Graham, which lasted until his death.

Colville died from lung cancer at Allegheny General Hospital on September 11, 2018, at the age of 83.

== Police career ==
Colville joined the Pittsburgh Police Department in 1961, and became a homicide detective in 1969. From 1971 through 1975, Colville served as Pittsburgh Chief of Police under Mayor Pete Flaherty. While Chief in 1974 he started the department on testing for promotions.

== Political and legal career ==
He was the Allegheny County District Attorney from 1976, when he defeated incumbent John Hickton, until 1998. Colville contemplated a run for the Pennsylvania Supreme Court in 1981. In 1997, he was elected to the Allegheny County Court of Common Pleas, and in 2006, he was appointed to the Pennsylvania Superior Court.

== See also ==
- Pittsburgh Police
- Allegheny County Sheriff
- Allegheny County Police Department

Legal offices
Preceded by John Hickton	Allegheny County District Attorney; 1976–1998	Succeeded by Stephen Zappala
Preceded by Stephen Joyce	Pittsburgh Police Chief; 1971–1975	Succeeded by Robert Coll
