= Mary Jane Bowes =

American judge

Judge of the Superior Court of Pennsylvania
- Incumbent
- Assumed office January 1, 2002

Personal details
- Born: Pittsburgh, Pennsylvania
- Party: Republican
- Education: Georgetown University; University of Pittsburgh School of Law

Mary Jane Bowes is a judge of the Superior Court of Pennsylvania. She was elected in 2001 and began her term in January 2002.

== Education and legal career ==
Bowes earned a Bachelor of Arts from Georgetown University in 1976 and a Juris Doctor from the University of Pittsburgh School of Law in 1979. After graduating law school, she clerked for Chief Justice Henry X. O'Brien of the Supreme Court of Pennsylvania and Senior Judges Harry Montgomery and John P. Hester of the Superior Court of Pennsylvania.

From 1986 until 1998, she worked in private practice. From 1998 until 2001, she served as corporate counsel to a large environmental remediation firm.

== 2001 Superior Court election ==
In Pennsylvania's 2001 judicial elections, Bowes ran as a Republican for one of three open seats on the Superior Court of Pennsylvania. She was one of four Republicans and three Democrats to run. Despite receiving a rating of "not recommended" from the Pennsylvania Bar Association for lack of trial and appellate advocacy experience, she was endorsed for the Republican nomination by the Pittsburgh Post-Gazette and by the Republican State Committee.

In the primary, Bowes garnered 428,013 votes, or 29.1%, more than any other candidate in the Republican primary race. Along with fellow Republicans Richard B. Klein and John T. Bender, she went on to the general election to face Democrats David Wecht, Lydia Y. Kirkland, and Stephanie Domitrovich.

In the general election, she was again endorsed by the Pittsburgh Post-Gazette. She ultimately received 1,006,251 votes, or 18.7% in the "choose one of six candidates" election, totaling the second most votes. Since she was among the top three candidates, she won a seat on the Superior Court, along with two other Republicans. Analysts attributed the Republican sweep to an off-year low urban turnout, in this state which generally votes Democratic.

== 2011 retention election ==
Her initial ten-year term ending in December 2011, Bowes faced a retention vote in Pennsylvania's 2011 judicial elections. The Pennsylvania Bar Association recommended that voters elect to retain her, citing her work ethic, intellect, community involvement, and clear writing. In the general election on November 8, 2011, Pennsylvanians voted overwhelmingly to retain her.

Retention of Judge Mary Jane Bowes
Candidate	Votes	%
Yes	1,066,543	73.6
No	383,491	26.4
Total votes	1,450,034	100
