= 2023 Allegheny County District Attorney election =

Local election in Pennsylvania

- November 7, 2023
Candidate	Stephen Zappala	Matt Dugan
Party	Republican	Democratic
Popular vote	189,230	178,653
Percentage	51.4%	48.5%
District attorney before election
Stephen Zappala
Democratic
Elected District attorney
Stephen Zappala
Republican

The 2023 Allegheny County District Attorney election was held on November 7, 2023, to elect the district attorney of Allegheny County, Pennsylvania. Incumbent Democratic district attorney Stephen Zappala ran for re-election to a seventh consecutive term but was defeated in the Democratic primary by Matt Dugan, a public defender. Zappala then won the Republican nomination after receiving over 9,000 write-in votes in the primary. He went on to defeat Dugan in the general election, with 51% of the vote.

== Democratic primary ==
Through the primary, Dugan was seen as the more progressive candidate. In his launch, Dugan criticized the rising violent crime in the county, stating that "they've had the opportunity to comment and offer solutions" in previous years.

=== Candidates ===
==== Nominee ====
- Matt Dugan, public defender

==== Eliminated in primary ====
- Stephen Zappala, incumbent district attorney

=== Endorsements ===
Matt Dugan

Local officials

- Ed Gainey, mayor of Pittsburgh (2022–present)

Organizations

- Service Employees International Union Local 668

Political parties

- Allegheny County Democratic Committee

=== Results ===
Democratic primary
Party	Candidate	Votes	%
Democratic	Matt Dugan	94,974	55.62
Democratic	Stephen Zappala (incumbent)	75,575	44.26
Write-in		196	0.11
Total votes		170,745	100.00

== Republican primary ==
No candidate filed to run in the primary, but Zappala won the nomination after receiving over 9,700 write-in votes. He officially accepted the nomination in late June.

=== Results ===
Republican primary
Party	Candidate	Votes	%
	Write-in	11,857	100.00
Total votes		11,857	100.00

== General election ==
=== Endorsements ===
Stephen Zappala (R)

Statewide officials

- Christine Todd Whitman, former governor of New Jersey (1994–2001)

Political parties

- Allegheny County Republican Party
- Forward Party

=== Debate ===
2023 Allegheny County District Attorney debates
No.	Date	Host	Moderator	Link	Democratic	Republican
Key: P Participant A Absent N Not invited I Invited W Withdrawn						
Key: P Participant A Absent N Not invited I Invited W Withdrawn					Dugan	Zappala
1	October 11, 2023	KDKA-TV	Ken Rice	CBS	P	P

=== Results ===
2023 Allegheny County District Attorney election
Party	Candidate	Votes	%
Republican	Stephen Zappala (incumbent)	189,230	51.38
Democratic	Matt Dugan	178,653	48.51
Write-in		380	0.10
Total votes		368,263	100.00
