= Daniel McCaffery =

American judge (born 1964)

Justice of the Pennsylvania Supreme Court
- Incumbent
- Assumed office January 1, 2024
- Preceded by: Max Baer

Judge of the Superior Court of Pennsylvania
- In office January 6, 2020 – January 1, 2024
- Preceded by: Paula Francisco Ott
- Succeeded by: Brandon Neuman

Judge of the Philadelphia Court of Common Pleas
- In office January 6, 2014 – January 6, 2020

Personal details
- Born: July 20, 1964 (age 62) Philadelphia, Pennsylvania, U.S.
- Party: Democratic
- Relatives: Seamus McCaffery (brother)
- Education: Temple University (BA, JD)
- Website: Campaign website

Military service
- Allegiance: United States
- Branch/service: United States Army (1983–1985); United States Army Reserve (1985–1989)
- Rank: Sergeant
- Unit: 1st Cavalry Division

Daniel D. McCaffery (born July 20, 1964) is an American lawyer who serves as a justice of the Pennsylvania Supreme Court since 2024. He is a former judge of the Pennsylvania Superior Court, serving from 2020 to 2024. He defeated Republican Carolyn Carluccio in the 2023 Pennsylvania Supreme Court election, winning with 53% of the vote.

== Military service and education ==
After graduating from Father Judge High School in 1982, McCaffery joined the United States Army and served with the First Cavalry Division in Fort Hood, Texas. He attended the United States Military Academy Preparatory School. After being honorably discharged from active duty, he served three more years in the Army Reserve. He received a Bachelor of Arts in journalism from Temple University in 1988 and a Juris Doctor from Temple University School of Law in 1991.

== Career ==
From 1991 to 1997, McCaffery was an assistant district attorney for Philadelphia County. From 1997 to 2014, he was a shareholder with Friedman, Schuman P.C. From 2014 to 2019, he was a judge of the Philadelphia Court of Common Pleas. In 2019, he was elected to the Superior Court of Pennsylvania.

=== Pennsylvania Supreme Court ===
In November 2022, McCaffery announced his candidacy for a seat on the Pennsylvania Supreme Court left vacant by the death of fellow Democrat Max Baer. He was endorsed by the state Democratic Party in February 2023, and won the May 2023 primary against fellow Superior Court Judge Deborah Kunselman with 60% of the vote. He went on to face the Republican nominee, Montgomery County Court of Common Pleas Judge Carolyn Carluccio, in the general election.

Abortion was the central theme of the general election. Even though candidates in judicial elections typically avoid commenting on specific issues, McCaffery explicitly campaigned on protecting the right to an abortion. Carluccio declined to take a public position on the issue, but did say she would uphold Pennsylvania's law allowing abortion until 24 weeks after conception. However, she was endorsed by the anti-abortion Pennsylvania Pro-Life Federation, and the Pro-Life Coalition of Pennsylvania supported her because she called herself "pro-life".

Over $22 million was spent during the campaign, making the election one of the most expensive Supreme Court elections in the Commonwealth's history. Of that total, McCaffery and his allies spent over $13 million, primarily funded by "the state Democratic Party, labor unions, and associations representing trial attorneys."

On November 7, 2023, he was elected to the Pennsylvania Supreme Court with 53% of the vote; McCaffery's support for abortion rights has been credited as a major factor in his victory.

Legal offices
Preceded by Max Baer	Justice of the Pennsylvania Supreme Court; 2024–present	Incumbent
