= Megan McCarthy King =

American judge (born 1969)

Megan M. King

Judge of the Superior Court of Pennsylvania
- Incumbent
- Assumed office January 6, 2020

Personal details
- Born: December 8, 1969 (age 56)
- Party: Republican
- Education: Vanderbilt University (B.A.); University of Pittsburgh School of Law (J.D.)

Megan McCarthy King (born December 8, 1969) is an American lawyer, professor, and jurist who currently serves as a judge of the Superior Court of Pennsylvania. A member of the Republican Party, King was elected to the Superior Court on November 5, 2019.

== Early life and education ==
Megan McCarthy King was born in 1969, and she grew up in Delaware County, Pennsylvania.

King graduated cum laude from Vanderbilt University in 1992, earning her Bachelor of Arts. She then got accepted into the University of Pittsburgh School of Law, where she received her J.D. degree in 1995.

== Legal career ==
King began her career in 1995 in the Lancaster County District Attorney's Office, where she primarily prosecuted child abuse and elder abuse cases. King eventually became the Assistant District Attorney for Lancaster County.

In 1999, King became a law clerk for Justice Thomas Saylor of the Supreme Court of Pennsylvania. She served as a law clerk until 2001. Not long after her tenure as a Law Clerk, King became a certified special education teacher to better understand and serve the children in her cases.

King later became the Deputy District Attorney for Chester County, where she served in the Child Abuse Unit. She served in this position until she was elected to the Superior Court of Pennsylvania.

== 2019 Superior Court Election ==
Megan won the Republican primary election for the Superior Court of Pennsylvania. With the election being held for 2 seats, the top two candidates in each party's primary proceeded to the general election.

2019 Pennsylvania Superior Court Republican primary results (vote for 2)
Party	Candidate	Votes	%
Republican	Megan McCarthy King	370,084	35.59%
Republican	Christylee Peck	348,271	33.49%
Republican	Rebecca Warren	321,536	30.92%
Total votes		1,039,891	100.0%

Megan then proceeded to the general election for the Pennsylvania Superior Court, where she received 25.41% (1,252,065) of votes, therefore winning alongside Daniel McCaffery.

2019 Pennsylvania Superior Court election (vote for 2)
Party	Candidate	Votes	%
Democratic	Daniel McCaffery	1,273,658	25.85%
Republican	Megan McCarthy King	1,252,065	25.41%
Democratic	Amanda Green-Hawkins	1,235,827	25.08%
Republican	Christylee Peck	1,166,201	23.67%
Total votes		4,927,751	100.0%
Democratic hold			
Republican hold			
