= Mary P. Murray =

Judge on the Superior Court of Pennsylvania

- Incumbent
- Assumed office January 1, 2018

Judge of the Superior Court of Pennsylvania

Personal details
- Born: July 6, 1970 (age 56)
- Party: Republican
- Education: Duquesne University (B.A.) (B.S.); Duquesne University School of Law (J.D.)

Mary P. Murray (born July 6, 1970) is an American lawyer and jurist who currently serves as a judge of the Superior Court of Pennsylvania. A member of the Republican Party, Murray was elected to the Superior Court on November 7, 2017.

== Early life and education ==
Mary P. Murray was born in 1970 in Pennsylvania.

Murray graduated from Duquesne University in 1992 with a B.A./B.S. in marketing, having also minored in psychology. She then went on to study at the Duquesne University School of Law, earning her MBA degree in 1995, and her J.D. degree in 1996.

== Legal career ==
From 2004 to 2017, Murray served as a Magisterial District Judge for Coraopolis, Crescent, Moon, and Neville Township in Allegheny County, Pennsylvania. She heard tens of thousands of civil, criminal, and traffic cases during her tenure - which ended once she was elected to the Superior Court.

== 2017 Superior Court Election ==
Murray got fourth place in the Republican Primary election for the Superior Court. There were four seats open on the Superior Court at the time, meaning each party was able to elect four candidates, therefore allowing Murray to go through to the general elections.

Murray was the only Republican who was elected in the 2017 Superior Court Election, the other three being Democrats.
