= John P. Flaherty Jr. =

American judge (1931–2019)

Chief Justice of the Supreme Court of Pennsylvania
- In office 1996 – December 31, 2001
- Preceded by: Robert N. C. Nix Jr.
- Succeeded by: Ralph Cappy

Justice of the Supreme Court of Pennsylvania
- In office June 15, 1979 – December 31, 2001
- Appointed by: Dick Thornburgh
- Preceded by: Thomas Pomeroy
- Succeeded by: Michael Eakin

Personal details
- Born: November 19, 1931 Pittsburgh, Pennsylvania
- Died: February 20, 2019 (aged 87)
- Party: Democratic

John Paul Flaherty Jr. (November 19, 1931 – February 20, 2019) was a justice of the Supreme Court of Pennsylvania from 1978 to 2001 and chief justice of the Court from 1996 to 2001. He retired at the end of 2001. His seat as Justice was filled by Michael Eakin.

In a highly controversial case while a trial judge, Judge Flaherty's November 16, 1978 findings on Paul Aitkenhead v. Borough of West View, No. GD-4585-78 in part state: "Over the course of five months, the court held periodic hearings, which consisted of extensive expert testimony from as far away as England. At issue was the most recent time-trend study of Dr. Burk and Dr. Yiamouyiannis, which compared cancer mortality in ten cities which fluoridated their water systems with ten cities which did not fluoridate over a period of twenty-eight years from 1940 to 1968. The study concluded that there was a significant increase in cancer mortality in the fluoridated cities."

Judge Flaherty remained convinced that fluoridation is a dangerous practice based on the scientific evidence and moreover that those who belittle opponents of fluoridation do the public a disservice. He agreed that fluoridation is a legislative and regulatory matter under U.S. laws that govern the practice.
