= Maureen Lally-Green =

American lawyer

Judge of the Superior Court of Pennsylvania
- In office June 4, 1998 – July 31, 2009
- Appointed by: Tom Ridge
- Succeeded by: Paula Ott

Personal details
- Born: July 5, 1949 (age 75); Sharpsville, Pennsylvania, U.S.
- Political party: Republican
- Education: Duquesne University (BS); Duquesne University (JD)

Maureen Ellen Lally-Green (born July 5, 1949) is an American lawyer in the state of Pennsylvania. She served as a judge on the Pennsylvania Superior Court.

== Personal ==
Lally-Green was born in Sharpsville, Mercer County, in 1949. She graduated from Duquesne University with a B.S. in 1971 and its School of Law in 1974.

Lally-Green practiced law in a private law firm in Pittsburgh. She later served as counsel to Commodity Futures Trading Commission in Washington, D.C., as counsel to the former Westinghouse Electric Corporation, and as a consultant to Justices of the Pennsylvania Supreme Court. She was a professor at Duquesne University School of Law, and was the Dean of the Law School

== Judicial career ==
In 1998, Lally-Green was appointed by Governor Tom Ridge to the Superior Court of Pennsylvania and confirmed by the State Senate. The next year, Judge Lally-Green was elected for a full ten-year term.

Lally-Green ran for a seat on the Pennsylvania Supreme Court in 2007. During the campaign, a Virginia organization called the Center for Individual Freedom ran over $1.2 million worth of ads on her behalf. The organization had not registered with the state nor did it file campaign reports. The campaign led to efforts by state officials to determine the origin of the cash. However, the source was never determined.

Lally-Green finished third in the race behind Seamus McCaffery and Debra Todd, two colleagues on the Superior Court.
