= Robert Coll =

American police chief in Pittsburgh (born 1934)

Robert J. Coll
- Police career
- Department: Pittsburgh Police
- Service years: 1960–1986 (Pittsburgh Police)
- Rank: Pittsburgh Chief; March 1, 1975-; April 4, 1986

Robert J. Coll (born 1934) was a longtime Pittsburgh Police leader, who served as Pittsburgh Police Chief from March 1, 1975 – April 4, 1986. He first joined the force in 1960. In the last year of his tenure as Chief the Pittsburgh Police boasted 1,200 sworn officers.

In 1977, Chief Coll made headlines while attending a community meeting with the comment that the then state law prohibited him from reprimanding officers with suspensions or dismissals.

Chief Coll on being a cop

I don't think flair ever solved a crime. You can employ all the technological advances, you can read all of the books and all the brochures, but key to being a police officer is, and will always be, underststanding people.

— A 1987 Pittsburgh Post-Gazette interview.

In February, 1981 a long simmering political feud erupted during a Pittsburgh City Council meeting at City Hall between Chief Coll and longtime councilmember and sometimes council president Eugene "Jeep" DePasquale, with accusations of lying and shouting. Coll was the last chief before Mayor Caliguri's summer 1986 police reorganization that put the nine long time city police precincts under the current five "police zones" format.

After his retirement he became Director of the Allegheny County Police Training Academy in suburban North Park. A position he assumed in January, 1987.

== See also ==
- Pittsburgh
- Police chief
- Allegheny County Sheriff
- List of law enforcement agencies in Pennsylvania

Legal offices
Preceded by Robert E. Colville	Pittsburgh Police Chief; 1975–1986	Succeeded by William Ward
