= Michael T. Joyce =

American judge

Judge of the Pennsylvania Superior Court
- In office January 4, 1998 – December 31, 2007
- Succeeded by: Cheryl Lynn Allen

Personal details
- Born: February 24, 1949 (age 77) Pittsburgh, Pennsylvania
- Party: Republican
- Spouse: Joanne Joyce
- Children: 2
- Education: Penn State University; Franklin Pierce Law Center

Michael T. Joyce is a former Judge of the Pennsylvania Superior Court.

== Biography ==
Joyce served in the U.S. Army from 1967 to 1970. He attended the Army Intelligence School and the Defense Language Institute, where he learned three main dialects of the Vietnamese language before serving 13 months in Vietnam with the 25th Infantry Division. He was awarded the Bronze Star and two Army Commendation Medals and was promoted to the rank of Staff Sergeant.

Upon his return, Joyce attend Pennsylvania State University and graduated in 1973. He received a law degree from Franklin Pierce Law Center in 1977 and served as a Presidential Law Clerk in the Ford White House in 1975. He maintained a private practice from 1977 to 1985 before being elected judge for the Erie County Court of Common Pleas in July 1985. He was retained for an additional term in November 1995. He was elected judge of the Pennsylvania Superior Court in 1997.

In the fall of 2008, Joyce was convicted of two felony counts of mail fraud and six felony counts of money laundering. In 2010, the conviction was upheld on appeal and Joyce was sentenced to 46 months in federal prison.

In October, 2011, it was announced that Joyce is now suing Erie Insurance and State Farm, claiming the companies defrauded him.

Joyce was released from prison in August 2012.
