= Stephen A. Joyce =

American police chief

- Police career
- Department: Pittsburgh Police
- Service years: ?-1971 (Pittsburgh Police)
- Rank: Chief; January 5, 1970-; February 10, 1971

Stephen A. Joyce was a longtime Pittsburgh Police leader, who served as Pittsburgh Police Chief from January 5, 1970 – February 10, 1971.

== See also ==
- Police chief
- Allegheny County Sheriff
- List of law enforcement agencies in Pennsylvania

Legal offices
| Preceded by James Slusser | Pittsburgh Police Chief; 1970-1971 | Succeeded by Robert E. Colville |
