= James Slusser =

American police officer (1916–1996)

James W. Slusser
- Born: August 30, 1916; Pittsburgh, Pennsylvania, U.S.
- Died: June 6, 1996 (aged 79); Pittsburgh, Pennsylvania, U.S.
- Police career
- Department: Pittsburgh Police
- Service years: 1941–1970 (Pittsburgh Police)
- Rank: Chief; August 13, 1952 – January 5, 1970

James Slusser (August 30, 1916 – June 6, 1996) was an American police officer. He was a longtime Pittsburgh police leader who served as Pittsburgh Police Chief from August 13, 1952 – January 5, 1970. He joined the force in 1941.

After retiring, Slusser became the first director of the Allegheny County Police Training Academy at suburban North Park from 1971 until at least early 1975.

== See also ==
- Police chief
- Allegheny County Sheriff
- List of law enforcement agencies in Pennsylvania

Legal offices
Preceded by Henry Pieper	Pittsburgh Police Chief; 1952-1970	Succeeded by Stephen A. Joyce
