= Dan Pellegrini =

American lawyer

Senior Judge of the Pennsylvania Superior Court
- In office January 2, 2019 – January 1, 2024

Judge of the Pennsylvania Commonwealth Court
- In office January 2, 1990 – December 31, 2015
- Succeeded by: Michael Wojcik

Personal details
- Born: September 15, 1945 (age 80)
- Party: Democratic

Military service
- Allegiance: United States
- Branch/service: U.S. Army
- Years of service: 1971-73
- Rank: 1st Lieutenant

Dante Robert Pellegrini (born September 15, 1945) is a senior judge of the Pennsylvania Commonwealth Court. He served as president judge from 2012 to 2015, when he took senior status upon reaching the mandatory retirement age of 70.

== Biography ==
Pellegrini attended Duquesne University and the Duquesne University School of Law. He was an assistant solicitor for the City of Pittsburgh Law Department in 1973, first assistant city solicitor in 1977, and deputy city solicitor in 1978.

He was city solicitor of Pittsburgh from 1982 to 1989. He was elected to be a judge of the Commonwealth Court of Pennsylvania in 1989.

== Ruling on Same-Sex Marriage Licenses in Pennsylvania ==
On September 12, 2013, Pellegrini issued an order to cease the issuance of marriage licenses to same-sex couples in Pennsylvania, specifically in Montgomery County by D. Bruce Hanes, Clerk of the Orphans' Court.

Unless and until either the General Assembly repeals or suspends the Marriage Law provisions or a court of competent jurisdiction orders that the law is not to be obeyed or enforced, the Marriage Law in its entirety is to be obeyed and enforced by all Commonwealth public officials.
