= 2005 Pennsylvania elections =

- November 8, 2005

Elections were held in Pennsylvania on November 8, 2005. Primary elections for various state offices were held on May 17, 2005.

== Judicial retention ==
=== Supreme Court ===
Justice Sandra Schultz Newman (R) retention, 2005
Choice	Votes	%
For	797,465	54.09
Against	676,848	45.91
Total	1,474,313	100.00
Source: PA Department of State

Justice Russell M. Nigro (D) retention, 2005
Choice	Votes	%
For	706,251	48.97
Against	736,036	51.03
Total	1,442,287	100.00
Source: PA Department of State
