= Deborah A. Kunselman =

American judge (born 1967)

Judge of the Superior Court of Pennsylvania
- Incumbent
- Assumed office January 1, 2018

Personal details
- Born: September 24, 1967 (age 59) Wiesbaden, Germany
- Party: Democratic
- Education: Penn State University (B.A.); University of Notre Dame School of Law (J.D.)

Deborah Anne Kunselman (born September 24, 1967, in Wiesbaden, Germany) is an American lawyer and jurist who currently serves as a judge of the Superior Court of Pennsylvania. She was first elected on November 7, 2017, and her ten-year term began January 1, 2018. She ran for a seat on the Pennsylvania Supreme Court in 2023 but lost in the Democratic primary.

== Education and legal career ==
Kunselman was born 1967 on a US military base in Wiesbaden, Germany. She attended Penn State University, spending a semester abroad at Kiel University and obtaining her Bachelor of Arts degree in 1989. She then attended University of Notre Dame School of Law, where she graduated with a Juris Doctor in 1992. Kunselman started her career with the Babst Calland law firm and eventually became a Beaver County solicitor in 1998. In 2006, she became a judge of the Beaver County Court of Common Pleas, where she served until her election to the state Superior Court.
