= Sallie Updyke Mundy =

American judge (born 1962)

Sallie Mundy

Justice of the Pennsylvania Supreme Court
- Incumbent
- Assumed office July 21, 2016
- Appointed by: Tom Wolf
- Preceded by: J. Michael Eakin

Personal details
- Born: June 29, 1962 (age 64) Elmira, New York, U.S.
- Party: Republican
- Spouse(s): Tim Stone (divorced); James Mundy (divorced)
- Education: Washington and Jefferson College (BA); University of Pittsburgh (JD)

Sallie Updyke Mundy (born June 29, 1962) is a justice of the Pennsylvania Supreme Court and a former judge of the Pennsylvania Superior Court.

== Early life and education ==
Mundy was born in Elmira, New York and was raised in Tioga, Pennsylvania. She graduated with a Bachelor of Arts from Washington & Jefferson College in 1984. She graduated with a Juris Doctor from University of Pittsburgh School of Law in 1987.

== Legal career ==
From 1987 to 1988, Mundy served as a law clerk to the Honorable Robert M. Kemp, President Judge of the Tioga County Courts of Common Pleas. In 1988, she entered private practice, working as a defense attorney in the field of medical malpractice.

Employed as an attorney with the firm of McQuade Blasko in State College, Pennsylvania from 1988 to 1995, she briefly worked as an attorney for the law offices of Stephen Ryan in Bala Cynwyd from 1995 to 1996 and Swartz Campbell & Detweiler in Philadelphia from 1996 to 1998 before securing her position as an attorney with the Philadelphia law firm, McEldrew & Fullam, where she worked from 1998 to 2009.

A past chair of the Disciplinary Hearing Committee, on which she served as a member from 1995 to 2001, Mundy was also a member of the board of directors of the Pennsylvania Interest on Lawyer Trust Accounts (IOLTA) from 1997 to 2003.

From 2008 to 2009, she served as a volunteer public defender.

== Judicial career ==
From 2010 to 2016, Mundy served as a judge with the Superior Court of Pennsylvania. In 2014, she participated with two of her superior court colleagues, Judge Cheryl Lynn Allen and Judge Christine L. Donohue, in a special argument session hosted by the Pennsylvania State University's Dickinson School of Law at University Park from April 1 to 2. The special outreach session was designed to help educate high school, college students and members of the general public about the operations of Pennsylvania's superior court system, and gave attendees the opportunity to witness more than thirty cases related to civil, criminal, and family law.

=== Pennsylvania Supreme Court ===
Mundy was appointed by Pennsylvania Governor Tom Wolf to the seat vacated by Justice J. Michael Eakin on the Pennsylvania Supreme Court and confirmed on June 27, 2016. On November 8, 2017, Justice Mundy defeated Court of Common Pleas Judge Dwayne Woodruff, a former Pittsburgh Steelers defensive back, to gain a ten-year term on the Pennsylvania Supreme Court.

== Awards and honors ==
Mundy has been recognized for her professional and public service activities by multiple organizations, including:

- The Legal Intelligencer’s award for Top Women in Law, 2016
- Washington & Jefferson College's W. Edward Sell ’45 Legal Achievement Award, 2016

== Memberships and other associations ==
Mundy has been a member of the following organizations:

- National Association of Women Judges
- Pennsylvania, Philadelphia and Tioga Bar Associations
- Pennsylvania Bar Association Insurance Trust (trustee, 1997-2008)
- Pennsylvania Bar Association House of Delegates (member, 1996-2008)
- Pennsylvania Bar Young Lawyer’s Division Zone 11 (chair, 1993-95; at-large chair, 1995-96)
- Pennsylvania Bar Association Commission on Women in the Profession
- Pennsylvania Bar Foundation Commonwealth Club

== Personal life ==
She is part-owner of a small cattle farm, raising Scottish Highland cattle, in Tioga County.

Legal offices
Preceded by J. Michael Eakin	Justice of the Supreme Court of Pennsylvania; 2016–present	Incumbent
