= Jane Cutler Greenspan =

American judge (born 1948)

Justice of the Pennsylvania Supreme Court
- In office July 2, 2008 – January 4, 2010
- Appointed by: Ed Rendell
- Preceded by: Ralph Cappy
- Succeeded by: Joan Orie Melvin

Personal details
- Born: 1948 (age 76–77)
- Political party: Democratic
- Education: Smith College (BA); Rutgers University (JD)

Jane Cutler Greenspan was a justice of the Supreme Court of Pennsylvania.

She was born in 1948. Greenspan earned her bachelor's degree at Smith College (1970) and Juris Doctor at Rutgers University School of Law, Camden (1973). She served as a law clerk for Robert N. C. Nix Jr. before becoming an assistant district attorney in Philadelphia, Pennsylvania. Greenspan served as a judge of the Pennsylvania Court of Common Pleas from 1987 to 2008. She was then appointed as a justice of the Supreme Court of Pennsylvania on July 2, 2008, following the resignation of Ralph Cappy. Greenspan resigned from the bench in December 2009.

== See also ==
- Supreme Court of Pennsylvania
- List of justices of the Supreme Court of Pennsylvania

Political offices
Preceded by Ralph Cappy	Justice of the Supreme Court of Pennsylvania; 2008–2009	Succeeded by
