= John Musmanno =

American lawyer

John L. Musmanno

Judge of the Superior Court of Pennsylvania
- In office January 4, 1998 – December 31, 2012
- Succeeded by: Victor P. Stabile

Personal details
- Born: March 31, 1942 (age 84) Stowe Township, Pennsylvania
- Party: Democratic
- Spouse: Virginia (Farina) Musmann
- Education: Washington & Jefferson College; Vanderbilt University Law School

John L. Musmanno is a senior judge of the Pennsylvania Superior Court.

== Formative years ==
Musmanno was born in Stowe Township, Pennsylvania. He graduated from Washington & Jefferson College in 1963, where he was a member of Phi Beta Kappa and won the Henry Wilson Temple History Prize. He graduated from Vanderbilt University Law School in 1966, where he was an assistant editor of the Vanderbilt Law Review.

== Legal and public service career ==
Between the years 1966 and 1981, he was in private practice. He was elected district justice in 1970, serving until he was elected to the Allegheny County Court of Common Pleas in 1981. He was elected to the Pennsylvania Superior Court in 1997. During the campaign, the Pittsburgh Post-Gazette profiled a number of Allegheny County judges who were neglecting their judicial duties while running for higher office, but singled Musmanno out as a judge who maintained a full case load during the campaign.

He won retention in 2007. During the election, the Pennsylvania Bar Association endorsed him, describing him as "highly regarded for his intelligence, courteousness, fairness, judicial temperament and professionalism."

He is a member of the Democratic Party.

In 2008, he was awarded the W. Edward Sell Achievement in Law Award from Washington & Jefferson College.

He took senior status in late December 2012/early January 2013.

== See also ==
- Michael Musmanno
