= Stephen Zappala Sr. =

American judge (1932–2021)

Stephen A. Zappala Sr. (September 26, 1932 – May 21, 2021) was a Pennsylvania Supreme Court Chief Justice.

== Family ==
Zappala is the son of Josephine (Andalona) Zappala and Frank Joseph Zappala.

Frank Zappala was an Italian immigrant who came to America in the early 1900s with both his parents, Carmella and Joseph Zappala, and Frank's other siblings. They all originally lived in New York City, in the Bronx, on Mott Street. Slowly the whole family relocated to Pennsylvania. The Zappalas like many of the early Italian immigrants had little to no education, but Frank Zappala finished both college and then the University of Pittsburgh Law school. He later became a magistrate and state legislator.

Zappala was the father of Stephen A. Zappala Jr., a Democratic politician and District Attorney of Allegheny County, Pennsylvania.

== Career ==
Zappala served as the director of the Allegheny County Authority for Improvement of Municipalities in the early 1970s, and was appointed solicitor of Carnegie Borough in February 1972.

In January 1980, Zappala joined the Allegheny County Court of Common Pleas.

Zappala joined the Pennsylvania Supreme Court on January 3, 1983. He assumed the position of chief justice on January 1, 2002.
