= Jacqueline Shogan =

Pennsylvania Supreme Court Judge

Jacqueline O. Shogan

Judge of the Superior Court of Pennsylvania
- In office January 7, 2008 – 2021
- Preceded by: Robert C. Daniels
- Succeeded by: Jill Beck

Personal details
- Born: June 5, 1953 (age 72) New York City, New York, U.S.
- Party: Republican
- Education: University of Virginia; Duke University

Jacqueline Ouzts Shogan (born June 5, 1953) was a judge of the Superior Court of Pennsylvania. She was first elected in 2007 and then re-elected in 2017.

== Education and legal career ==
Jacqueline was born in Flushing, Queens, New York City. She attended University of Virginia where she graduated in 1981 with master's degree in nursing. After some years she decided to attend a law school where she attended Duke University School of Law in Durham, North Carolina and enrolled for a JD program, she graduated in 1990. Shogan began her career as a law clerk at the United States District Court for The Western District of Pennsylvania between 1997 and 2001. In 2002, she began working at Thorp Reed & Armstrong LLP, a consulting firm in Pennsylvania as an attorney.

In 2008, Shogan was appointed Judge of the Monroeville Pennsylvania Superior Court. After the end of her ten-year term, Judge Shogan filed to stand for retention by voters in 2017. She was retained and her term was scheduled to end in 2028. In 2021, Shogan retired from the bench.
