= 2027 Pittsburgh municipal election =

2027 Pennsylvania local election

2027 Pittsburgh elections
- November 2, 2027

A general election will be held in Pittsburgh, Pennsylvania on November 2, 2027, to elect various city-level positions. Primary elections will be held on May 18.

== City Controller ==
=== Democratic primary ===
==== Candidates ====
===== Potential =====
- Rachael Heisler, incumbent controller

== City Council ==
Five seats on the Pittsburgh City Council are up for election.

=== District 1 ===
==== Democratic primary ====
===== Candidates =====
====== Declared ======
- Bobby Wilson, incumbent councilmember

=== District 3 ===
==== Democratic primary ====
===== Candidates =====
====== Potential ======
- Bob Charland, incumbent councilmember

=== District 5 ===
==== Democratic primary ====
===== Candidates =====
====== Declared ======
- Scott McMurtry, former council aide
- Barb Warwick, incumbent councilmember

=== District 7 ===
==== Democratic primary ====
===== Candidates =====
====== Potential ======
- Jordan Botta, Allegheny County councilmember from the 13th district (2025–present)

====== Declined ======
- Deb Gross, incumbent councilmember

=== District 9 ===
==== Democratic primary ====
===== Candidates =====
====== Potential ======
- Khari Mosley, incumbent councilmember

== School Board ==
Four seats on the school board are up for election.
