= Department of Human Services =

Agency responsible for providing public assistance

A Department of Human Services (DHS) or Ministry of Human Services (MHS) is a national or subnational umbrella agency which is responsible for providing public assistance programs to the population they serve. Various aspects or alternate names include social security, social affairs, human resources and welfare.

A social affairs department is often combined with the portfolio of health or labor.

== Examples ==
Some examples include:

- Albania — Ministry of Labor, Social Affairs and Equal Opportunities
- Australia — Services Australia
  - — Department of Human Services (South Australia)
- Canada — Human Resources and Skills Development Canada
  - Ontario — Ministry of Community and Social Services
- Colombia — Ministry of Social Protection (Colombia)
- Croatia — Ministry of Health and Social Welfare and Ministry of the Family, Veterans' Affairs and Intergenerational Solidarity
- Denmark — Ministry of Social Affairs
- Guyana — Ministry of Labour Human Services and Social Security
- Iceland — Ministry of Welfare
- India — Ministry of Tribal Affairs
- Indonesia – Ministry of Social Affairs
- (Republic of Ireland) Ireland — Department of Social Protection
- Japan — Ministry of Health, Labour and Welfare
- Lebanon — Ministry of Social Affairs
- Netherlands — Ministry of Social Affairs and Employment
- New Zealand — Ministry of Social Development
- People's Republic of China — Ministry of Human Resources and Social Security
  - Hong Kong — Labour and Welfare Bureau
- Philippines — Department of Social Welfare and Development
- Portugal — Ministry of Labour and Social Solidarity
- (Russia) Russian Federation — Ministry of Labour and Social Protection
- Saint Lucia — Ministry of Health, Human Services, Family Affairs & Gender Relations
- Sweden — Ministry of Health and Social Affairs
- United Kingdom — Department for Work and Pensions
  - Northern Ireland — Department of Health, Social Services and Public Safety
- United States — United States Department of Health and Human Services
  - Hawaii — Hawaii Department of Human Services
  - Illinois — Illinois Department of Human Services
  - Michigan — Michigan Department of Human Services
  - North Carolina — North Carolina Department of Health and Human Services
  - Oklahoma — Oklahoma Department of Human Services
  - Oregon — Oregon Department of Human Services
  - Pennsylvania — Pennsylvania Department of Human Services
  - Vermont — Vermont Agency of Human Services
