= Ralph Cappy =

American judge

Ralph J. Cappy

Chief Justice of the Supreme Court of Pennsylvania
- In office 2003 – January 6, 2008
- Preceded by: John P. Flaherty Jr.
- Succeeded by: Ronald D. Castille

Justice of the Supreme Court of Pennsylvania
- In office January 1, 1990 – January 6, 2008
- Succeeded by: Jane Cutler Greenspan

Personal details
- Born: August 25, 1943
- Died: May 1, 2009 (aged 65) Green Tree, Pennsylvania, U.S.
- Party: Democratic
- Spouse: Janet Cappy
- Education: University of Pittsburgh; University of Pittsburgh School of Law

Ralph Joseph Cappy (August 25, 1943 – May 1, 2009) was a justice of the Supreme Court of Pennsylvania from 1990 to 1998 and chief justice of the Court from 2003 to 2008.

Prior to joining the state Supreme Court, Cappy was named to the Allegheny County Court of Common Pleas in 1978 and served as administrative judge of the civil division from 1986 to 1990. After leaving the Court in January 2008, he joined the law firm of Buchanan, Ingersoll & Rooney and practiced commercial litigation. He also served as chairman of the board of trustees at his alma mater the University of Pittsburgh.

Cappy died at his Green Tree home on May 1, 2009, at age 65.

== See also ==
- 2005 Pennsylvania General Assembly pay raise controversy
