= Michael Eakin =

American judge

J. Michael Eakin

Justice of the Pennsylvania Supreme Court
- In office January 6, 2002 – March 15, 2016
- Preceded by: John P. Flaherty Jr.
- Succeeded by: Sallie Updyke Mundy

Judge of the Superior Court of Pennsylvania
- In office December 14, 1995 – January 6, 2002

Personal details
- Born: November 18, 1948 (age 77) Mechanicsburg, Pennsylvania, U.S.
- Died: May 27, 2025 Hershey, Pennsylvania, U.S.
- Party: Republican
- Education: Franklin & Marshall College (BA); Penn State Dickinson Law (JD)

J. Michael Eakin (born November 18, 1948) is an American lawyer, who served as a justice of the Supreme Court of the Commonwealth of Pennsylvania. He was elected to the State's Supreme Court in 2001 as a Republican. In November 2011, Justice Eakin won judicial retention in a statewide election for his second 10-year term with 73.6% of the popular vote. In response to an ethics investigation, he made his resignation public on March 15, 2016.

== Early life and career ==
Justice Eakin was born in Mechanicsburg, Pennsylvania in 1948. He graduated from Franklin and Marshall College in 1970 with a Bachelor of Arts (BA) in Government and obtained his Juris Doctor (JD) degree from The Dickinson School of Law in 1975. In 2005 he was awarded an honorary Doctorate of Laws from Widener University in Chester, Pennsylvania. He served in Pennsylvania's Army National Guard, 28th Division, from 1971 to 1977. After graduating from law school in 1975 and until 1983, he served as an Assistant District Attorney for Cumberland County, Pennsylvania. In 1984 he became the District Attorney for Cumberland County, PA, a position he held until 1995 when he was elected as a Judge for the Superior Court of Pennsylvania. This is a position he held until 2001 when he was elected to a 10-year term on the state's Supreme Court. He is currently married to Heidi Eakin and has three sons, Michael, Zachary and Chase.

In 2001, he was named runner up "Politician of the Year" by PoliticsPA.

== Rhyming opinions ==
Justice Eakin is better known in legal circles for the unorthodox way he pens his opinions. He enjoys writing his opinions in poetic verse when as he has stated, "The subject of the case (…) call[s] for a little grin here or there." For this, he has joined a long list of Justices and Judges who have been heavily criticized for bringing literary insight into what has traditionally been considered as boring and straight forward judicial decision making.

An example of the types of judicial lyricism that Justice Eakin is known for is this rhyme he wrote regarding a premarital contract gone wrong:

Conrad Busch filed a timely appeal,
Trying to avoid a premarital deal
Which says appellee need not pay him support,
He brings his case, properly, before this Court.

They wanted to marry, their lives to enhance,
Not for the dollars--it was for romance.
When they said "I do," had their wedding day kiss,
It was not about money--only marital bliss.

But a deal's a deal, if fairly undertaken,
And we find disclosure was fair and unshaken.
Appellant may shun that made once upon a time,
But his appeal must fail, lacking reason (if not rhyme).

— Busch v. Busch, 732 A.2d 1274, 1275, 1278 (Pa. Super. Ct. 1999)

Another example of his verse would be this rhyme he wrote regarding a contract dispute:

The emu's a bird quite large and stately,
Whose market potential was valued so greatly
That a decade ago, it was thought to be
The boom crop of the 21st century.

Our appellant decided she ought to invest
In two breeding emus, but their conjugal nest
Produced no chicks, so she tried to regain
Her purchase money, but alas in vain.

Appellant then filed a contract suit,
But the verdict gave her claim the boot;
Thus she was left with no resort
But this appeal to the Superior Court.

— Liddle v. Scholze, 768 A.2d 1183 (Pa. Super. Ct. 2001)

Perhaps his most currently commented opinion is his dissent on Noel v. Travis, where he disagreed with the majority who found that the appellant was in fact not guilty of a DUI after being found riding his horse while intoxicated. Justice Eakin wrote (in part):

A horse is a horse, of course, of course,
And no one can talk to a horse of course
That is, of course, unless the horse is the famous Mr. Ed.

Go right to the source and ask the horse
He'll give you the answer that you'll endorse.
He's always on a steady course. Talk to Mr. Ed.
[***]
A horse is a horse, of course, of course,
but the Vehicle Code does not divorce
its application from, perforce,
a steed, as my colleagues said.

"It's not vague" I'll say until I'm hoarse,
and whether a car, a truck or horse
this law applies with equal force,
and I'd reverse instead.
Because I cannot agree this statute is vague or ambiguous, I respectfully dissent.

— Noel v. Travis, 857 A.2d 1283, 1289 (Pa. 2004)

Due to the unorthodox way Justice Eakin pens his opinions, he has been criticized by his fellow Justices. In the 2002 New York Times article "Justices Call on Bench's Bard to Limit his Lyricism", Chief Justice Stephen A. Zappala was quoted as writing that "An opinion that expresses itself in rhyme reflects poorly on the Supreme Court of Pennsylvania." Justice Ralph J. Cappy was also quoted as stating that "Every jurist has the right to express him or herself in a manner the jurist deems appropriate, [but I am concerned about] the perception that litigants and the public at large might form when an opinion of the court is reduced to rhyme." However, Justice Eakin has justified his so-called "poetic justice" by stating that "[Y]ou have an obligation as a judge to be right, but you have no obligation to be dull."

== Presentations ==
On July 7, 2007, Justice Eakin and Attorney Matthew A. Cartwright, of Munley, Munley and Cartwright, presented "Ethics Issues for Trial Lawyers" to the Pennsylvania Trial Lawyers Annual Convention in Hershey, Pennsylvania.

On March 23, 2015, Justice Eakin gave a presentation entitled "The Piano Man as Judge, Juror and Prosecutor" as part of the Touro College of Law conference, "Billy Joel & The Law."

== Controversy ==
In 2015, racist and misogynist emails Eakin received have been released by Kathleen Kane in her dispute with the judicial system. Only four emails were forwarded by Eakin. They were examined by the Judicial Conduct Board.

Justice Eakin resigned on March 15, 2016.
