= Stephen Zappala =

Pennsylvania district attorney

District Attorney of Allegheny County
- Incumbent
- Assumed office January 2, 1998
- Preceded by: Robert E. Colville

Personal details
- Born: 1957 (age 68–69)
- Party: Forward (2023–present)
- Other political affiliations: Republican (2023); Democratic (before 2023)
- Spouse: Mary
- Children: 4
- Relatives: Stephen Zappala Sr. (father); Frank J. Zappala (grandfather)
- Education: University of Pittsburgh (BA); Duquesne University (JD)

Stephen A. Zappala Jr. is an American lawyer who is the current District Attorney of Allegheny County, Pennsylvania.

== Family ==
Zappala is the son of Phyllis Zappala (née Koleno) and Stephen Zappala Sr., a former Justice of the Pennsylvania Supreme Court, and grandson of Frank J. Zappala, a Pennsylvania attorney, magistrate and legislator.

== Education ==
After graduating from Central Catholic High School in Pittsburgh, Zappala began his undergraduate studies at the University of Delaware, where he played linebacker. After a back injury sidelined him, he transferred to the University of Pittsburgh, where he graduated with a degree in political science. He earned his J.D. from Duquesne University School of Law.

== Career ==
Upon graduation from law school, he joined the Pittsburgh law firms of Grogan, Graffam, McGinley & Lucchino and Dattilo, Barry, Fasulo & Cambest as an associate. In 1990, he became a partner at Brucker, Zappala, Schneider & Porter, another Pittsburgh law firm. In 1995, he was named Chairman of the Allegheny County Board of Viewers.

In December 1997, District Attorney Robert E. Colville announced he was leaving the position to become judge on the Court of Common Pleas. Zappala was appointed by the Allegheny County's Common Pleas judges with 22 votes. His primary rival for the position, W. Christopher Conrad, received 6 votes. Shortly after his 1998 swearing-in as district attorney, Zappala fired Conrad, who had been working in the district attorney's office as lead homicide prosecutor.

Zappala defeated Conrad again in the 1999 Democratic primary election for the district attorney position, with 63% of the vote. However, Conrad successfully pursued write-in votes on the Republican ballot, which led to Zappala facing Conrad again in the general election in November 1999. Zappala won handily.

In 2004, County Coroner Cyril Wecht criticized Zappala for blocking him from holding inquests in certain cases. Wecht accused Zappala of "impudence, arrogance, gall of an unmitigated nature, hubris and unsurpassed chutzpah that absolutely defies explanation". When Wecht was later indicted on a variety of charges, a defense attorney blamed Zappala for the probe, saying it was politically motivated.

In 2012, when Maddox Derkosh was killed by African wild dogs after falling into their exhibit at the Pittsburgh Zoo, Zappala stated that he would not charge his mother, Elizabeth Derkosh, who lifted her son to get a better point of view. He stated he was still investigating if the zoo had been at fault.

Zappala was later involved in a dispute with Pittsburgh Public Safety Director Stephen A. Bucar over whether the city police bureau should change its eyewitness identification procedures. Zappala urged the police bureau to discontinue its use of simultaneous photo arrays, in which witnesses were typically shown photos of six to eight suspects on one sheet of paper, in favor of sequential photo arrays, in which they were shown photos individually.

In 2016, Zappala paid nearly $1,400 in bitcoin as ransom after his office computer network was taken hostage by the Avalanche phishing group.

In 2019, Zappala was re-elected with 59 percent of the primary vote and 57 percent in the general.

=== Plea deal controversy ===
In 2021, Zappala sent an email to his prosecutors directing them not to offer plea deals to black attorney Milton Raiford, who had voiced criticisms about the criminal justice system. Raiford had publicly accused Zappala's office of being "systematically racist" and making varying plea offers depending on skin color during a court hearing. In his email, sent five days later, Zappala asserted that Raiford's cases should proceed based on the information as filed, and any withdrawal of charges would require approval by the front office.

The policy was criticized by legal experts, civil rights groups, public officials, and criminal justice advocates as unethical, discriminatory, vindictive, and an abuse of power. Judge Anthony Mariani of the Allegheny County Common Pleas Court declared that he would no longer accept plea deals from Zappala's office, citing unequal treatment of defendants based on who was representing them. Mariani, who had presided over the court hearing where Raiford voiced his criticisms, feared that Zappala's email policy could infringe on defendants' rights to effective counsel and equal protection under the law. The Allegheny County Bar Association declared Zappala's email "unacceptable" in a statement on June 3, 2021, expressing concern over its potential effect on justice access and the rights of criminal defendants. They also demanded an investigation by the Pennsylvania Disciplinary Board into Zappala's actions. Similarly, the Pennsylvania Bar Association denounced Zappala's email as a violation of the legal profession and the rule of law, stating that it breached ethical rules against discrimination or retaliation based on race or other protected characteristics.

Some demanded Zappala's resignation or called for an investigation into his actions. Zappala defended his email, claiming its intention was to uphold consistent, evidence-based decision-making and to counteract unfounded allegations of racism. He accused Raiford of misrepresenting a plea offer in another case and undermining the system.

=== 2023 election ===
Zappala won a 7th term in the 2023 district attorney election. Although he lost the Democratic primary to challenger Matt Dugan, Zappala co-ordinated with Bob Howard of the North Hills GOP to organize a write-in campaign in the Republican primary. His challenger, Matt Dugan, served as the chief public defender of Allegheny County and ran as a progressive candidate, campaigning on promises of criminal justice reform and diverting low-level offenders from incarceration.

On May 16, 2023, Dugan emerged victorious in the Democratic primary, 56% to 44%. Despite losing the Democratic primary, the North Hills GOP write-in campaign proved successful, and Zappala was nominated by the Republicans.

I thought about suing the city. We had a consent order some years before I took office. And the city was placed under basically a receivership. And it was overseen by a federal judge. That was because policing was not being done well and there were substantial concerns about the system collapsing and that type of thing. I think we're moving in that direction. I'll do it again.

— Stephen Zappala, October 26, 2023

On October 26, 2023, during an interview on "The Big K Morning Show with Larry Richert and Marty Griffin" on KDKA Radio, Zappala discussed the idea of suing the City of Pittsburgh to place the police force under federal receivership. He implied that this action would allow him to exercise direct authority over the City of Pittsburgh police force. There is no evidence to support this claim, either that the City of Pittsburgh police force was placed under federal receivership, or that Zappala could undertake such an action. He may be referring to a 1997 investigation of the Pittsburgh Bureau of Police, which was undertaken to see whether there was a "pattern or practice" of unconstitutionality or civil rights abuses, but whether this was his intended meaning or not is unclear. In response, the mayor of Pittsburgh, Ed Gainey, released a statement saying, "It is evident that Mr. Zappala, unable to rely on his 20-year career, opts instead to mislead and incite fear to sway the election," Mr. Gainey remarked. "We have reviewed the case law, and if Mr. Zappala has a case or a statute that he can cite to prove he has the authority to seize control of our Pittsburgh Bureau of Police, I'd love to see it."

In the same interview on "The Big K Morning Show with Larry Richert and Marty Griffin" on KDKA Radio, Zappala also spoke about his opponent, Matt Dugan, explaining, "They're being funded by... what's his name? Soros. [Soros] contributed a couple hundred thousand dollars to this guy, Dugan, this week. I mean, so my man is Darth Vader." This reflects similar inaccurate statements made by Zappala's campaign spokesperson, Mike Mikus, who said in a tweet, "It says a lot about [Matt Dugan] that he would allow one dark money group funded by one billionaire to control every aspect of his campaign." Unlike this claim, Dugan's campaign was supported by the Pennsylvania Justice and Public Safety PAC, which is not a "dark money" group as it is transparent about its donor.

On November 7, 2023, Zappala was re-elected, this time on the Republican ballot line, with 51.4 percent of the vote.

== Personal life ==
Zappala lives in suburban Fox Chapel, Pennsylvania with his wife, Mary. They have four sons.

== See also ==
- Allegheny County Police Department
- Allegheny County Sheriff's Office
- District attorney
- Pittsburgh Police

Legal offices
Preceded by Robert E. Colville	District Attorney of Allegheny County; 1998–present	Incumbent
