= Judith Ference Olson =

American judge (born 1957)

Judith F. Olson

Judge of the Superior Court of Pennsylvania
- Incumbent
- Assumed office January 3, 2010
- Preceded by: Richard B. Klein

Personal details
- Born: October 19, 1957 (age 68) Pittsburgh, Pennsylvania
- Party: Republican
- Education: Saint Francis University (B.A.); Duquesne University School of Law (J.D.)

Judith Ference Olson (born October 19, 1957, in Pittsburgh, Pennsylvania) is an American lawyer and jurist who currently serves as a judge of the Superior Court of Pennsylvania. She was first elected on November 3, 2009, and her ten-year term began in January 2010. She was retained in the 2020 election to serve an additional ten-year term, until January 2030.

== Education and legal career ==
Olson was born 1957 in Pittsburgh, Pennsylvania. She attended Saint Francis University where she obtained her Bachelor of Arts degree in 1979. She then attended Duquesne University School of Law in Pittsburgh, Pennsylvania, where she enrolled for a JD program, she graduated in 1982. Judith Olson started her career as a Law clerk for Honorable Maurice B. Cohill in 1982 and served there for two years. In 1984, she became a partner with Dickie, McCamey & Chilcote, a law firm in Pittsburgh. In 2000, she left Dickie, McCamey & Chilcote to join Schnader Harrison Segal & Lewis as a partner. She remained a partner with the law firm for eight years.

In 2008, Olson was endorsed by Pennsylvania State Senators Jane Orie and John Pippy for an appointment to the Court of Common Pleas of Allegheny County. She was appointed by Governor Edward G. Rendell and thereafter, unanimously confirmed by the Pennsylvania State Senate. In October 2008, she was appointed to the Allegheny County Court of Common Pleas, and assigned to the Civil Division.

In February 2009, Olson received the endorsement of the Republican State Committee to fill one of three vacancies on the Superior Court. She received a rating of Highly Recommended by the Pennsylvania Bar Association.

On November 3, 2009, Olson was elected to an open seat on the Pennsylvania Superior Court. She was sworn in to the Superior Court on January 7, 2010. During the ceremony, she expressed gratitude to her Common Pleas staff, remarking, “You always made me look good, even when I didn’t know what I was doing,” and noted the extensive effort she and her husband had put into the campaign: “We put 50,000 miles on the car together this past year.”

In 2015, Judge Olson ran unsuccessfully for one of three open seats on the Supreme Court of Pennsylvania (which had been created by the resignation in disgrace of Joan Orie Melvin, the resignation of Chief Justice Ronald D. Castille in the pendency of Williams v. Pennsylvania, 579 U.S. 1 (2016), and the retirement of Justice Seamus McCaffery). During a meeting at the Armstrong County Courthouse Annex, Judge Olson said, “[Pennsylvania's Supreme Court] has been rocked by scandal. We need to instill confidence that judges have integrity with reputations of being fair and critical — otherwise, how do we then expect people to respect our decisions?” After the meeting, Judge Olson said, “Gas drilling and lease cases are clearly on the rise. I've had a number of these appeals and have a lot of experience in that area. This will continue to be an important issue.”.
