= Robert J. Colville =

American judge (born 1965)

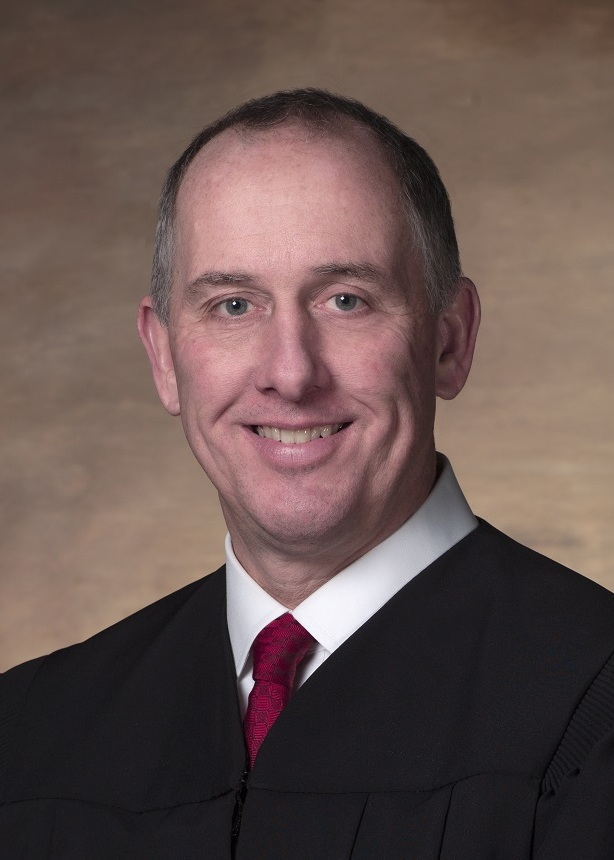
- Colville in 2021

Judge of the United States District Court for the Western District of Pennsylvania
- Incumbent
- Assumed office December 31, 2019
- Appointed by: Donald Trump
- Preceded by: Arthur J. Schwab

Personal details
- Born: Robert John Colville; August 3, 1965 (age 60) Pittsburgh, Pennsylvania, U.S.
- Party: Democratic
- Relations: Robert E. Colville (father)
- Education: Pennsylvania State University (BA); Duquesne University (JD)

Robert John Colville (born August 3, 1965) is a United States district judge of the United States District Court for the Western District of Pennsylvania

== Biography ==
Colville received a Bachelor of Arts from Pennsylvania State University in 1989 and his Juris Doctor from Duquesne University School of Law in 1992. He began his legal career by serving as an intern for the Appellate Division of the Office of the Public Defender of Allegheny County, then became a law clerk from 1992 to 1994 to the Honorable Ralph J. Cappy, Chief Justice of the Supreme Court of Pennsylvania. He worked as an associate at the law firm of Pietragallo Bosick & Gordon in Pittsburgh, Pennsylvania from 1994 to 1999. From 2000 to 2019, Colville served as a judge on the Allegheny County Court of Common Pleas, where he presided over civil matters. From 2012 to 2019, he served as a judge on the Pennsylvania Court of Judicial Discipline.

== Federal judicial service ==
=== Expired nomination to district court under Obama ===
On July 30, 2015, President Obama nominated Colville to serve as a United States district judge of the United States District Court for the Western District of Pennsylvania, to the seat vacated by Judge Gary L. Lancaster, who died on April 24, 2013. He received a hearing before the Senate Judiciary Committee on December 9, 2015. His nomination expired on January 3, 2017, with the end of the 114th Congress.

=== Renomination to district court under Trump ===
On March 1, 2019, President Donald Trump announced his intent to nominate Colville to serve as a United States district judge for the United States District Court for the Western District of Pennsylvania as part of a bipartisan package of nominees which included Stephanie Haines. On March 5, 2019, his nomination was sent to the Senate. President Trump nominated Colville to the seat vacated by Judge Arthur J. Schwab, who assumed senior status on January 1, 2018. On May 9, 2019, his nomination was reported out of committee by a 15–7 vote. A cloture motion on the nomination was presented to the United States Senate on December 16, 2019, but it was withdrawn on December 18, 2019. On December 19, 2019, the Senate confirmed his nomination by a 66–27 vote. He received his judicial commission on December 31, 2019.

Legal offices
Preceded by Arthur J. Schwab	Judge of the United States District Court for the Western District of Pennsylvania; 2019–present	Incumbent
