= Cheryl Lynn Allen =

American lawyer (born 1947)

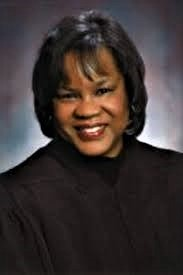
- Judge Cheryl Lynn Allen, c. 2009

Judge of the Superior Court of Pennsylvania
- In office January 6, 2008 – September 4, 2015
- Preceded by: Michael T. Joyce
- Succeeded by: Carl Solano

Judge, Allegheny Court of Common Pleas
- In office 1990–2008

Personal details
- Born: December 16, 1947 (age 78) Homestead, Pennsylvania, U.S.
- Party: Democratic (before 2004); Republican (2007–present)
- Education: Schenley High School; Pennsylvania State University (Bachelor's Degree, 1969); University of Pittsburgh School of Law (Juris Doctor, 1975)

Cheryl Lynn Allen (born December 16, 1947) became the first African-American woman to be elected to the Pennsylvania Superior Court. A Pittsburgh native and former Pittsburgh public school teacher, Judge Allen is a graduate of Penn State University and the University of Pittsburgh School of Law.

She spent fifteen years practicing law before earning a merit selection appointment to the Allegheny County Court of Common Pleas in 1990. Elected to a ten-year term in 1991, she was retained in 2001 for a second ten-year term. In 2007, she was elected to the Superior Court of Pennsylvania.

== Formative years and family ==
Born in Pittsburgh, Pennsylvania, Cheryl Lynn Allen is the oldest child of Robert and Corrine Allen. Married to Jimmie Skipwith, she has three sons, Frederick, Justin and Jason.

A graduate of Schenley High School in Pittsburgh, she was awarded a Bachelor of Arts degree by Pennsylvania State University in 1969 and a Juris Doctor by the University of Pittsburgh School of Law in 1975.

== Education, legal and public service career ==
Following her graduation from Penn State, Allen became an elementary school teacher in the Pittsburgh Public Schools. She held that position for three years, and then embarked on her legal career.

Hired by Neighborhood Law Services as an attorney after earning her juris doctor, she was subsequently employed by the Allegheny County Law Department, worked for the Pennsylvania Human Relations Commission, and also operated a private civil law practice.

During the spring of 1990, Allen was granted a merit selection appointment to the Court of Common Pleas of Allegheny County and assigned to the court's criminal division. She was then elected to a ten-year term in November 1991 and served with the Juvenile Section of the Allegheny County Court of Common Pleas. Retained by voters for a second ten-year term in November 2001, she continued to oversee juvenile cases until April 2, 2004. During her Common Pleas court tenure, she was appointed to the Supreme Court Juvenile Court Judges Commission.

From 2001 to 2006, Allen was employed as an associate professor by Point Park University in Pittsburgh. On April 12, 2004, Allen was reassigned to the criminal division of the Court of Common Pleas, where she remained until assuming her elected position on the Superior Court in 2008.

In 2014, Allen helped to initiate, and then participated with, two of her superior court colleagues, Judge Sallie Updyke Mundy and Judge Christine L. Donohue, in a special argument session hosted by the Pennsylvania State University's Dickinson School of Law at University Park from April 1 to 2. The special outreach session was designed to educate high school, college students and members of the general public about the operations of Pennsylvania's superior court system, and gave attendees the opportunity to witness more than thirty cases related to civil, criminal, and family law.

In 2015, Allen ran unsuccessfully for the Supreme Court of Pennsylvania and retired from the Superior Court of Pennsylvania.

In 2020, she appeared at various events in support of Donald Trump's unsuccessful 2020 run for a second presidential term, including during an interview with Vice President Mike Pence at the Republican National Convention.

=== Legacy ===
Judge Allen is a founding member of Women Without Walls (WWW), a ministry whose mission is to promote unity among women from varied cultural and denominational backgrounds. She serves on the Juvenile Court Judges Commission and on boards including the Pittsburgh Leadership Foundation, Hosanna House, and Cornerstone Television. She is a Waynesburg University Trustee and a former board member of Child Watch and Court Appointment Special Advocates (CASA).

== Awards and honors ==
- Geneva College Serving Leader Award 2015
- New Pittsburgh Courier's Women of Excellence Award, 2008
- The Legal Intelligencer & Pennsylvania Law Weekly Women of the Year, 2008
- Camp Fire USA Incredible Kid Day Breakfast of Champions, 2008
- Celebrate & Share Woman of Achievement Honor Award, 2008
- Three Rivers Youth Nellie Leadership Award, 2006
- Greater Pittsburgh YWCA, Tribute to Women Award, 2006
- Pennsylvania Commission for Women, Woman's History Month Award, 2005
- Juvenile Court Judges Commission Award, 2004
- Allegheny County Bar Association, Juvenile Justice Award, 2004
- CASA Volunteer Recognition Award, 2004
- Second Chance Inc., Women of Standard Award, 2004
- University of Pittsburgh, Women's Law Association, Woman of the Year, 2002
- University of Pittsburgh, Alumni of the Year, 1999
