= Frank J. Zappala =

American politician and lawyer

Frank J. Zappala (May 24, 1898 – January 8, 1988) was an American politician and lawyer.

Zappala was born in Italy. He received his bachelor's degree from Duquesne University and his law degree from Duquesne University School of Law in Pennsylvania. Zappala was a lawyer. He served in the Pennsylvania House of Representatives from 1935 to 1939, from Allegheny County, Pennsylvania, and was a Democrat. Zappala served as a magistrate for the city of Pittsburgh from 1939 to 1950. Zappala ran for election to the Pennsylvania State Senate in 1950 and lost the election. He died in Pleasant Hills, Pennsylvania.
