= Seamus McCaffery =

American judge

Honorable Seamus P. McCaffery

Justice of Supreme Court of Pennsylvania
- In office January 7, 2008 – October 27, 2014
- Preceded by: James J. Fitzgerald III
- Succeeded by: David Wecht

Judge of Superior Court of Pennsylvania
- In office January 4, 2004 – January 4, 2008
- Succeeded by: Robert A. Freedberg

Administrative Judge of Philadelphia County Municipal Court
- In office 2001–2004

Judge of Philadelphia County Municipal Court
- In office 1993–2001

Personal details
- Born: June 3, 1950 (age 76) Belfast, Northern Ireland, United Kingdom
- Party: Democratic
- Relatives: Daniel McCaffery (brother)
- Education: Temple University Beasley School of Law, J.D., 1989; La Salle University, B.A., 1977
- Profession: Judge
- Website: Official Website

Military service
- Allegiance: United States
- Branch/service: Marine Corps (1968–1985); Air Force (1985–2008)
- Years of service: 1968–2008
- Rank: Captain (Marine Corps); Colonel (Air Force)

Seamus P. McCaffery (born June 3, 1950) is an American retired Justice on the Supreme Court of Pennsylvania. He is a member of the Democratic Party. Prior to his election to the Supreme Court, he was a judge on the Superior Court of Pennsylvania, and prior to that was a municipal court judge in Philadelphia. He was the judge at "Eagles Court", an ad hoc court created to deal with unruly fans at Philadelphia Eagles games.

== Personal ==
McCaffery was born in Belfast, Northern Ireland in 1950. His family emigrated to the United States when he was five. He graduated from Cardinal Dougherty High School in Philadelphia and joined the United States Marine Corps.

After leaving active duty, McCaffery joined the Marine Corps Reserve and joined the Philadelphia Police Department. He served in the police department for 20 years, rising to sergeant. While a police officer, McCaffery put himself through university at La Salle University and law school at Temple University. He became a member of the Pennsylvania, New Jersey and Washington, D.C. bars and worked as a litigation associate.

In 2008 he retired as a colonel in the U.S. Air Force Reserve. He is also a 33° Mason.

== Judicial career ==
In 1993, McCaffery won election to Municipal Court in Philadelphia. With support from members of the city council, he developed Eagles Court in 1998 in response to a 1997 Monday Night Football game between the Eagles and the San Francisco 49ers. With over 60 fistfights reported at the nationally televised game, stadium violence became an embarrassment for the city. McCaffery presided over the court, which was convened in the basement of Veterans Stadium, and handed out fines or jail time to fans arrested during games. Prior to protests at the 2000 Republican National Convention in Philadelphia, McCaffery announced a plan for the preventive detention of protesters. Because of this, defense attorneys asked him to recuse himself from trials involving the protests, but he refused, without hearing the arguments.

He was elected to the Superior Court in 2003 and successfully ran for the Supreme Court in 2007, where he was a landslide winner attaining over 2 million votes statewide.

== Resignation ==
McCaffery abruptly resigned from the Pennsylvania Supreme Court on October 27, 2014, one week after his October 20, 2014 suspension by four fellow Justices and the public disclosure by Chief Justice Ronald Castille that Justice McCaffery had sent or received 234 emails containing pornography between late 2008 and May 2012 to an agent in the attorney general's office. The Chief Justice had requested copies of the emails from Attorney General Kathleen Kane.

A fellow justice, Michael Eakin, (who abstained from the suspension vote) also had gone public with an accusation he filed on October 17, 2014, that Justice McCaffery tried to coerce him into taking his side against Chief Justice Castille. The justices voting to suspend McCaffery cited King's Bench power to "protect and preserve the integrity" of the state's judicial system. The justices, in their order suspending McCaffery, directed the state Judicial Conduct Board, which was already investigating McCaffery, to determine within 30 days whether there was "probable cause to file formal misconduct charges" against him.

The court said McCaffery may also have allowed his wife, who was his chief legal clerk, to collect legal referral fees while she was a state court employee, and he may have tried to fix a traffic ticket for her. In his concurring statement on the suspension, Chief Justice Castille described McCaffery as exhibiting the traits of a sociopath.

The Supreme Court confirmed McCaffery's resignation in an order lifting his suspension. McCaffery's retirement agreement not to seek senior judge status and not seek future judicial positions ended the state Judicial Conduct Board investigation of him. By retiring instead of being impeached, McCaffery was able to keep an $11,000 per month retirement benefit ($134,000 annual pension) from the State Employees' Retirement System (SERS) paid for by Pennsylvania taxpayers, even after he cashed out $455,000 of his own contributions plus interest.

== See also ==
- Supreme Court of Pennsylvania
