= Christine Donohue =

American judge (born 1952)

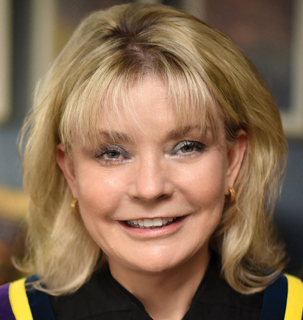

Justice of the Supreme Court of Pennsylvania
- Incumbent
- Assumed office January 4, 2016
- Preceded by: Correale Stevens

Personal details
- Born: December 24, 1952 (age 73) Coaldale, Pennsylvania, U.S.
- Party: Democratic
- Education: East Stroudsburg University (BA); Duquesne University (JD)

Christine L. Donohue (born December 24, 1952) is a justice of the Supreme Court of Pennsylvania. Prior to her election to that court in 2015, she was an elected member of the Superior Court of Pennsylvania, a seat she had held since 2008. She had also performed nearly three decades of service as a trial lawyer and litigator in Allegheny County, Pennsylvania.

== Early life and education ==
Donohue was born Christine Lewis in Coaldale, Pennsylvania, on December 24, 1952, and grew up in nearby Lansford, the daughter of Steve Lewis, a Lansford native and United Mine Worker, and Mary Lewis, a native of Palmerton, Pennsylvania, dress factory seamstress, and member of the International Ladies Garment Workers Union.

She recounted an event from her childhood that had "a lifelong effect on...her integrity," recalling her father finding an envelope containing thousands of dollars while she was out walking with him one day in Lansford and remembered him returning the money to the funeral home nearby, assuming that the person who had lost the money had been planning on paying for funeral services for a family member or friend. Donohue said she defines integrity as "when you do the right thing and nobody knows about it," adding that her sense of integrity comes from her parents.

Donohue attended St. Peter and Paul's Elementary School and graduated from Marian Catholic High School in Hometown, Pennsylvania. She also studied as an undergraduate and graduate student at East Stroudsburg State College, where she received a Bachelor of Arts degree in political science. Donohue is a graduate of the Duquesne University School of Law in Pittsburgh, where she earned her Juris Doctor. She has been an adjunct professor at the same law school, and has taught ethics for attorneys there. She also served on the Duquesne Law Review.

== Career ==
Donohue worked for twenty-seven years as a personal injury attorney and in commercial litigation. She began her private practice career as an attorney for Sikov & Love, and then became a partner at Evans Rose Quinn & Donohue, where she worked as a litigator in state and federal-level cases.

When Evans Rose Quinn & Donohue merged with the Pittsburgh law firm of Buchanan, Ingersoll & Rooney, she became a shareholder in that firm in 1989. An attorney who represented the Westinghouse Electric Corporation during the Phar-Mor case between 1996 and 1997, she worked for Klett, Lieber Rooney & Schorling.

She served as a judge of the Pennsylvania Court of Judicial Discipline, which handles complaints against judges, and sat on the Disciplinary Board of the Supreme Court of Pennsylvania, which handles complaints against lawyers.

In 2008, Donohue began her service on the Superior Court of Pennsylvania, the busiest appellate court in the United States. During her Oath of Office Ceremony, which took place at 3:00 p.m. on January 11, 2008 in the Supreme Court Courtroom in Pittsburgh, she was assisted in her robing by her sister, Jacqueline Lewis, and brother, Steven Lewis.

She subsequently participated in roughly 7,000 decisions on the Superior Court of Pennsylvania during her tenure there. Donohue has also served on the Pennsylvania Board of Law Examiners, and was chairwoman of the Pennsylvania Judicial Conduct Board.

In 2011, she participated in the Pennsylvania Superior Court's first en banc session ever held at a high school. During the event, MMI Preparatory School students in Freeland received an hour-long briefing about the court's history and operations prior to the judicial debate.

In 2014, she participated with two of her superior court colleagues, Judge Cheryl Lynn Allen and Judge Sallie Updyke Mundy, in a special argument session hosted by the Pennsylvania State University's Dickinson School of Law at University Park from April 1 to 2. The special outreach session was designed to help educate high school, college students and members of the general public about the operations of Pennsylvania's superior court system, and gave attendees the opportunity to witness more than thirty cases related to civil, criminal, and family law.

Donohue ran as a Democrat for the Pennsylvania Supreme Court in 2015, and was part of a Democratic sweep of all three court vacancies, along with Kevin Dougherty, and David Wecht. They defeated Republican candidates Judith Olsen, Michael George, and Anne Covey, in a campaign that saw more than $15 million in donations from special interests. Donohue received a "highly recommended" rating from the Pennsylvania Bar Association, which noted her reputation for "intelligence, conscientiousness and objectivity".

== Civic affairs and philanthropy ==
Donohue has served on the boards of directors of the following:

- Hill House Association
- Make-A-Wish Foundation of Western Pennsylvania
- National Aviary of Pittsburgh
- Turtle Creek Valley Mental Health/Mental Retardation, Inc.

== Personal life ==
Donohue's mother, Mary (Berke) Lewis, died in June 1981. Her father, Steve J. Lewis, who had gone on to serve as a three-time member of the Lansford city council between 1973 and 1982 after retiring from the Lehigh Coal & Navigation Company in 1959, died in June 1985.

Legal offices
| Preceded by Correale Stevens | Justice of the Supreme Court of Pennsylvania; 2016–present | Incumbent |
