= David Wecht =

American judge (born 1962)

Justice of the Pennsylvania Supreme Court
- Incumbent
- Assumed office January 4, 2016
- Preceded by: Seamus McCaffery

Personal details
- Born: David Norman Wecht; May 20, 1962 (age 64) Baltimore, Maryland, U.S.
- Party: Democratic (before 2026); Independent (2026–present)
- Spouse: Valerie Wecht
- Children: 4
- Education: Yale University (BA, JD)

David Norman Wecht (born May 20, 1962) is an American attorney and jurist, who has served as a justice of the Supreme Court of Pennsylvania since 2016. Prior to his election in 2015, Wecht had served as a judge of the Superior Court of Pennsylvania.

== Early life and education ==
He was born in Baltimore, Maryland, on May 20, 1962. Wecht is the son of Cyril Wecht, a nationally-recognized pathologist and longtime Allegheny County Medical Examiner, known for famously disagreeing with the single-bullet theory in the assassination of President John F. Kennedy. His mother spent the first six years of her life living under Nazi occupation in Norway.

Wecht graduated from the Shady Side Academy in 1980. He then attended Yale College, where he was elected to the Phi Beta Kappa Society and graduated with the distinction summa cum laude for his studies in history and political science in 1984. Wecht then attended Yale Law School where he served on the Yale Law Journal and graduated in 1987. He clerked for federal judge George MacKinnon in Washington, D.C., and worked as an associate at Williams & Connolly.

Wecht is Jewish.

== Career ==
Before his election to the Superior Court in 2011, Wecht served in Allegheny County government, holding elected executive and judicial offices since 1998. Wecht served as Allegheny County's elected register of wills and clerk of orphans' court from 1998 to 2003, and then trial judge from February 2003 until January 2012, working extensively in the civil and family divisions. From 2009 to 2011, he served an administrative judge of the Family Division, where he was credited for implementing several reforms, including a conflict counsel program for juvenile delinquency cases, and a unified family court, in which the same jurist guides a family through its entire experience with the court.

Wecht ran as a Democrat for Pennsylvania Supreme Court in 2015, and was part of a Democratic sweep of all three court vacancies, along with Kevin Dougherty and Christine Donohue. They defeated Republican candidates Judith Olsen, Michael George, and Anne Covey in a campaign that has been described by media outlets and advocacy groups as the "most expensive judicial election in U.S. history". Wecht campaigned on a "five-point plan" to improve transparency and ethical standards in the Pennsylvania judiciary, calling for a ban on nepotism and gifts to judges, "mandatory ethics training" for judges, a requirement that judges state for the record why they are recusing themselves from a case, and the implementation of cameras in the courtroom except in the cases of child abuse and juvenile cases.

In August 2018, Wecht partially concurred when the majority found that the criminal conviction of a rapper for making a song entitled "Fuck the Police" did not violate the First Amendment to the United States Constitution because the song was found to contain true threats.

In November 2020, Wecht ruled in a lawsuit challenging Joe Biden's victory in Pennsylvania that the effort to overturn the results of the election was "futile" and "a dangerous game."

In June 2021, Wecht ruled that the prosecutor who brought the case against Bill Cosby was bound by the promise his predecessor, Bruce Castor, made to not prosecute Mr. Cosby. He wrote that Mr. Cosby relied on this promise when giving otherwise incriminating testimony in the civil case Andrea Constand brought against him in 2005. Supporters of Constand argue that there is no physical evidence of this verbal promise between Cosby and Castor, and Castor was ruled not credible at trial, however, the promise was fully documented in a press release by Castor at the time. Wecht's ruling cites "the undeniable reality that Cosby relied to his detriment upon D.A. Castor’s decision." Cosby's conviction was overturned and any further prosecution was barred. The decision also lamented what Wecht sees as the judiciary permitting testimony akin to character attacks.

In May 2026, Wecht left the Democratic Party to become a political independent, citing concerns of rising antisemitism within the Democratic Party, stating that "increasingly, it has moved from the fringe to the mainstream. It is the duty of all good people to fight this virus, and to do so before it is too late." In his statement about why he was leaving the party, Wecht stated quote, “Nazi tattoos, jihadist chants, intimidation and attacks at synagogues, and other hateful anti-Jewish invective and actions are minimized, ignored, and even coddled."

== Personal life ==
Wecht is married and has four children.

== See also ==
- List of Jewish American jurists

Legal offices
Preceded by Seamus McCaffery	Justice of the Pennsylvania Supreme Court; 2016–present	Incumbent
