= Superior Court of Pennsylvania =

Appellate court in Pennsylvania, US

- Jurisdiction: Pennsylvania, United States except those cases which involve decisions of governmental agencies; public sector legal questions; actions to which the Commonwealth is a party other than criminal cases; or actions to which a not-for-profit, private corporation is a party, all of which are appealed instead to the Commonwealth Court.
- Location: Harrisburg (headquarters); Philadelphia; Pittsburgh
- Composition method: Statewide partisan election with possible retention at term expiration. Vacancies are filled via appointment by the Governor.
- Authorized by: Penn. Const. Art. V § 3; 42 Pa. Cons. Stat. § 541-44
- Appeals to: Supreme Court of Pennsylvania
- Appeals from: Court of Common Pleas
- Judge term length: 10 years
- Number of positions: 15
- Website: Pennsylvania Courts

President Judge
- Currently: Anne Lazarus
- Since: January 7, 2024

The Superior Court of Pennsylvania is one of two Pennsylvania intermediate appellate courts (the other being the Commonwealth Court of Pennsylvania). It is based in Harrisburg.

== Jurisdiction ==
The Superior Court hears appeals in criminal and most civil cases from the Courts of Common Pleas and on matters involving children and families. Most appeals are decided on the submission of briefs only. However, when the parties request oral argument, those sessions are usually heard by panels of three judges sitting in Philadelphia, Harrisburg, or Pittsburgh, but the court also hears some appeals "en banc," i.e., with nine judges. Sometimes, special argument panels sit in other counties around the Commonwealth. Although different panels of three judges may sit to hear appeals, there is only one Superior Court (that is, Pennsylvania is not divided into appellate territories).

== Appeals to the Superior Court ==
Appeals to the Superior Court of Pennsylvania are governed by the Pennsylvania Rules of Appellate Procedure (Pa.R.A.P.).

There are, generally speaking, three kinds of orders from which appeals may be taken to the Superior Court from Pennsylvania's lower courts: final orders (Pa.R.A.P. 341), collateral orders (Pa.R.A.P. 313), and interlocutory appeals as of right (Pa.R.A.P. 311). If the Superior Court questions the appealability of an order from which an appeal has been taken, they will direct the Appellant to "show cause" within ten days why the appeal should not be quashed.

Appeals to the Superior Court are initiated by filing a Notice of Appeal in the trial court. It's important to note that issues not raised in the trial court cannot be raised for the first time on appeal. Green v. Green, 69 A.3d 282, 287 (Pa. Super. 2013). Once the trial court receives the Notice of Appeal, they are tasked with writing an Opinion in support of the order from which the appeal has been taken, directing the court's Prothonotary to transmit what is known as the "Original Record" (a chronological omnibus of all filings entered on the docket from the initiation of the case to the present; "[i]t is black letter law in this jurisdiction that an appellate court cannot consider anything which is not part of the record in the case." Commonwealth v. Martz, 926 A.2d 514, 524 (Pa. Super. 2007)) along with the trial court's opinion, to the Prothonotary of the Superior Court, and directing the Appellant to file a "Concise Statement of Matters Complained of on Appeal", if they have not done so already.

Once the Superior Court's Prothonotary receives the original record and trial court opinion, a briefing schedule is issued to the parties.

== Opinions ==
The Superior Court of Pennsylvania is highly prolific, publishing on average between 10-25 precedential rulings each week (unpublished rulings which do not generate new precedent are referred to as "non-precedential memoranda"). The Superior Court is known for writing their opinions in Verdana, and preferring that submissions by the parties be written in this font as well. The Superior Court is also known for correcting punctuation, capitalization, and grammar when quoting from the opinions of lower courts, setting a high standard for courts throughout Pennsylvania, and displaying the Superior Court's close attention to even the smallest details of the cases before them.

== Controversy ==
In 2013, former Pennsylvania Supreme Court Justice Joan Orie Melvin was convicted of misusing her Superior Court staff, during the time she served as a Superior Court Judge from 1998 to 2010, to aid in her campaign to the Pennsylvania Supreme Court (first in her failed campaign in 2003, and then again during her successful campaign in 2009). Orie Melvin was sentenced to three years house arrest (with the exception that she could leave her house to attend church and work in a soup kitchen) and two years of probation. Judge Lester G. Nauhaus also ordered Orie Melvin to send a note of apology, written on a photograph of herself in handcuffs, to every judge in the state (over 500) as well as apology letters to her staff, and to pay $55,000 in fines and court costs. In 2020, Judge Paul B. Matey of the U.S. Court of Appeals for the 3rd Circuit affirmed her conviction, writing that Orie Melvin “was prosecuted for misusing tax dollars for private benefit", and that she had "required [Superior Court] employees – during the workday and using public resources – to write letters to Republican Party officials, draft political speeches, fill out political questionnaires, prepare campaign fundraising and expense reports and write thank you notes to campaign donors."

== Judges ==
Superior Court judges are elected in statewide elections. The term of a Superior Court Judge is 10 years. After serving 10 years, judges may hold their seats if they win a retention vote. Voters have the right to retain or reject (vote out of office) Superior Court judges in Pennsylvania. Superior Court judges must retire from active service at the age of 75. They may serve as Senior Judges though, as approved by the Pennsylvania Supreme Court.

Name	Born	Start	Term ends	Mandatory retirement (Note: Judges must retire by the last day (December 31) of the calendar year in which they reach the age of 75.)	Party	Law school
Anne Lazarus, President Judge	November 12, 1952 (age 73)	January 4, 2010 (Note: Elected President Judge on January 7, 2024.)	2029	2027	Democratic	Temple
Mary Jane Bowes	July 18, 1954 (age 71)	January 7, 2002	2031	2029	Republican	Pittsburgh
Jack Panella	May 4, 1955 (age 71)	January 5, 2004	2033	2030	Democratic	Columbus
Judith Olson	October 19, 1957 (age 68)	January 4, 2010	2029	2032	Republican	Duquesne
Victor Stabile	September 14, 1957 (age 68)	January 6, 2014	2033	2032	Republican	Dickinson
Alice Beck Dubow	March 25, 1959 (age 67)	January 4, 2016	2035	2034	Democratic	Penn
Deborah Kunselman	September 24, 1967 (age 58)	January 1, 2018	2027	2042	Democratic	Notre Dame
Carolyn Nichols	September 4, 1955 (age 70)	January 1, 2018	2027	2030	Democratic	Temple
Mary Murray	July 6, 1970 (age 55)	January 1, 2018	2027	2045	Republican	Duquesne
Maria McLaughlin	May 27, 1966 (age 60)	January 1, 2018	2027	2041	Democratic	Widener
Megan King	December 8, 1969 (age 56)	January 6, 2020	2029	2044	Republican	Pittsburgh
Megan Sullivan	October 19, 1971 (age 54)	January 3, 2022	2031	2046	Republican	Temple
Jill Beck	October 16, 1979 (age 46)	January 1, 2024	2033	2054	Democratic	Duquesne
Timika Lane	October 5, 1972 (age 53)	January 1, 2024	2033	2047	Democratic	Rutgers-Camden
Brandon Neuman	November 1, 1981 (age 44)	January 5, 2026	2035	2056	Democratic	Duquesne

=== Senior judges ===
Name	Born	Party	Law school
Correale Stevens (Note: Judge Stevens was a former Associate Justice of the Pennsylvania Supreme Court (2013–2016).), President Judge Emeritus	October 6, 1946 (age 79)	Republican	Dickinson
Kate Elliott (Note: Served as Judge of the Superior Court from December 31, 1989–2017.), President Judge Emerita	June 8, 1949 (age 77)	Democratic	Duquesne
John Bender (Note: Served as Judge of the Superior Court from January 5, 2002–December 31, 2023. Became Senior Judge of the Superior Court on January 1, 2024.), President Judge Emeritus	November 6, 1948 (age 77)	Republican	Duquesne
