= Sacred Heart Cathedral (Fairbanks, Alaska) =

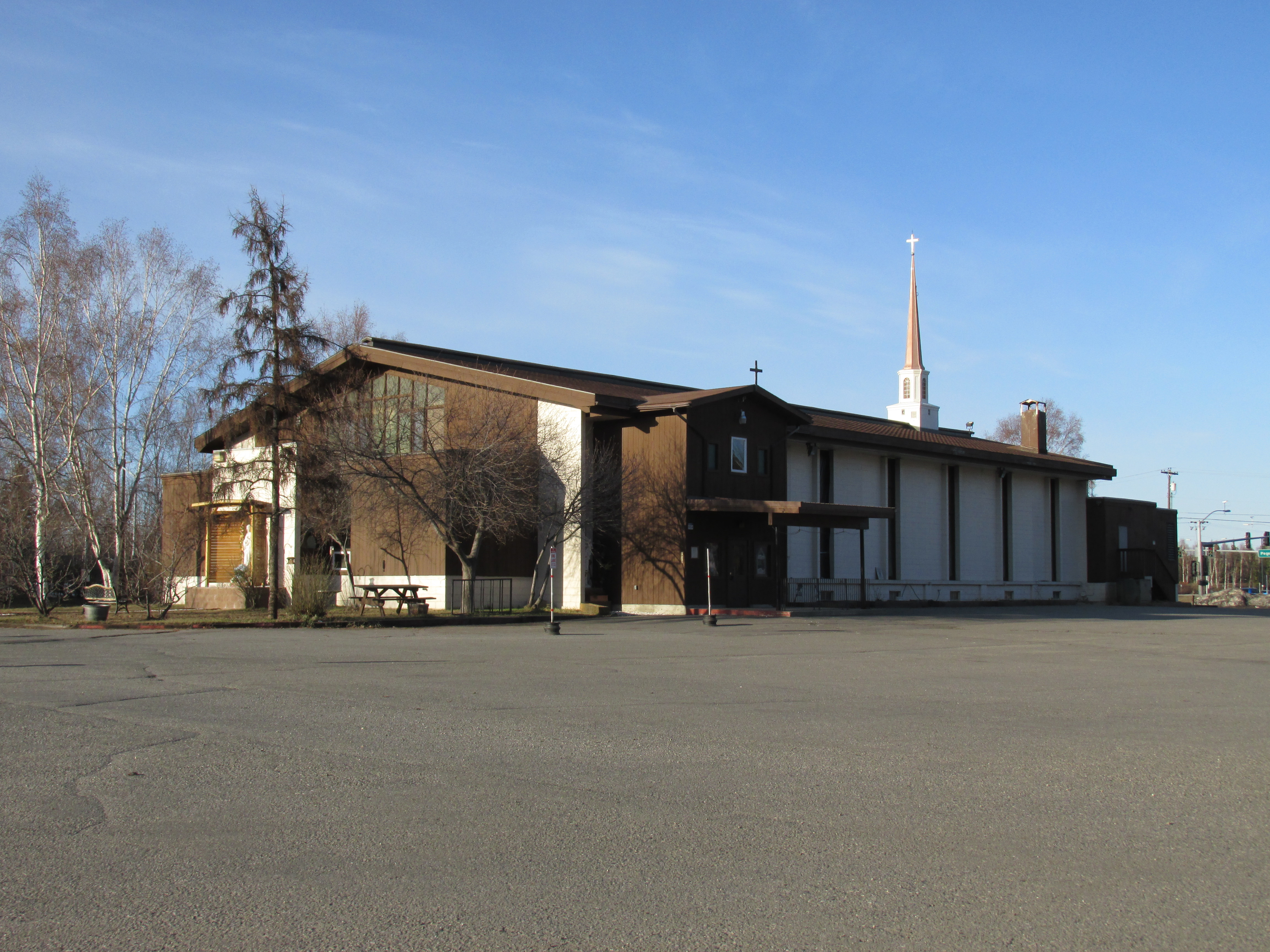
- Sacred Heart Cathedral, Fairbanks

- Location within Alaska
- 64°50′11″N 147°46′50″W
- Location: 2501 Airport Way; Fairbanks, Alaska
- Country: United States
- Denomination: Roman Catholic Church
- Website: sacredheartak.org

History
- Status: Cathedral
- Dedication: Sacred Heart of Jesus

Architecture
- Style: Modern
- Completed: 1966

Specifications
- Materials: Brick veneer

Administration
- Province: Archdiocese of Anchorage–Juneau
- Diocese: Fairbanks

Clergy
- Bishop(s): Most Rev. Steven Maekawa, O.P.
- Pastor: Rev. Peter Soohyun Bang

Sacred Heart Cathedral is a cathedral of the Catholic Church in the United States. It is the mother church of the Diocese of Fairbanks and is the seat of the bishop of the diocese. It is located in the City of Fairbanks in the state of Alaska and sits close to the geographic center of the city.

== History ==
Prior to the construction of Sacred Heart, Immaculate Conception Church in downtown Fairbanks served as the city's cathedral. Ground was broken for Sacred Heart Cathedral in 1962 on a large tract of land at the intersection of Airport and Peger Roads. Just a few years before, this area was largely wilderness, until the development of residential subdivisions and the A-67 site to the north of the cathedral. The Rev. James Spils, S.J. served as construction superintendent. He was responsible for other construction projects in Alaska as well. The project proceeded slowly and work was done as money became available. The first Mass was celebrated on Palm Sunday, April 3, 1966, and the cathedral was consecrated by Bishop Francis Doyle Gleeson, S.J., on the Solemnity of the Sacred Heart, June 17, 1966. Jesuit priests served the parish until 1982, when priests from the Diocese of Fairbanks took over. Bishop Donald Joseph Kettler served as the parish's pastor from 2007 to 2013.

The expansion of Airport Road into the Airport Way expressway during the 1970s placed the cathedral's north wall very close to the road, which increased its architectural prominence to passing traffic. Peger Road, which originally led from Airport Road two miles south to a homestead along a section line, has also been expanded steadily over the years. Peger Road is farther away from the structure, and therefore it is not as prominent to traffic along that road.

The tract of land upon which the cathedral sits is also home to the diocesan offices, a rectory, a Knights of Columbus hall and maintenance buildings, as well as additional residences for priests, nuns and others.

== See also ==
- List of Catholic cathedrals in the United States
- List of cathedrals in the United States
