= Francis Gleeson =

Francis Gleeson is the name of:

- Francis Gleeson (politician) (1937–2015), member of the Pennsylvania House of Representatives 1969–1978
- Francis Gleeson (priest) (1884–1959), Irish Roman Catholic priest
- Francis Doyle Gleeson (1895–1983), American Roman Catholic priest
