= Joseph Raphael John Crimont =

French-born Catholic bishop and Jesuit missionary

The Right Reverend Joseph Raphael John Crimont SJ
- Vicar Apostolic of Alaska
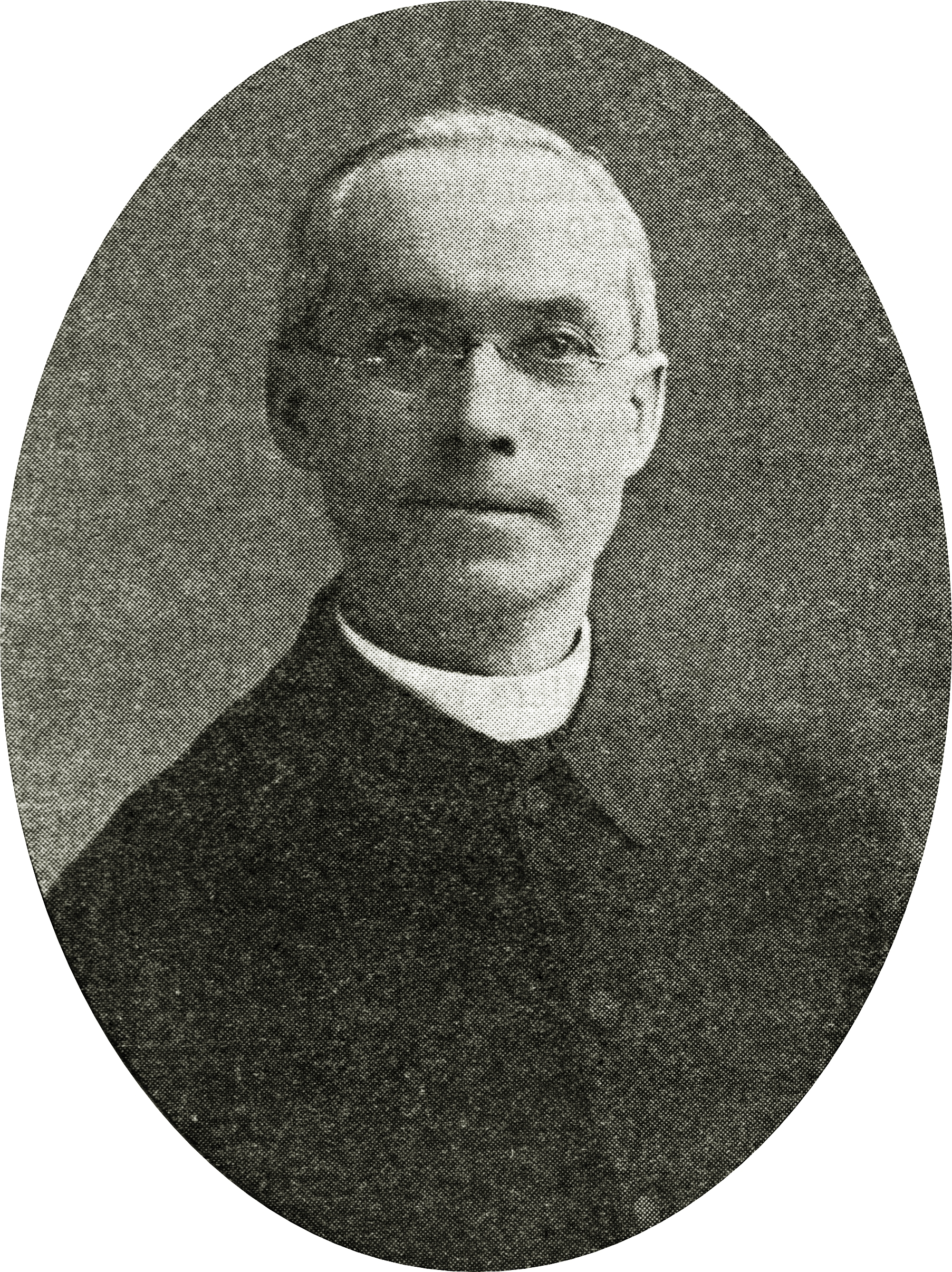
- Church: Catholic Church
- See: Vicariate Apostolic of Alaska
- Appointed: February 15, 1917
- Term ended: May 20, 1945 (his death)
- Predecessor: Office established
- Successor: Walter James Fitzgerald

Orders
- Ordination: August 26, 1888 by James Gibbons
- Consecration: July 25, 1917 by Alexander Christie

Personal details
- Born: February 2, 1858 Ferrières, Hauts-de-France, France
- Died: May 20, 1945 (aged 87) Juneau, Alaska, U.S.

Joseph Raphael John Crimont SJ (February 2, 1858 – May 20, 1945) was a French-born Catholic bishop and Jesuit missionary. He was the first Vicar Apostolic of Alaska (now the Diocese of Fairbanks), serving from 1917 until his death in 1945.

== Early life ==
Crimont was born in Ferrières, to Joseph and Alexandrine (née Niquet) Crimont. The family later moved to Amiens, where he received his early education. After graduating from Lycée la Providence, he entered the Society of Jesus at the college of Saint-Acheul in August 1875 and professed his first vows in September 1877.

When the 1881 Jules Ferry laws led to the expulsion of the Jesuits in France, Crimont continued his studies at Victoria College in St Helier, Jersey and Collège Saint-Servais in Liège, Belgium. At Liège he also served as a prefect and teacher of catechism (1882–83). Taking ill and given only weeks to live, he traveled to Lille and there met the Italian priest John Bosco, whose prayers Crimont claimed restored him to health.

In 1886 he volunteered for missionary work with fellow Jesuit Joseph Cataldo and came to the United States, where entered Woodstock College. He was ordained to the priesthood at Woodstock on August 26, 1888, by Cardinal James Gibbons. Following his ordination, he spent a few years as a missionary among the Crow people in Montana.

Crimont briefly returned to Europe to finish his Jesuit formation at Drongen Abbey in Ghent, and made his solemn vows as a Jesuit on his thirty-sixth birthday, February 2, 1894.

== Work in Alaska ==
Crimont sporting his arctic robes while attending the 28th International Eucharistic Congress in Chicago in 1926

Having become acquainted with the Alaskan missionary Pascal Tosi during his travels, Crimont came to Alaska in August 1894. He was stationed at the Holy Cross Mission along the Yukon River, becoming the mission's superior in 1896. After an excursion in severe weather left him in poor health, he was sent to recover at Gonzaga College in Spokane, Washington, where he served as rector from 1901 to 1904.

He was named Prefect Apostolic of Alaska by Pope Pius X on March 28, 1904, placing him in charge of all Catholic missions in the territory. The prefecture flourished over the years and was elevated to an apostolic vicariate in December 1916. On February 15, 1917, Crimont was appointed the first Vicar Apostolic of Alaska and titular bishop of Ammaedara by Pope Benedict XV. He received his episcopal consecration on the following July 25 from Archbishop Alexander Christie of Oregon City, with Bishops Edward O'Dea of Seattle and Augustine Schinner of Spokane serving as co-consecrators, at St. James Cathedral in Seattle.

As Vicar Apostolic, he traveled extensively and made regular pastoral visits across the nearly 600,000 square miles of his jurisdiction. He oversaw notable growth in the number of parishes, clergy, and institutions during his 28-year tenure. By the time of the silver jubilee of his episcopal consecration in 1942, the vicariate had 44 churches, 30 missions with chapels, eight diocesan priests, 20 Jesuit brothers, and 68 religious sisters, including members of the newly created Sisters of Our Lady of the Snows for Alaska Native women. Given Crimont's advanced age, Walter J. Fitzgerald was named coadjutor vicar apostolic in 1938 to assist Crimont and eventually succeed him.

Crimont died in Juneau on May 20, 1945. At age 87, he was the oldest Catholic bishop in the United States at the time of his death. Governor Ernest Gruening ordered that flags across Alaska be flown at half-mast for three days following Crimont's death.

Catholic Church titles
Preceded by None	Vicar Apostolic of Alaska; 1917–1945	Succeeded by Walter James Fitzgerald
