= Louis Renner =

Louis Lawrence Renner, S.J., (25 April 1926 – 24 March 2015) was an American Jesuit priest, historian, writer and academic. Renner, a professor of German who founded the Latin language program at the University of Alaska Fairbanks, specialized in the history of the Roman Catholic Church in Alaska. He authored several volumes and books on Alaska's Catholic history, including the extensive "Alaskana Catholica," which was published in 2005.

== Biography ==
=== Early life and education ===
Renner was born on April 25, 1926, in Bismarck, North Dakota. Although called "Louis", he was baptized "Aloysius", a Latin form of that name. He was raised on a family homestead located between Fallon and Flasher, North Dakota, just outside Bismarck. He was the second eldest of the family's seven children. His parents, John J. Renner and Rose Gustin, were the descendants of German and Russian emigrants to the United States. The family spoke German at home, so Renner did not learn English until he entered elementary school when he was seven-years old. Since there were no Catholic schools in Flasher, North Dakota, Renner and his siblings enrolled at a boarding school in Fallon, North Dakota, run by the Benedictine Sisters.

The family moved from North Dakota to Tacoma, Washington, in 1937 during the Great Depression. His father, who disliked farming, welcomed the chance to sell the family's farm, which had been hit hard by droughts. He graduated from Bellarmine Preparatory School in Tacoma in 1944. He joined the Society of Jesus, commonly called the Jesuits, in March 1944, shortly before his 18th birthday, and entered the Jesuit Novitiate in Sheridan, Oregon after high school.

Renner received a master's degree in philosophy from Gonzaga University in 1951. He also completed both a licentiate degree and a master of sacred theology degree from Santa Clara University in California by 1958. He also studied in France, Italy and Germany as part of his training to become a Jesuit. For example, Renner completed an intensive, six-week French language course of study at the Sorbonne in Paris as preparation for his final year of Jesuit training in Paray-le-Monial, France.

Renner enrolled in an intensive German language course at the University of Vienna in August 1961. He graduated magna cum laude from LMU Munich with a doctorate of philosophy in 1965.

=== Alaska ===
Renner was ordained a Jesuit on June 15, 1957, in Spokane, Washington. He was sent to Fairbanks, Alaska, in 1958, where he spent more than forty years. Renner taught and worked in both Fairbanks and villages within the Alaska Interior, including Ruby, Tanana and Healy. Renner never got a driver's license during his time in Alaska. He often walked to his office on Peger Road in Fairbanks, completing the 7.5 round trip commute on foot. He taught at Monroe High School, the only Catholic high school in the Diocese of Fairbanks.

Renner was a language professor at the University of Alaska Fairbanks from 1965 to 1980. He taught German and founded the University of Alaska Fairbanks' Latin program.

Louis Renner served as the editor of the Alaska Shepherd, the official newsletter of the Roman Catholic Diocese of Fairbanks, for 21 years. As a historian, Father Renner conducted extensive research on the history of the Catholic Church in Alaska. He published several volumes of work on the subject, including "Alaskana Catholica," released in 2005. He wrote in the preface of "Alaskana Catholica,": "One of the main intents of this volume is to keep alive for posterity the memory of many major Catholic Alaska figures — clerical and lay, Native and non-Native, living and deceased — by the recording of their lives and deeds."

In 2009, Renner published his autobiography, "A Kindly Providence: An Alaskan Missionary's Story 1926-2007."

Father Louis Renner died on March 24, 2015, at the Gonzaga University Jesuit Infirmary in Spokane, Washington, at the age of 88. He was buried in Mount Saint Michael Cemetery in Spokane.
