= Bellarmine Prep =

Bellarmine Prep may refer to one of two Jesuit college preparatory schools:

- Bellarmine College Preparatory, San Jose, California
- Bellarmine Preparatory School, Tacoma, Washington
