= Kevin Dougherty =

American judge (born 1962)

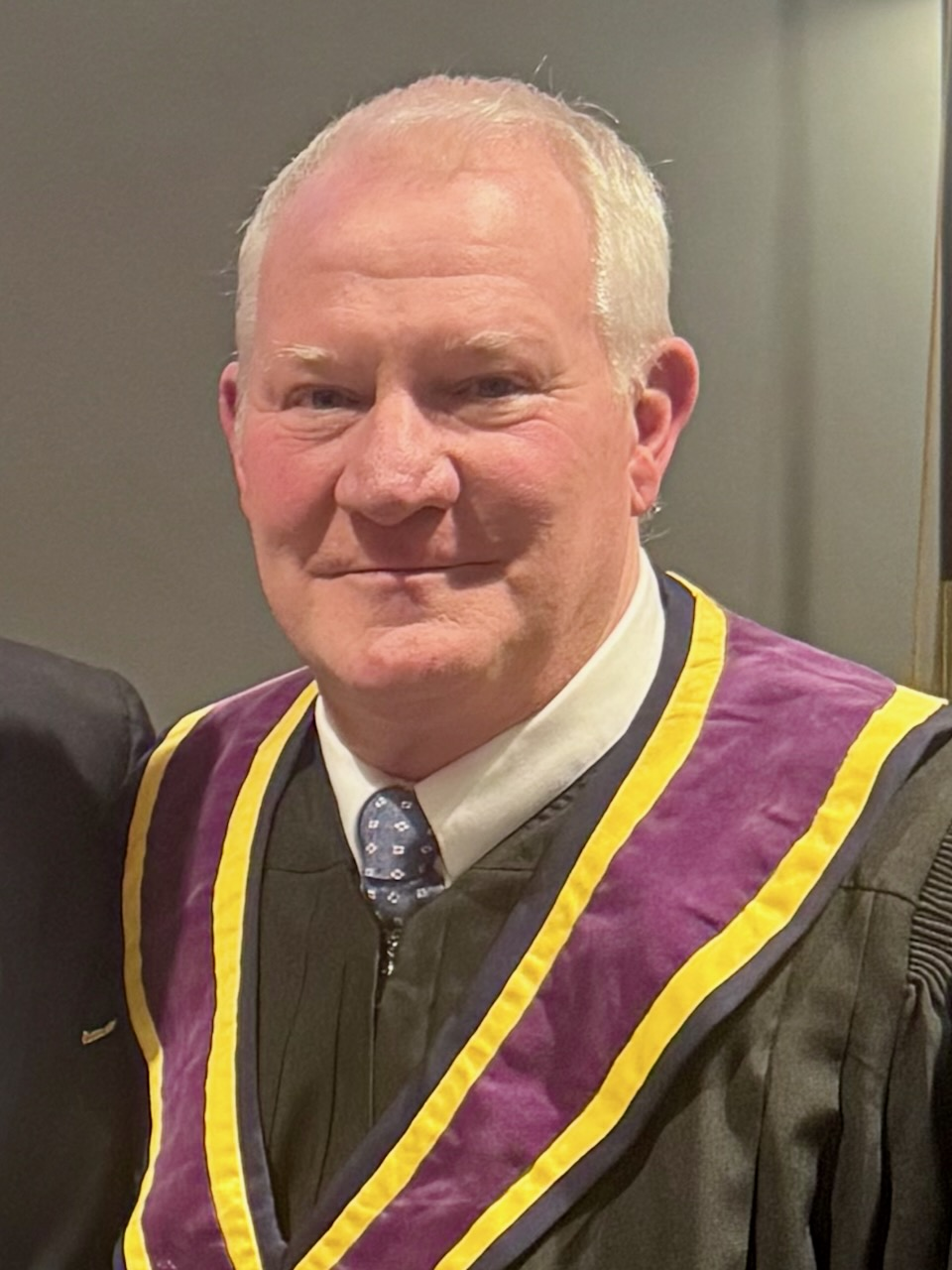
- Dougherty in January 2026

Justice of the Pennsylvania Supreme Court
- Incumbent
- Assumed office January 4, 2016
- Preceded by: Ronald D. Castille

Personal details
- Born: May 19, 1962 (age 64) Philadelphia, Pennsylvania, U.S.
- Party: Democratic
- Relatives: Sean Dougherty (son); John J. Dougherty (brother)
- Education: Temple University (BA); Antioch School of Law (JD)

Kevin M. Dougherty (born May 19, 1962) is a justice of the Supreme Court of Pennsylvania. He previously served on the Pennsylvania Court of Common Pleas in Philadelphia from 2001 to 2016, including as an administrative judge of the trial division.

== Biography ==
Dougherty grew up in South Philadelphia in what he described as a "very blue-collar, working-class neighborhood." He was the first member of his family to graduate from college, working three part-time jobs while attending Temple University. He later earned his Juris Doctor degree from the Antioch School of Law in Washington, D.C. in 1988.

== Judicial career ==
=== Court of Common Pleas (2001–2016) ===
Dougherty was appointed to the Pennsylvania Court of Common Pleas for Philadelphia by Governor Tom Ridge in 2001 and was elected later that year to a full ten-year term, receiving the highest vote total among fourteen candidates. Following his election, Dougherty requested assignment to the family division, where he believed he could have the greatest societal impact.

In 2003, Dougherty became supervising judge of the Juvenile Division of Philadelphia Family Court. In that role, he implemented administrative reforms aimed at improving access to the courts and modernizing court culture. He ran unopposed for retention in 2011 and was retained with 78 percent of the vote, receiving support from both Democratic and Republican voters.

=== Pennsylvania Supreme Court (2016–present) ===
Dougherty was elected to the Supreme Court of Pennsylvania in 2015 and was sworn into office on January 4, 2016. He has since served as an associate justice of the court. While serving on the Supreme Court, Dougherty has led initiatives to improve accessibility in courtrooms, including efforts to make proceedings more inclusive for individuals with sensory sensitivities.

== Electoral history ==
=== 2015 Supreme Court election ===
Dougherty ran as a Democrat in the 2015 election for the Pennsylvania Supreme Court. He was part of a Democratic sweep of all three open seats on the court, alongside David Wecht and Christine Donohue, defeating Republican candidates Judith Olsen, Michael George, and Anne Covey.

The campaign was among the most expensive judicial races in state history, with more than $15 million spent statewide. Dougherty received a "recommended" rating from the Pennsylvania Bar Association and drew significant support from organized labor groups. Media coverage noted that his brother, Philadelphia labor leader John J. "Johnny Doc" Dougherty, played a prominent role in fundraising for the campaign.

=== 2025 retention election ===
The 2025 retention elections for the Pennsylvania Supreme Court drew an unusually high level of attention and spending for what are typically low-profile, yes-or-no judicial retention votes. Dougherty was retained by voters statewide, securing another ten-year term on the court.

== Personal life ==
Dougherty’s brother, John J. “Johnny Doc” Dougherty, was a prominent Philadelphia labor leader. His son, Sean Dougherty, was elected to the Pennsylvania House of Representatives for the 172nd district in the November 2024 general election and began serving in 2025.

Legal offices
Preceded by Ronald D. Castille	Associate Justice of the Supreme Court of Pennsylvania; 2016–present	Incumbent
