= Walter James Fitzgerald =

American prelate

Walter James Fitzgerald SJ
- Vicar Apostolic of Alaska
- Church: Catholic Church
- See: Vicariate Apostolic of Alaska
- In office: May 20, 1945 – July 19, 1947
- Predecessor: Joseph Raphael John Crimont
- Successor: Francis Doyle Gleeson
- Other post: Titular Bishop of Tymbrias (1938-1947)
- Previous post: Coadjutor Vicar Apostolic of Alaska (1938-1945)

Orders
- Ordination: May 16, 1918 by Joseph-Guillaume-Laurent Forbes
- Consecration: February 24, 1939 by Joseph Raphael John Crimont

Personal details
- Born: November 17, 1883 Peola, Washington Territory, United States
- Died: July 19, 1947 (aged 63) Seattle, Washington, United States

Walter James Fitzgerald SJ (November 17, 1883 – July 19, 1947) was an American prelate of the Catholic Church. He served as Vicar Apostolic of Alaska from 1945 until his death in 1947. A Jesuit, he also served as President of Gonzaga University from 1921 to 1927 and of Seattle University from 1929 to 1931.

== Life and church ==
Fitzgerald was born at Peola, in Garfield County, Washington, to Patrick Sarsfield and Johanna Frances (née Kirk) Fitzgerald. He entered the Society of Jesus (more commonly known as the Jesuits) in 1902, and graduated from the normal school in Los Gatos, California, in 1906. He then returned to Washington and served as a professor at Seattle College until 1909, when he enrolled at Gonzaga University in Spokane. He earned his Bachelor of Arts (1910) and Master of Arts (1912) degrees from Gonzaga. From 1912 to 1920, he was a professor at Gonzaga, although his service was interrupted by a period of study at Immaculate Conception College in Montreal, Quebec, Canada (1915–19) to receive his Doctor of Sacred Theology degree.

Fitzgerald was ordained to the priesthood on May 16, 1918. After teaching at the institution for the next three years, he became president of Gonzaga University in 1921, serving in that position until 1927. He afterward served as president of Manresa Hall in Port Townsend (1927–29) and of Seattle College (1929–31). He then served as vice-provincial (1931–32) and later provincial (1932–38) of the Jesuits' Northwestern Province.

On December 14, 1938, Fitzgerald was appointed Coadjutor Vicar Apostolic of Alaska and Titular Bishop of Tymbrias by Pope Pius XI. He received his episcopal consecration on February 24, 1939, from Bishop Joseph Crimont, with Bishops Charles White and Robert Armstrong serving as co-consecrators. Upon the death of Bishop Crimont, Fitzgerald succeeded him as Vicar Apostolic of Alaska on May 20, 1945. He remained in this position until his death in Seattle at the age of 63.

Catholic Church titles
Preceded by Joseph Raphael John Crimont	Vicar Apostolic of Alaska; 1945–1947	Succeeded by Francis Doyle Gleeson
