= Robert Louis Whelan =

American prelate

His Excellency, The Most Reverend Robert Louis Whelan SJ
- Bishop of Fairbanks
- See: Diocese of Fairbanks
- In office: February 22, 1968 to June 1, 1985
- Predecessor: Francis Doyle Gleeson
- Successor: Michael Joseph Kaniecki

Orders
- Ordination: February 22, 1968 by John J. Mitty
- Consecration: February 22, 1968 by Luigi Raimondi; Joseph T. Ryan; Francis Doyle Gleeson

Personal details
- Born: April 16, 1912 Wallace, Idaho, US
- Died: September 15, 2001 (aged 89) Spokane, Washington, US
- Denomination: Roman Catholic
- Education: Mount St. Michael Seminary; Alma College
- Motto: Solicitude and charity

Robert Louis Whelan SJ (April 16, 1912 – September 15, 2001) was an American prelate of the Roman Catholic Church. He served as bishop of the Diocese of Fairbanks in Alaska from 1969 to 1985.

== Biography ==
=== Early years ===
Robert Whelan was born in Wallace, Idaho on April 16, 1912, to Joseph F. and Mary Frances (Kern) Whelan. He attended Our Lady of Lourdes Academy in Wallace for his first two years of high school, then transferred to Gonzaga Preparatory School in Spokane, Washington, where he graduated. On August 3, 1931, Whelan entered the Society of Jesus at the Jesuit Novitiate in Sheridan, Oregon.

After completing his two-year novitiate training, Whelan went to Mount St. Michael Seminary in Spokane for three years of philosophy studies. In 1938, Whelan taught for math and science one year at Gonzaga Prep. In 1939, he taught at Bellarmine Preparatory School in Tacoma, Washington, staying there until 1941. Whelan then entered Alma College in Los Gatos, California, to study theology.

=== Priesthood ===
After professing religious vows as a Jesuit, Whelan was ordained a priest for the Society of Jesus in San Francisco on June 17, 1944, by Archbishop John J. Mitty. Whelan then spent 1945 undergoing his final year of Jesuit training in Port Townsend, Washington.

On July 10, 1946, Whelan began his first assignment as pastor at Nativity of the Blessed Virgin Mary Parish in Juneau in what was then the Territory of Alaska. After 11 years in Juneau, he was appoint pastor in 1957 of the newly established Saint Anthony Parish in Anchorage, Alaska. Whelan later described his time as St. Anthony as "eleven wonderful years" building the new parish.

=== Coadjutor Bishop and Bishop of Fairbanks ===
On December 6, 1967, Pope Paul VI named Whelan as titular bishop of Sicilibba and coadjutor bishop of the Diocese of Fairbanks. He was consecrated on February 22, 1968, by Archbishop Luigi Raimondi, the apostolic delegate to the United States. The co-consecrators were Archbishop John Ryan and Bishop Francis Gleeson. Whelan succeeded as bishop on November 15, 1968, when Bishop Gleeson resigned; Whelan was installed on February 13, 1969. His episcopal motto was "Solicitude and Charity".

As bishop, Whalen made numerous trips by bush plane, boat and snowmobile to remote Native American and Native Alaskan villages throughout the diocese. He established the Native Diaconate Program, ordaining 28 Native Alaskan men to the permanent diaconate. In his free time, Whelan enjoyed water skiing, downhill skiing and biking around Fairbanks.

In 1969, Whelan granted the request for Joseph Lundowski, a lay volunteer, to officially distribute communion at St. Michaels Parish in a remote Alaskan village. Lundowski was neither a priest or a deacon. In 1964, Vicar General Father John E. Gurr had received a letter from a priest that complained that Lundowski was sexually abusing boys in his parish. The diocese took no action. After a local resident spotting Lundowski molesting a young boy, he exposed the scandal in the village. The local priest, himself accused later of child molestation, immediately flew Lundowski out of the village.

=== Retirement and legacy ===
After Whalen was diagnosed with the early symptoms of Alzheimer's disease, he requested the assistance of a coadjutor bishop from the Vatican. Pope John Paul II named Reverend Michael Kaniecki as coadjutor bishop on March 8, 1984, Whelan's resignation as bishop of Fairbanks was accepted by the pope on June 1, 1985. That same year, Whelan celebrated mass on Little Diomede Island in the Aleutian Islands for the small Catholic congregation there. He then served as director of the House of Prayer on the cathedral grounds in Fairbanks.

After his health began to fail, Whelan moved back to Spokane to the Regis Jesuit Community at Gonzaga University. Robert Whelan died in Spokane on September 15, 2001, and was buried in Birch Hill Cemetery in Fairbanks.

Catholic Church titles
Preceded by Francis Doyle Gleeson	Bishop of Fairbanks; 1968–1985	Succeeded by Michael Joseph Kaniecki
