= Monroe Catholic High School =

Location
- 615 Monroe Street; Fairbanks, Alaska 99701; United States
- Coordinates: 64°51′5″N 147°42′57″W

Information
- Type: Private, coeducational
- Religious affiliations: Roman Catholic, (Jesuit)
- Established: 1955 (71 years ago)
- Oversight: Catholic Schools of Fairbanks
- CEEB code: 020037
- Director: Amanda Angaiak
- Principal: Patrick Riggs
- Faculty: 33
- Grades: 9–12
  - Grade 9: 34
  - Grade 10: 36
  - Grade 11: 30
  - Grade 12: 28
- Average class size: 33
- Student to teacher ratio: 4:1
- Colors: Royal and gold
- Team name: Rams
- Accreditation: Northwest Association of Accredited Schools
- Tuition: $13,000
- Namesake: Francis M. Monroe, S.J.

Monroe Catholic High School is a private, Roman Catholic high school in Fairbanks, Alaska. It is the only Catholic high school in the Roman Catholic Diocese of Fairbanks. It is the northernmost Roman Catholic high school in the Americas.

== Background ==
Monroe High School, as it was known at that time, was founded in 1955. For the first academic year, classes were held in the Immaculate Conception Church basement for the nine freshman students. The next year, another class was added when the new modern school building was opened adjacent to the grade school. Each year another class was added until the class of 1959, comprising six by that time, graduated.

== Notable alumni ==
- Suzanne Jackson, visual artist, poet, dancer
- Mike Kelly, Alaska politician
- Pete Kelly, Alaska politician
- Lisa Murkowski, U.S. Senator
- Kirsten Powers, journalist
- Stephen Sundborg, Jesuit priest, president of Seattle University
