= Doc Dougherty =

Doc Dougherty may refer to:

- Brian Dougherty (born 1973), American lacrosse goaltender
- Ed Dougherty (born 1947), American professional golfer
- Johnny Dougherty, Philadelphia labor leader

See also

- Doc Daugherty, Harold Ray Daugherty (1927–2015), American baseball player and manager, and high school football coach
- Doc Daugherty (musician), Ralph Edward Daugherty, American jazz musician
