= Peola, Washington =

Unincorporated community in Washington, United States

- Unincorporated community
- Location within Washington (state) Location within the United States
- Coordinates: 46°18′33″N 117°28′59″W
- Country: United States
- State: Washington
- County: Garfield
- Elevation: 4,114 ft (1,254 m)
- Time zone: UTC-8 (Pacific (PST))
  - Summer (DST): UTC-7 (PDT)
- Area code: 509
- GNIS feature ID: 1511222

Peola is an unincorporated community in Garfield County, Washington, United States.

== Notable people ==
- Walter James Fitzgerald, American Roman Catholic bishop
