= Kevin J. Boyle =

American politician (born 1980)

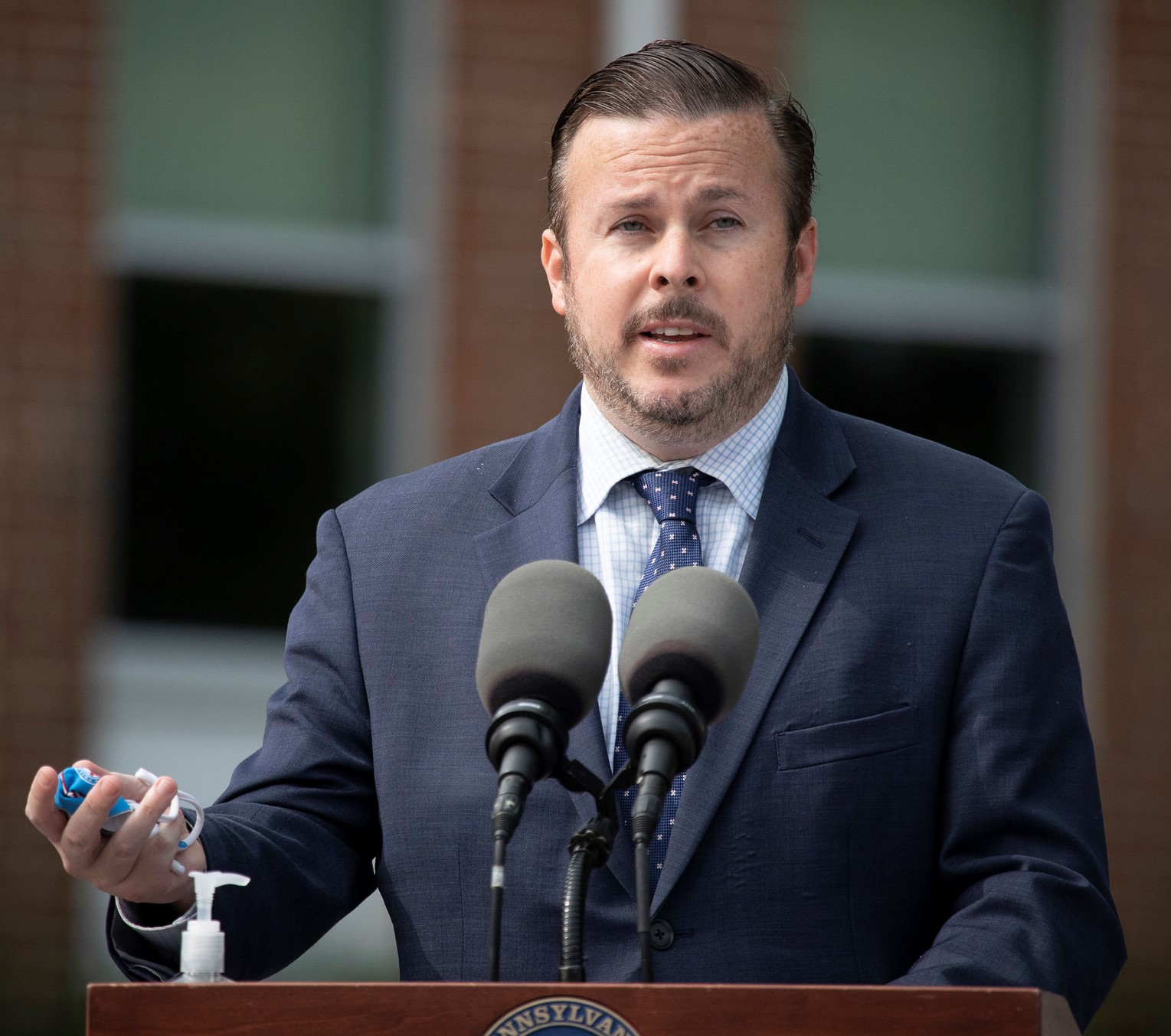

Member of the Pennsylvania House of Representatives from the 172nd district
- In office January 4, 2011 – November 30, 2024
- Preceded by: John Perzel
- Succeeded by: Sean Dougherty

Personal details
- Born: February 7, 1980 (age 46) Philadelphia, Pennsylvania, U.S.
- Party: Democratic
- Education: La Salle University; Harvard University
- Website: Official website

Kevin J. Boyle (born February 7, 1980) is an American politician who served as a member of the Pennsylvania House of Representatives for the 172nd district from 2011 to 2024.

Boyle was elected to the House of Representatives in November 2010 when he ran against 32-year incumbent and former Speaker of the Pennsylvania House John Perzel. Boyle is the younger brother of United States Representative Brendan F. Boyle and together they are the only set of brothers to serve simultaneously in Pennsylvania's House of Representatives in its 300-year history.

== Early life ==
Boyle is the son of Francis Boyle, an Irish immigrant who came to America at age 19, and Eileen Boyle, a first generation Irish American who worked as a school crossing guard. He grew up in a row home in the Olney section of Philadelphia, where he was raised by his pro-union working-class parents. He graduated from Cardinal Dougherty High School in 1998 and graduated with honors from La Salle University in 2002, where he received his B.A. in political science. He went on to earn a master's degree from Harvard University. While at Harvard University where he earned his master's degree in education, Boyle researched urban education issues, school funding streams, and strategies to expand access to higher education. Much of his research was included in the "Reach Scholarship" bill that his brother, Rep. Brendan Boyle, and then-Rep. Tony Payton introduced in the House in 2009. The goal of the legislation was to provide all Pennsylvania students who demonstrate academic excellence with the opportunity to attend college for free.

After graduating from Harvard, Boyle worked as an advocate for the Alliance for Strong Families and Communities, the nation's second-largest association for family service organizations in Washington, D.C.

== Political career ==
Boyle began his involvement in Philadelphia politics by serving as campaign manager for older brother Brendan's campaigns for the state legislature. In 2007, Kevin became Legislative Director to City Councilman Bill Greenlee, a role Boyle held until 2010 when he stepped down from the job to run his own race for State Representative. Boyle served as Philadelphia Councilman Bill Greenlee's legislative director for three years and helped write some of the city's most impactful new laws. He also worked directly with Councilman Bill Greenlee on the ban prohibiting driving while operating a hand-held cell phone or other electronic devices.

In 2010, Boyle entered a three-way Democratic Primary in the 172nd state legislative district. The other two candidates were Democratic activist Tim Kearney and school teacher and community activist, Daniel Collins. He accused Collins's younger sister of submitting forged signatures to have his name on the ballot. Boyle's accusations were unfounded against Lauren Collins, who at that time was 8 months pregnant. Boyle finished first, beating both of his opponents by 30-point margins. In the general election, he faced former Speaker of the House John Perzel, who was seeking re-election despite his involvement in the "Bonusgate" scandal. Boyle won the election against Perzel, capturing 53.8% to Perzel's 46.1%. It was a significant upset that bucked the strong Republican winds blowing in 2010. Boyle was sworn in as the Representative from the 172nd PA House district in January 2011.

In 2012, Boyle was challenged in the Democratic Primary. His opponent was once again Daniel Collins, who was endorsed by the Philadelphia FOP and many other city unions. Boyle again defeated Collins, winning 66% of the vote to Collins' 34%. In the general election, Boyle faced Republican Al Taubenberger. Boyle easily won re-election, defeating Taubenberger 68% to 32%. He has been re-elected by an overwhelming majority of voters in each election since.

In 2019, Boyle was appointed the minority Chairperson of the House State Government committee.

Boyle introduced legislation limiting the size of firearm magazines one may carry or sell, as well as for background checks for those who sell firearms. He is the prime sponsor on legislation that would expand the state's Hate Crimes Law, so that it would include protections for the LGBTQ community. More recently, Boyle's legislation to give emergency vehicle designation to Philadelphia Prison System Transport Units was signed into law by the governor.

In the 2019-2020 session, Boyle succeeded as House State Government Committee Chairperson in working across the aisle to pass much-needed election related reforms.

In 2020, Boyle has worked as Chairperson of the House State Government Committee to prevent the Republican House and Senate majority from ending COVID-19 related health and safety measures, and to require CDC and Department of Health guidelines be instituted to protect workers and citizens.

In 2021 in an interview with a Northern Irish newspaper Boyle refused to condemn all sectarian terrorist attacks in Northern Ireland.

In the Tuesday, April 23, 2024, Pennsylvania Primary Election, Boyle was defeated in the Democratic Primary election by challenger Sean Dougherty. Dougherty garnered 72.52% of the vote to Boyle's 26.86%.

== Personal life ==
The Philadelphia Daily News selected Boyle for its list of rising political stars within Philadelphia. Kevin's brother, Brendan, was also selected for the list. In 2012 the Community College of Philadelphia awarded Kevin for his community leadership.

Boyle lives in the Fox Chase neighborhood of Philadelphia. Boyle is active in local civic organizations throughout Northeast Philadelphia.

On September 25, 2021, Boyle was arrested and charged with harassment and violation of a protection from abuse order that was filed by his wife. Following the arrest, Governor Tom Wolf and Republican House leaders called for Boyle's resignation, while House Democratic leaders defended him by saying that Boyle agreed to undergo evaluation for "ongoing mental health challenges". In a letter to constituents before the 2022 primary, Boyle attributed this incident to psychosis, which he believes was caused by an adverse reaction to the Adderall he takes to treat his attention deficit hyperactivity disorder (ADHD). On April 16, 2024, the Philadelphia Inquirer reported that an arrest warrant was issued for Boyle for allegedly violating the protective order. The paper later reported a week later that the arrest warrant was withdrawn.

On February 9, 2024, a video surfaced on social media depicting Boyle berating employees at a bar located just outside his district. Boyle accused bar staff and patrons of being members of military intelligence. House Democratic leaders said that Boyle was seeking help following the outburst.
