= Diocese of Fairbanks =

Latin Catholic jurisdiction in the US

Coordinates: 64°50′04″N 147°47′09″W

Diocese of Fairbanks Dioecesis de Fairbanks
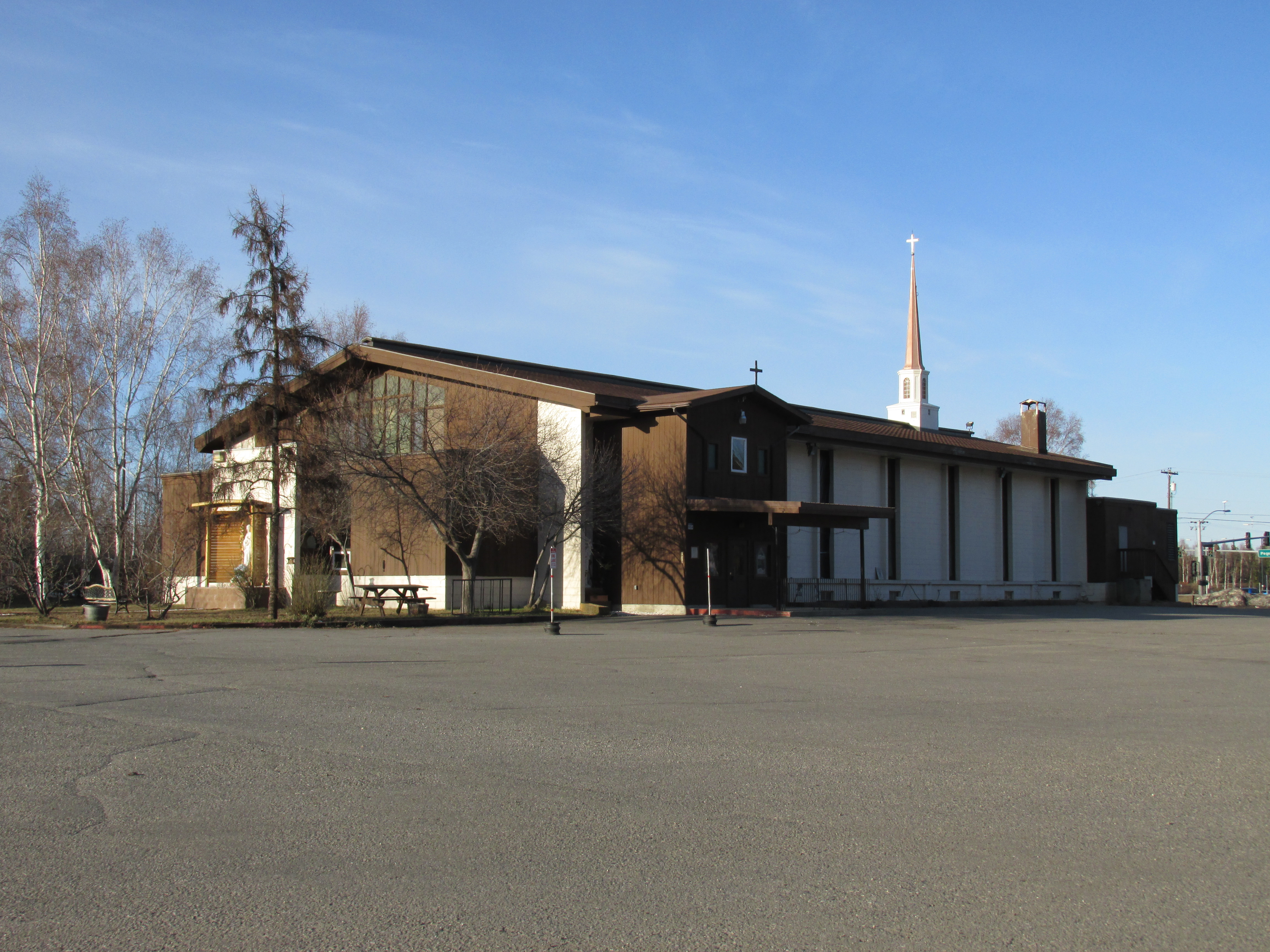
- Sacred Heart Cathedral

- Coat of arms

Location
- Country: United States
- Territory: Northern Alaska
- Ecclesiastical province: Anchorage-Juneau

Statistics
- Area: 409,849 sq mi (1,061,500 km^{2})
- Population: Total; Catholics: (as of 2016); 167,544; 12,475 (7.4%)
- Parishes: 46

Information
- Denomination: Catholic
- Sui iuris church: Latin Church
- Rite: Roman Rite
- Established: August 8, 1962; 64 years ago
- Cathedral: Sacred Heart Cathedral
- Patron saint: St. Therese of Lisieux

Current leadership
- Pope: Leo XIV
- Bishop: Steven Maekawa, O.P.
- Metropolitan Archbishop: Andrew E. Bellisario

Map
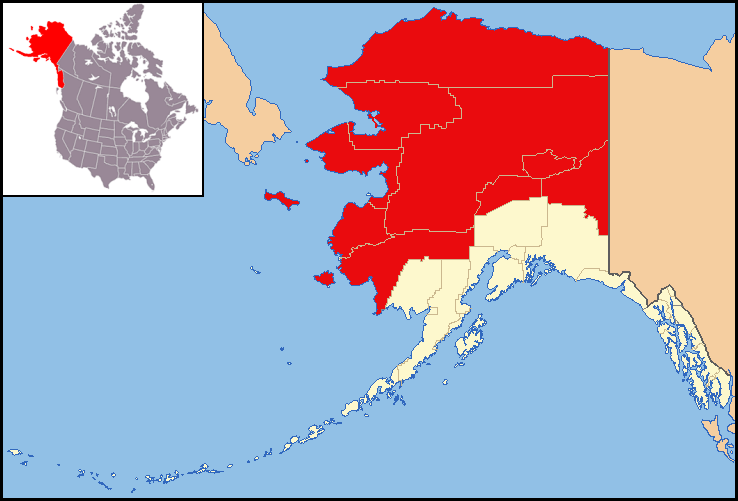

Website
- dioceseoffairbanks.org

The Diocese of Fairbanks (Latin: Dioecesis de Fairbanks) is a diocese of the Catholic Church in the northern part of the state of Alaska and geographically the largest diocese in the United States. The mother church is the Sacred Heart Cathedral in Fairbanks. The bishop is Steven Maekawa.

== History ==
=== 1867 to 1900 ===
When the United States purchased Alaska in 1867 from the Empire of Russia, it was under the jurisdiction of the Diocese of Vancouver Island in Canada. Bishop Charles Seghers of that diocese made several missionary trips to Alaska during the early 1870s. He later sent John Althoff, a Dutch priest, to create missions in Wrangell, Alaska, the Cassiar mining district on the Stikine River, and the former Russian capital of Sitka, Alaska. Althoff established the first permanent Catholic presence in Alaska when he founded Saint Rose of Lima Parish in Wrangell on May 3, 1879. After the discovery of gold near Juneau, Alaska, Althoff moved there. He celebrated the first mass and baptism in Juneau in an interdenominational "Log Cabin Church" on July 17, 1882.

In May 1886, Seghers was murdered by a traveling companion near Nulato, Alaska, while on a missionary trip. After learning of Segher's death, Pascal Tosi of the Society of Jesus unilaterally took control of the Alaska missions. Later that summer in the Pacific Northwest of the United States, the Jesuit superior of the Rocky Mountain Mission, Joseph M. Cataldo, appointed Tosi as superior of the Alaska mission.

On July 27, 1894, Pope Leo XIII erected the Prefecture Apostolic of Alaska. He transferred all of Alaska from the Canadian Dioceses of Vancouver Island and New Westminster and appointed Tosi as the prefect apostolic. Due to poor health, Tosi was forced to resign in 1897; Leo XIII replaced him with Jean-Baptiste René from the Society of Jesus.

=== 1900 to 1951 ===
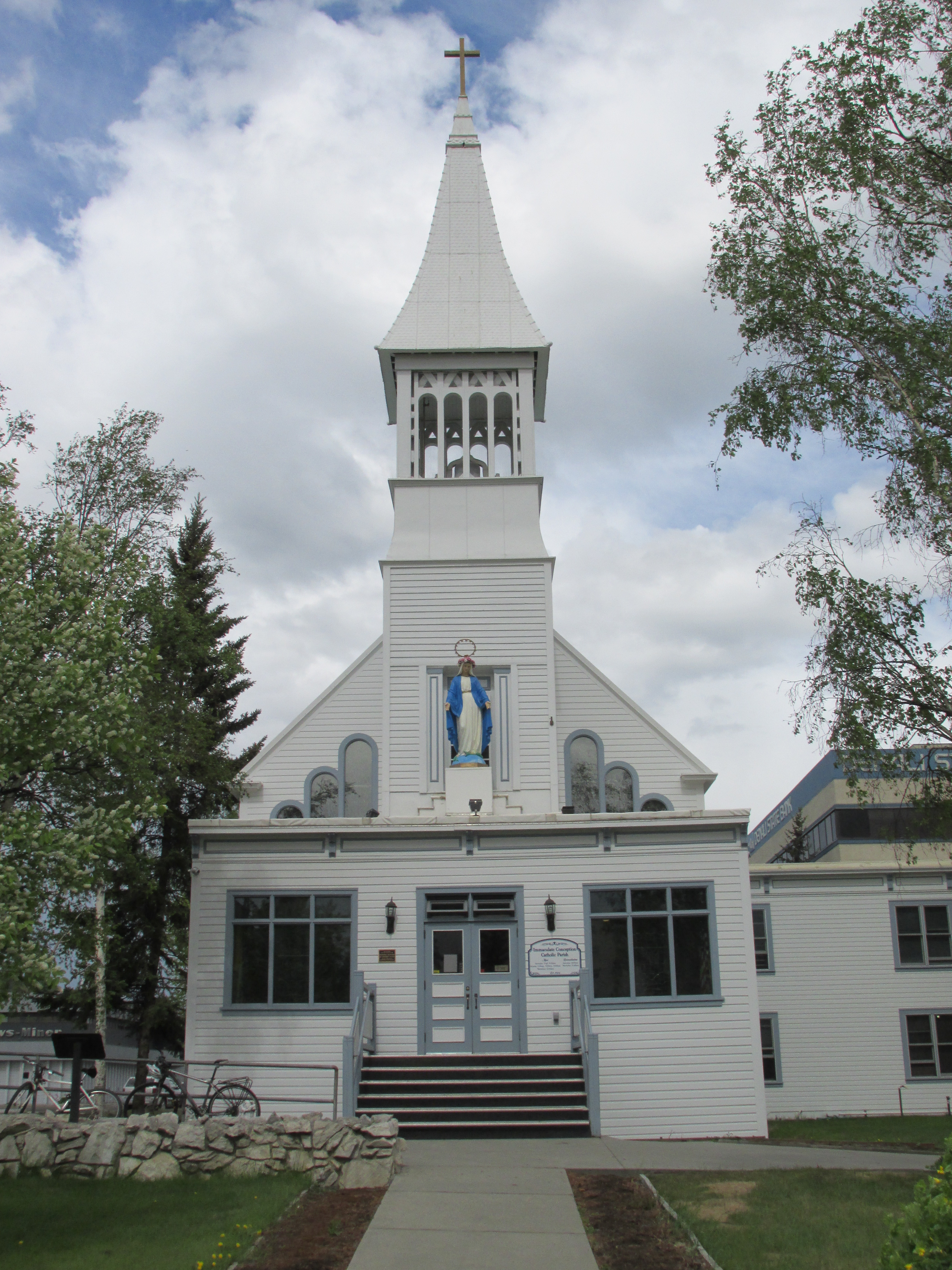
Immaculate Conception Church, Fairbanks, Alaska (2014)

When Rene resigned in 1904, Pope Pius X named Joseph Crimont of the Society of Jesus as what would be the last prefect apostolic.

The first church in the Alaskan interior was Immaculate Conception Church in 1904, built two years after the establishment of Fairbanks as a trading post. Father Francis Monroe raised $3,000 from gold miners to build the structure. In 1906, Monroe conducted fundraising again to construct Saint Joseph's Hospital, the first hospital in Fairbanks. The Sisters of Providence from Montreal, Quebec, came to operate Saint Joseph's in 1910.

On December 22, 1916, Pope Benedict XV elevated the Prefecture Apostolic of Alaska to the Vicariate Apostolic of Alaska. He appointed Crimont as its first vicar apostolic on February 15, 1917, and made him a bishop. In 1948, Pope Pius XII appointed Francis Gleeson of the Society of Jesus to lead the vicariate.

=== 1951 to 2000 ===
On June 23, 1951, Pope Pius XII erected the Diocese of Juneau. He dissolved the existing vicariate and moved all of southern Alaska into the new diocese. The remainder of the state became the new Vicariate of Northern Alaska, with its episcopal see in Fairbanks. Pius XII appointed Gleeson as bishop of the new vicariate.

In 1962, Pope John XXIII suppressed the Vicariate of Northern Alaska and replaced it with the new Diocese of Fairbanks, with Gleeson as its first bishop. In 1966, Pope Paul VI erected the Archdiocese of Anchorage and assigned the Diocese of Fairbanks to it as a suffragan. To assist Gleeson, Paul VI named Robert Whelan of the Society of Jesus as coadjutor bishop of the diocese in 1967.

After Gleeson retired in 1968, Whelan succeeded him as bishop. In 1969, Bishop Whelan granted the request for Joseph Lundowski, a lay volunteer, to officially distribute communion at St. Michael's Parish in a remote Alaskan village. Previously, in 1964, Vicar General John E. Gurr had received a letter from a priest who complained that Lundowski was sexually abusing minors in his parish but Gurr allegedly took no action. Lundowski left the village after being accused of molesting a young boy. Whelan established the Native Diaconate Program, ordaining 28 Native Alaskan men to the permanent diaconate. Michael Kaniecki of the Society of Jesus was made coadjutor bishop in 1984. Whelan's resignation as bishop of Fairbanks was accepted by the pope in 1985, and Kaniecki succeeded him.

=== 2000 to present ===
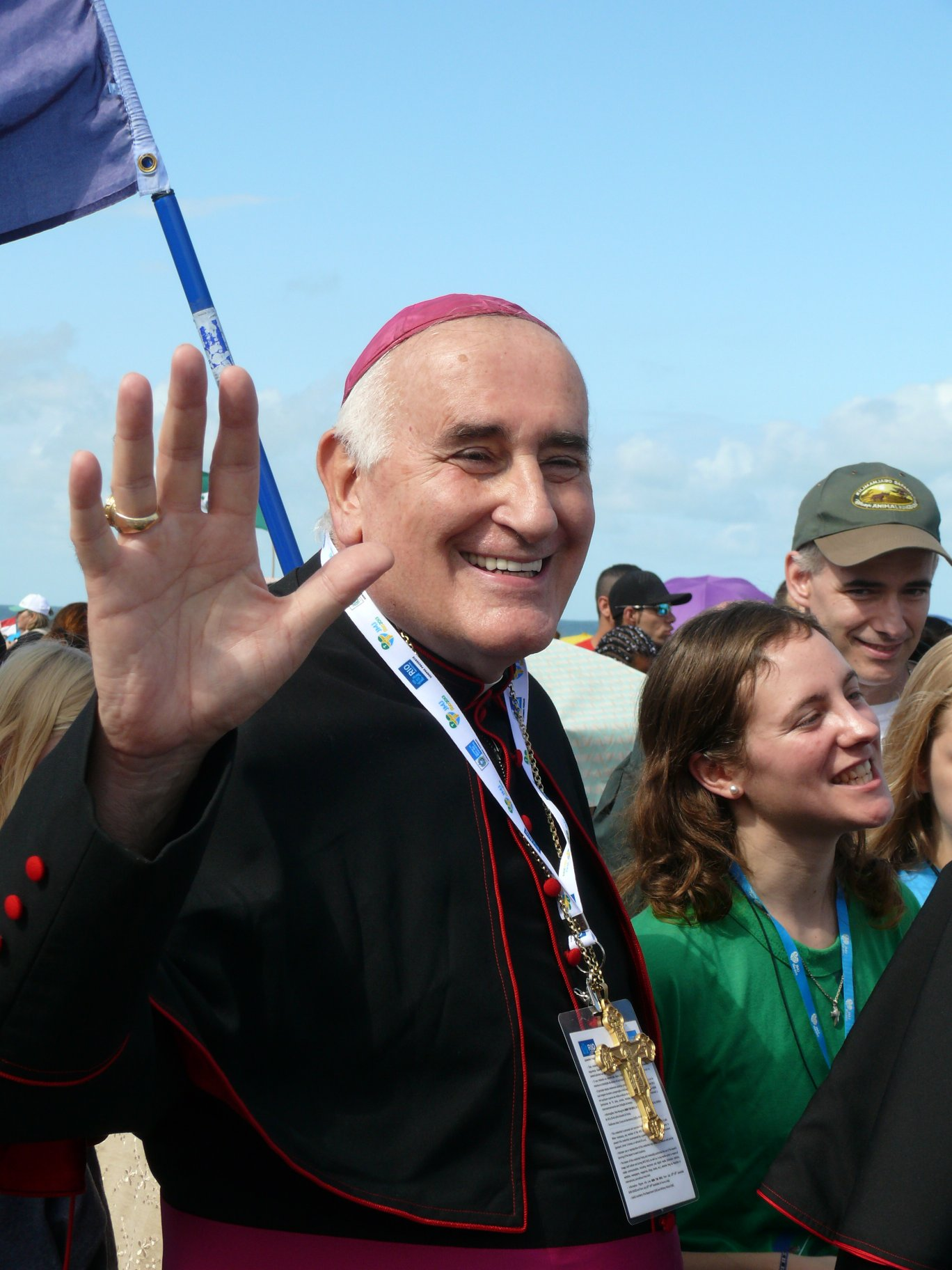
Bishop Kettler (2013)

Kaniecki died suddenly in 2000. In 2002, John Paul II appointed Donald Kettler of the Diocese of Sioux Falls as the first non-Jesuit bishop of Fairbanks. Pope Benedict XVI appointed Kettler as bishop of the Diocese of St. Cloud in 2013 and replaced him in Alaska with Chad Zielinski from the Archdiocese for the Military Services.

In February 2008, the diocese announced plans to file for Chapter 11 bankruptcy, citing an inability to pay settlements to the 140 plaintiffs who had filed claims for sexual abuse by priests or church workers. The Society of Jesus, Oregon Province, was named as a co-defendant in the case, and settled for $50 million. The diocese, which reported an operating budget then of approximately $6 million, claimed that one of the diocese's insurance carriers failed to "participate meaningfully". When the diocese filed for bankruptcy in 2012, it acknowledged that reports of abuse spanned "over the last six decades." Over time, the diocese's list of "credibly accused" clergy grew as well.

In 2019, the Vatican removed the Diocese of Fairbanks from its list of missionary dioceses, transferring control of the diocese from the Congregation for the Evangelization of Peoples to the Congregation for Bishops. Zielinski said that he hoped the move would help the shortage of priests in the diocese. At the time of that announcement, the diocese had only 17 priests to staff 46 parishes and missions.

On September 17, 2020, Pope Francis suppressed the Archdiocese of Anchorage and the Diocese of Juneau and erected the Archdiocese of Anchorage-Juneau. He designated the Diocese of Fairbanks as the only suffragan of the new archdiocese. Francis appointed Zielinksi in 2022 as bishop of the Diocese of New Ulm. In 2023, Francis appointed Steven Maekawa, a Dominican priest of the province of the Most Holy Name of Jesus, as the sixth bishop of Fairbanks. Maekawa was previously the pastor of the Holy Family Old Cathedral in Anchorage.

== Bishops and other ordinaries ==
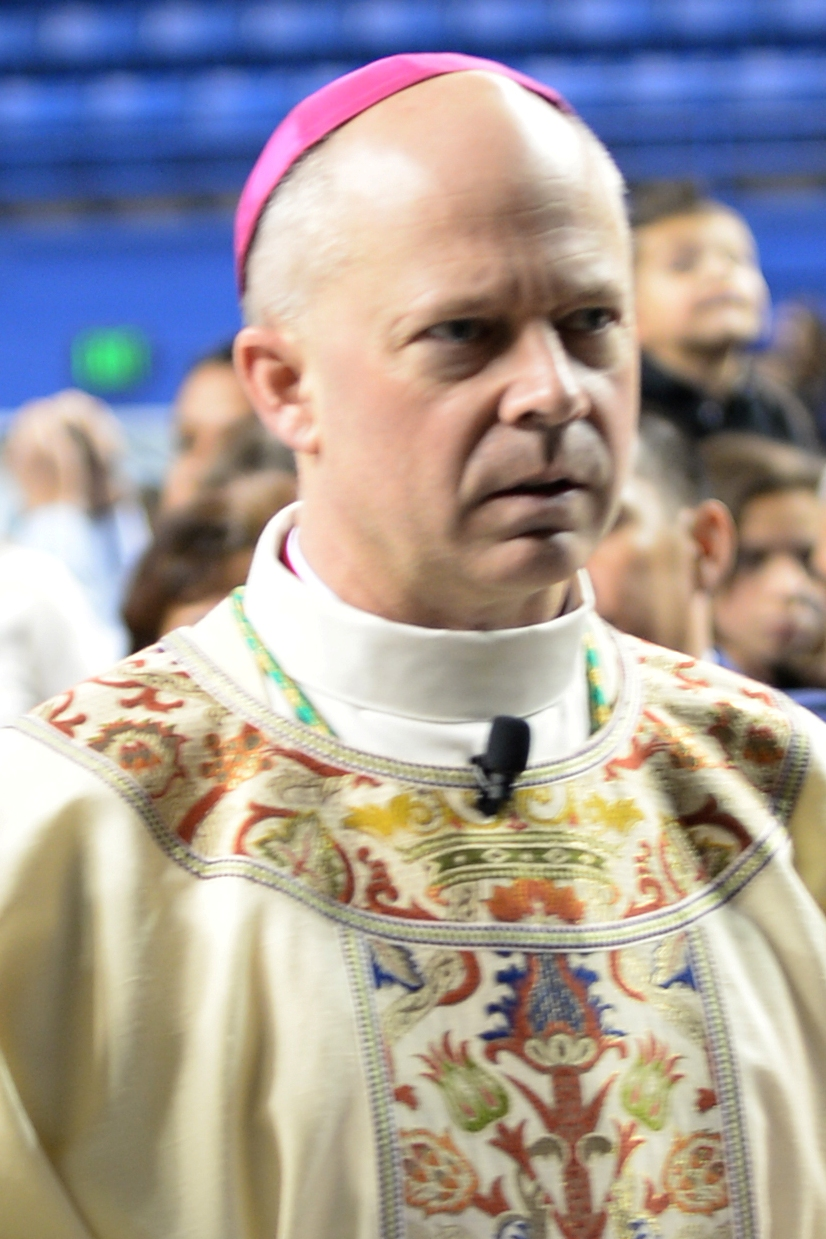
Bishop Zielinski (2014)

=== Prefects Apostolic of Alaska ===
1. Pascal Tosi (1894–1897)
2. Jean-Baptiste René (1897–1904)
3. Joseph Raphael John Crimont (1904–1917), appointed Vicar Apostolic of Alaska

=== Vicars Apostolic of Alaska ===
1. Joseph Raphael John Crimont (1917–1945)
2. Walter James Fitzgerald (1945–1947; Coadjutor Vicar Apostolic 1939–1945)
3. Francis Doyle Gleeson (1948–1951), title changed to Vicar Apostolic of Northern Alaska

=== Vicar Apostolic of Northern Alaska ===
- Francis Doyle Gleeson (1951-1962); Appointed first Bishop of Fairbanks

=== Bishops of Fairbanks ===
1. Francis Doyle Gleeson (1962–1968)
  - George Theodore Boileau (Coadjutor Bishop 1964–1965), died before succession
2. Robert Louis Whelan (1968–1985; coadjutor bishop 1968)
3. Michael Joseph Kaniecki (1985–2000; coadjutor bishop 1984-1985)
4. Donald Joseph Kettler (2002–2013), appointed Bishop of Saint Cloud
5. Chad William Zielinski (2014–2022), appointed Bishop of New Ulm
6. Steven Maekawa, O.P. (2023–present)

=== Other priest of the Vicariate of Alaska who became a bishop ===
Robert Dermot O'Flanagan, appointed Bishop of Juneau in 1951

== Education ==
- Immaculate Conception Elementary, Fairbanks
- Monroe Catholic High School, Fairbanks

== Media ==
- The Alaskan Shepherd, a diocesan newsletter
- KNOM radio. Established in 1971, KNOM is the oldest Catholic radio station in the country.
- KQHE radio. Established in 2012.
