= John Perzel =

American politician (born 1950)

Member of the Pennsylvania House of Representatives from the 172nd district
- In office January 2, 1979 – November 30, 2010
- Preceded by: Francis Gleeson
- Succeeded by: Kevin Boyle

85th Speaker of the Pennsylvania House of Representatives
- In office March 29, 2003 – November 30, 2006
- Preceded by: Matt Ryan
- Succeeded by: Dennis O'Brien

Republican Leader of the Pennsylvania House of Representatives
- In office January 5, 1995 – January 7, 2003
- Preceded by: Matt Ryan
- Succeeded by: Sam Smith

Republican Whip of the Pennsylvania House of Representatives
- In office January 3, 1989 – November 30, 1994
- Preceded by: Samuel Hayes
- Succeeded by: John Barley

Personal details
- Born: January 7, 1950 (age 76) Philadelphia, Pennsylvania, U.S.
- Party: Republican
- Spouse: Sheryl Stokes

John Michael Perzel (born January 7, 1950) is an American politician and member of the Republican Party. Perzel represented 172nd Legislative District (Northeast Philadelphia) in the Pennsylvania House of Representatives from 1978 until 2010. From April 2003 to January 2007, he served as House Speaker. He lost his bid for re-election to Democrat Kevin Boyle in 2010. Perzel was convicted in August 2011 of a variety of corruption related charges and, in March 2012, was sentenced to 30 months in prison.

== Early years ==
Perzel is a graduate of Abraham Lincoln High School. He earned a bachelor's degree in 1975 from Troy State University in Alabama. After graduating from university, he returned to Philadelphia and became a waiter. Immediately before his political career, he was maitre d' at Pavio's Restaurant in Somerton, a section of Northeast Philadelphia.

== Politics ==
Perzel was noticed by Philadelphia Republican boss Billy Meehan, who selected him to be a GOP committeeman in 1972.

In 1976, after graduating from Troy State University, he unsuccessfully ran for a seat in the House. In 1978, he made a successful campaign for the House, focusing on the poor attendance record of the Democratic incumbent, Francis Gleeson. Over the years, he rose in seniority in the House, holding the offices of Republican Whip, Policy Committee Chairman and Chairman of the House Republican Campaign Committee. He was elected Majority Leader in 1994.

Perzel hit some bumps on his route to the leadership. In November 2000, Perzel nearly suffered defeat when a wave of support for then-Vice President Al Gore brought out Democratic voters in Philadelphia in larger than expected numbers. Perzel survived by less than 100 votes. 2002 brought redistricting and a more favorable district for Perzel.

In a 2002 PoliticsPA Feature story designating politicians with yearbook superlatives, he was named the "Hardest Working." In 2001, he was named "Politician of the Year" by PoliticsPA. Perzel was appointed as a commissioner to the Delaware River Port Authority by Democratic Governor Ed Rendell in 2003.

On November 2, 2010, Perzel lost his seat to Democrat Kevin Boyle, brother of Rep. Brendan Boyle. Perzel captured 46% of the vote to Boyle's 54%. Perzel was the only Republican incumbent in Pennsylvania to lose in the 2010 elections.

== Speakership ==
On March 29, 2003, Speaker of the House, Matt Ryan, died after battling cancer. On April 15, 2003, the House elected Perzel as Speaker. He became one of the most powerful legislative leaders in the Pennsylvania General Assembly since James Manderino.

Perzel was instrumental in the state takeover of the poorly performing School District of Philadelphia, the Philadelphia Parking Authority, and the Philadelphia Convention Center.

He was also a key figure in the 2005 pay raise debacle. During the furor, Perzel became the butt of jokes due to an unfortunate photograph. While reading to students in Pittsburgh, he was photographed in front of a class display full of pink pigs. The pay raise opposition had used a 25-foot pink pig in its demonstrations, and the photograph was widely circulated in order to embarrass the Speaker. In defending the pay raise, Perzel has made a number of controversial statements, including assertions that some cow-milkers and tattoo artists earned more than his members. In addition, Perzel has commented that some of the members were unable to obtain credit cards.

Perzel has been criticized by conservatives for compromising with fellow Philadelphian, Governor Ed Rendell. Perzel supported the 2003 tax increase proposed by Rendell as well as Act 71, the law that legalized slot machine gambling in Pennsylvania.

=== 2007 Speaker election ===
Republicans lost the majority in the 2006 elections by one seat. Perzel sought to convince a Democrat to change parties or abstain from the election for speaker so that he could remain in office. After Democrat Tom Caltagirone of Reading announced that he would support Perzel rather than Democrat Bill DeWeese for Speaker, it appeared likely that Perzel would be elected Speaker presiding over a Democratic majority. At the last minute, however, DeWeese nominated another Northeast Philadelphia Republican, Dennis O'Brien. The tactic was successful, as O'Brien was elected by a vote of 105 to 97.

The Republican caucus created the new title of Speaker Emeritus which gave Perzel a role without displacing other members of the House leadership.

Even though he lost the majority of his power, he remained a "powerful force in the House due to his institutional knowledge."

Perzel made a bid to return to the House GOP leadership after the 2008 elections, but was defeated by incumbent Sam Smith for the position of Minority Leader.

== Aristotle scandal ==
On September 10, 2008 the office of then-State Attorney General Republican Tom Corbett announced that Perzel was under investigation for deals he made with the data firm Aristotle, Inc. during his tenure as Speaker of the House. Perzel had contracted the firm to provide the Republican Caucus with its constituency service program in deals worth over $1,870,000. Corbett's agents were investigating whether the sophisticated data collection software was used for reelection campaigns in violation of state laws against the use of public funds for campaign purposes. On September 11, 2008 the Pittsburgh Post-Gazette reported that the contract contained specific references for gathering information related to election purposes and the distribution of yard signs.

The Republican Attorney General's office stated that it would issue indictments either before October 1, 2009 or after the election to avoid having "undue influence" on the November election. After indictment, Perzel turned himself into local police on November 13, 2009. and was released from custody on $100,000 bond that same day after surrendering his passport. He lost his 2010 re-election bid to Democrat Kevin Boyle.

Perzel pleaded guilty on August 31, 2011 to eight criminal charges, including two counts of conflict of interest, two counts of theft, and four counts of conspiracy. On March 21, 2012, Common Pleas Court Judge Richard Lewis sentenced Perzel to 30 months in prison and to pay one million dollars restitution to the state. The penalty of one million dollars was later dropped on appeal.

== Ward leader ==
Perzel was the Republican Ward Leader of the 64th Ward Republican Executive Committee.

== See also ==
- List of Pennsylvania state legislatures
