= Pascal Tosi =

Italian Jesuit and missionary

Pasquale Tosi SJ (27 April 1837 – 14 January 1898), known in English as Pascal Tosi, was an Italian Jesuit missionary and co-founder of the Alaskan mission.

He was one of the first two Jesuits missionaries (the other being Louis Robaut) to set foot in Alaska. As the first Superior of the Jesuits in Alaska (from 1886 to 1897) and first to have ecclesiastical jurisdiction in Alaska (Prefect Apostolic from 1894 to 1897), he is regarded as the founder and organizer of the Church in North-Alaska.

== Early life and Northwest mission ==
Tosi was born on 27 April 1837 in San Vito, a village near Santarcangelo di Romagna in northern Italy. He studied at the seminary in Bertinoro. Ordained a (diocesan) priest in 1861, Tosi entered the Society of Jesus in 1862.

In 1865, he arrived in the United States to serve on the Rocky Mountain Mission. Tosi spent almost twenty years serving the indigenous peoples of Colville and Cheney, in the state of Washington, and Coeur d'Alène, Idaho.

== Alaskan mission ==
In 1886, Tosi and a French Jesuit, Louis Robaut, were commissioned to accompany Charles John Seghers, Archbishop of Victoria, on the first missionary expedition to northern Alaska. The two Jesuits were supposed to stay with the archbishop only on a temporary basis: the Society had no intention of opening a new field of missionary activity in Alaska.

Tosi and Robaut spent the winter of 1886-87 in Canada at the confluence of the Yukon and Stewart rivers. In November 1886, Seghers was murdered by his guide, for unclear reasons, near Nulato. Tosi and Robaut learned of Seghers' murder upon their entry into Alaska in early 1887. Tosi then founded the first Jesuit mission in Alaska.

The following summer, he made a trip to the Pacific Northwest to consult with the Superior of the Rocky Mountain Mission, Joseph M. Cataldo SJ, who formally appointed him Superior of the Alaska Mission and entrusted him with the task of developing that mission.

In 1892, Pope Leo XIII was moved by an audience with Tosi in Rome, and told him to "go and make yourself the pope in those regions!" In 1893, Tosi returned to Italy to find help for his mission. On July 27, 1894, the Holy See separated Alaska from the Diocese of Vancouver Island and made it a Prefecture Apostolic with Tosi as its Apostolic Prefect.

By 1897, Tosi was physically worn out by a tough daily life and strenuous labours in an extreme climate. He was succeeded both as Superior of the Alaska Mission and as Prefect Apostolic in March 1897 by French Jesuit Jean-Baptiste René.

== Death ==
On September 13, 1897, Tosi sailed reluctantly from St. Michael for a short rest in Juneau. As the ship left the harbour, a four-gun salute demonstrated the esteem in which Tosi was held. On January 14, 1898, he died of a heart attack in Juneau.

Juneau's Alaska News said of Tosi:

Of all those who have traveled Alaska, it can be frankly stated that none traveled as much in every direction as Father Tosi, Apostolic Prefect of Alaska. During his twelve-year sojourn in the Yukon Valley, he walked thousands upon thousands of miles over territory never before trodden by humans.

— Alaska News, February 1896

== Bibliography ==
- LLORENTE, S.: Jesuits in Alaska, Portland, 1969.
- TESTORE, C.: Nella terra del sole a mezzanotte. La fondazione delle missione di Alaska. P. Pasquale Tosi S.J., Venice, 1935.
- ZAVATTI, S., Missionario ed esploratore nell'Alaska: Padre Pasquale Tosi, S.I., Milan, 1950.
