= Northwest Commission on Colleges and Universities =

University accreditation organization in the U.S.

- NWCCU logo

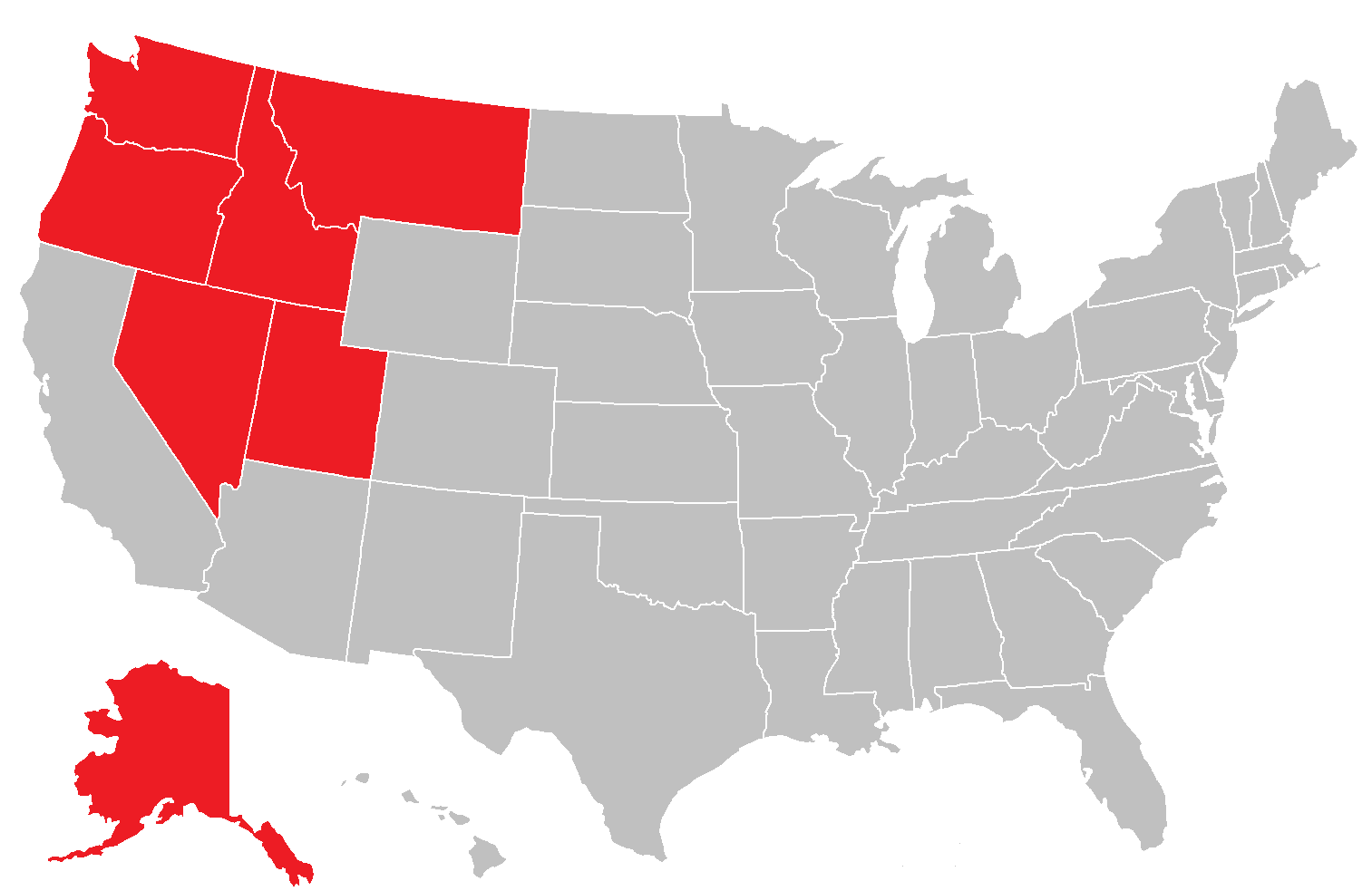
- Historical NWCCU operational area
- Abbreviation: NWCCU
- Formation: 1917
- Legal status: Association
- Purpose: Educational accreditation
- Headquarters: Redmond, Washington
- Region served: Alaska, Idaho, Montana, Nevada, Oregon, Utah, Washington, British Columbia
- Members: 163 institutions
- President: Dr. Selena Grace
- Main organ: Board of Commissioners
- Website: nwccu.org

The Northwest Commission on Colleges and Universities (NWCCU) is an independent, non-profit membership organization recognized by the United States Department of Education since 1952 as an institutional accreditor for colleges and universities.

== Scope ==
Before 2020, when the Department of Education reorganized accreditation, NWCCU was the regional authority on educational quality and institutional effectiveness of higher education institutions in the seven-state Northwest region of Alaska, Idaho, Montana, Nevada, Oregon, Utah, and Washington. It establishes accreditation criteria and evaluation procedures by which institutions are reviewed. The commission is recognized by the Council for Higher Education Accreditation.

The Commission oversees regional accreditation for 156 institutions. Its decision-making body consists of up to twenty-six Commissioners who represent the public and the diversity of higher education institutions within the Northwest region.

The NWCCU also accredits non-US institutions. Capilano University, Simon Fraser University, and Thompson Rivers University of British Columbia, Canada, received accreditation in 2013, 2015, and 2018, respectively. However, as of 1 April 2024, Capilano University is no longer accredited by NWCCU.

== History ==
In 1917, the organization was formed as the Northwest Association of Secondary and Higher Schools.

In 1974, the association changed its name to the Northwest Association of Schools and Colleges, which included two divisions, one being the Northwest Association of Colleges and Universities.

In 2002, the Northwest Association of Colleges and Universities split from the Northwest Association of Accredited Schools (NWAAS) to create two separate organizations, changing the name of the organization to the Northwest Commission on Colleges and Universities (NWCCU). NWCCU has since handled the accreditation of institutions of higher education, while the Northwest Association of Accredited Schools (NWAAS) handled the accreditation of primary and secondary schools.

In 2012, NWAC merged with AdvancED.

In 2025, NWCCU announced Dr. Selena Grace as its new president and CEO.

== See also ==
- List of recognized accreditation associations of higher learning
- Regional accreditation
- School accreditation
- United States Department of Education
