= Sean Dougherty (politician) =

American politician

Member of the Pennsylvania House of Representatives from the 172nd district
- Incumbent
- Assumed office January 7, 2025
- Preceded by: Kevin Boyle

Personal details
- Born: c. 1994
- Party: Democratic
- Relatives: Kevin Dougherty (father); Johnny Dougherty (uncle)
- Education: Temple University Beasley School of Law

Sean Michael Doughtery (born c. 1994) is an American politician who is the current representative for the 172nd district in the Pennsylvania House of Representatives since 2025. He is a member of the Democratic Party.

== Early life and education ==
While attending Chestnut Hill College, Dougherty worked summers between 2013 and 2016 at the International Brotherhood of Electrical Workers Local 98, where his uncle Johnny Dougherty was business manager. In 2023, Johnny Doughtery was tried and convicted of embezzling money from Local 98, and prosecutors alleged some of the money went to his family members (including Sean), but was disguised as payments for time they didn't actually work.

Dougherty graduated from Temple University Beasley School of Law in 2019 and clerked for Judge Dan McCaffery.

== Political career ==
In 2024, Doughtery quit his job as an assistant Philadelphia public defender after being recruited by the Democratic Party to wage a primary challenge against incumbent state representative Kevin Boyle after Boyle faced controversy for an incident where he accosted staff at a local bar. Dougherty would be successful in defeating Boyle in the primary election and defeated Republican candidate Aizaz Gill by a margin of two percent in the general election.

== Electoral history ==
2024 Pennsylvania House of Representatives Democratic primary election, District 172
Party	Candidate	Votes	%
Democratic	Sean Dougherty	3,628	72.47
Democratic	Kevin Boyle (incumbent)	1,347	26.91
Write-in		31	0.62
Total votes		5,006	100.00

2024 Pennsylvania House of Representatives election, District 172
Party	Candidate	Votes	%
Democratic	Sean Dougherty	12,836	50.94
Republican	Aizaz Gill	12,340	48.97
Write-in		23	0.09
Total votes		25,199	100.00
