= Michael Joseph Kaniecki =

American prelate

His Excellency, The Most Reverend Michael Joseph Kaniecki SJ
- Bishop of Fairbanks
- See: Diocese of Fairbanks
- Quashed: May 1, 1984 - August 6, 2000
- Predecessor: Robert Louis Whelan
- Successor: Donald Joseph Kettler

Orders
- Ordination: June 5, 1965 by Francis Valentine Allen
- Consecration: May 1, 1984 by Robert Whelan

Personal details
- Born: April 13, 1935 Detroit, Michigan, US
- Died: August 6, 2000 (aged 65) Emmonak, Alaska, US
- Denomination: Roman Catholic

Michael Joseph Kaniecki, SJ (April 13, 1935 – August 6, 2000) was an American prelate of the Roman Catholic Church who served as bishop of the Diocese of Fairbanks in Alaska from 1985 to 2000.

== Biography ==
Michael Kaniecki was born on April 13, 1935, in Detroit, Michigan. He professed religious vows as a Jesuit, and was ordained a priest for the Society of Jesus by Bishop Francis Valentine Allen on June 5, 1965.

=== Coadjutor Bishop and Bishop of Fairbanks ===
On March 8, 1984, Pope John Paul II named Kaniecki to be the coadjutor bishop of the Diocese of Fairbanks. He was consecrated on May 1, 1984, by Bishop Robert Whelan. The co-consecrators were Archbishop Francis Hurley and Bishop Michael Kenny. Kaniecki became bishop of Fairbanks on June 1, 1985, with the resignation of Bishop Whelan; Kaniecki was installed on July 28, 1985.

Kaniecki served the diocese for a total of 16 years. Michael Kaniecki died suddenly on August 6, 2000, of a massive heart attack before celebrating mass in Emmonak, Alaska.

Catholic Church titles
Preceded by Robert Louis Whelan	Bishop of Fairbanks; 1985–2000	Succeeded by Donald Joseph Kettler
