= Ferrières, Somme =

Ferrières
- Commune
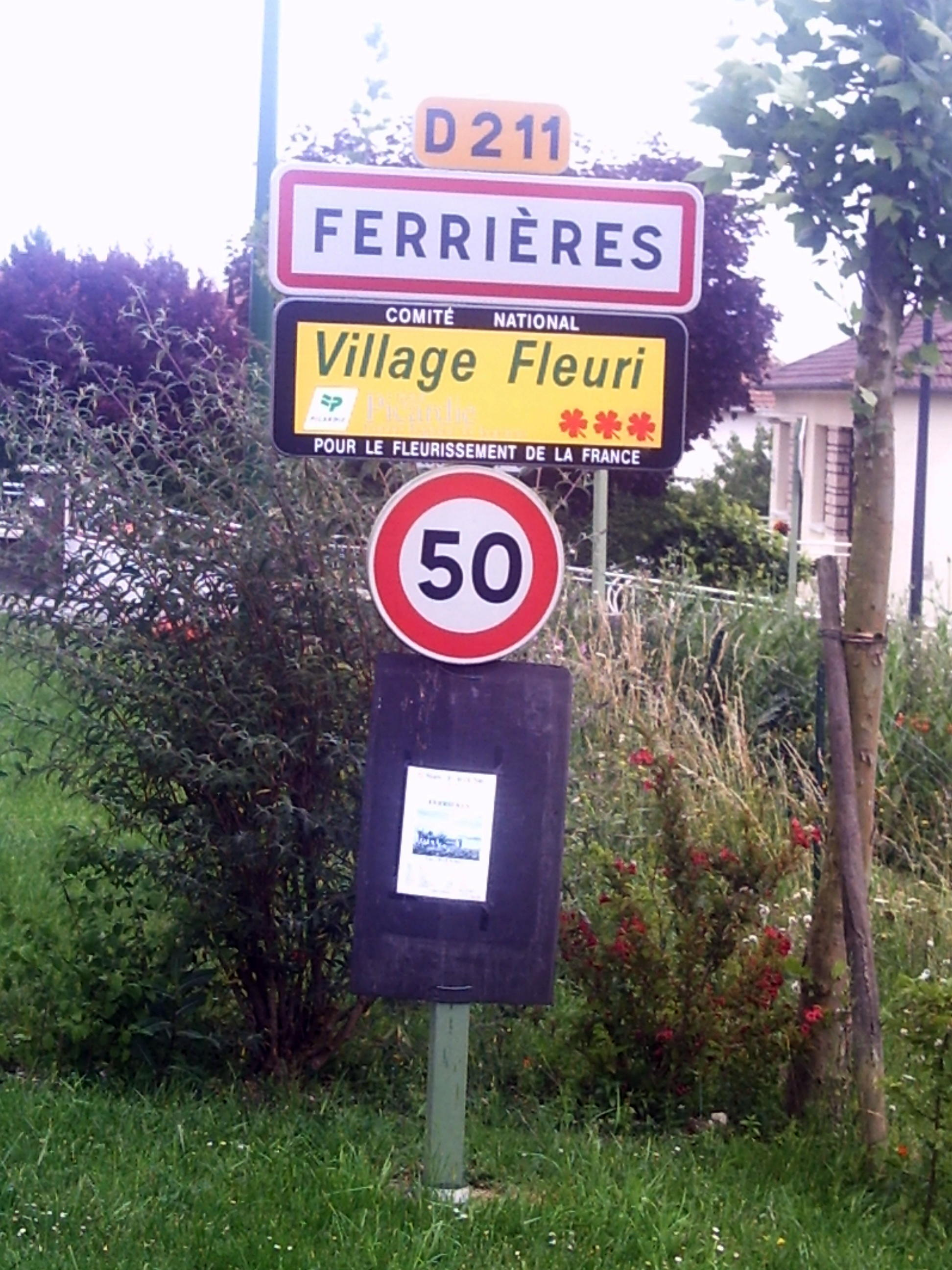
- The entrance to Ferrières
- Location of Ferrières
- Location within France Location within Hauts-de-France
- Coordinates: 49°53′34″N 2°10′41″E
- Country: France
- Region: Hauts-de-France
- Department: Somme
- Arrondissement: Amiens
- Canton: Ailly-sur-Somme
- Intercommunality: CA Amiens Métropole

Government
  - Mayor (2020–2026): Daniel Demaret
- Area^{1}: 3.47 km^{2} (1.34 sq mi)
- Elevation: 110 m (360 ft)
- Highest elevation: 115 m (377 ft)
- Lowest elevation: 59 m (194 ft)
- Population (2023): 496
  - Density: 143/km^{2} (370/sq mi)
- Time zone: UTC+01:00 (CET)
  - Summer (DST): UTC+02:00 (CEST)
- INSEE/Postal code: 80305 /80470
- ^{1} French Land Register data, which excludes lakes, ponds, glaciers > 1 km^{2} (0.386 sq mi or 247 acres) and river estuaries.

Ferrières (French pronunciation: [fɛʁjɛʁ]) is a commune in the Somme department in Hauts-de-France in northern France.

== Geography ==
The commune is situated on the D211 road, some 5 miles (8 km) west of Amiens.

== Population ==
Historical population
Year	Pop.	±% p.a.
1968	252	—
1975	307	+2.86%
1982	315	+0.37%
1990	396	+2.90%
1999	426	+0.81%
2007	467	+1.16%
2012	465	−0.09%
2017	477	+0.51%
2023	496	+0.65%
Source: INSEE

== Places of interest ==
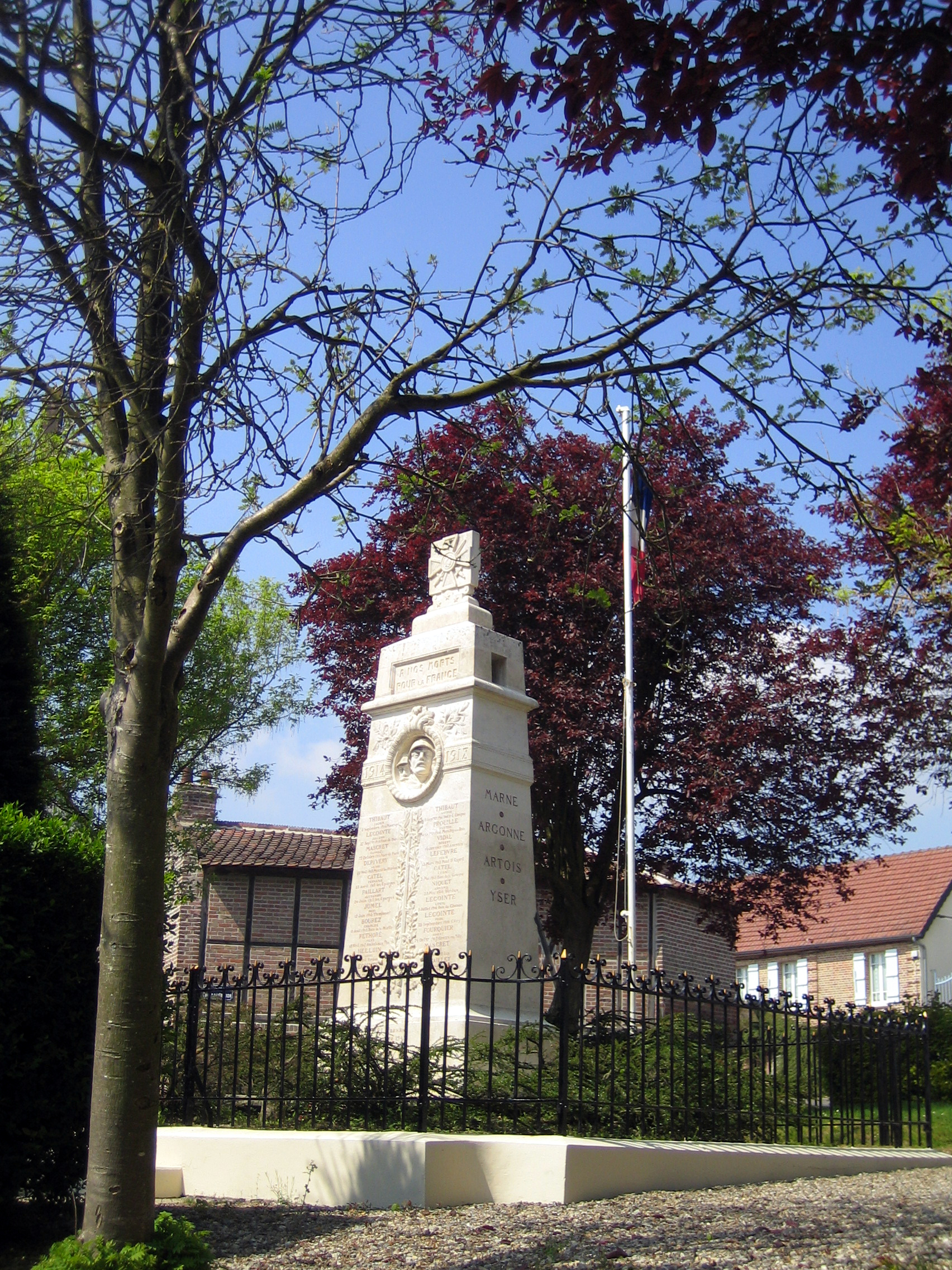
The war memorial

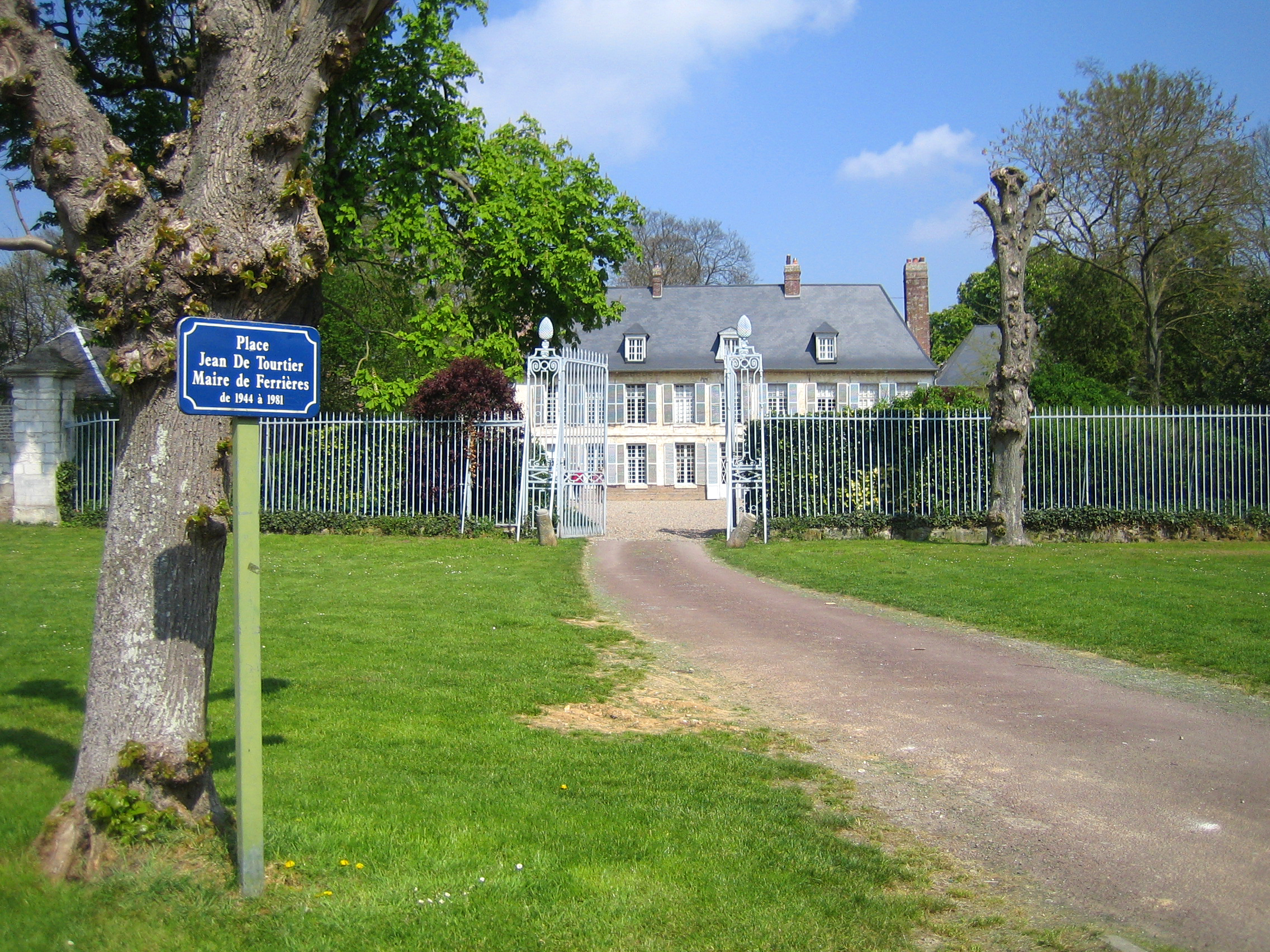
The château

== See also ==
- Communes of the Somme department
