= Tymbrias =

Coordinates: 37.82°N 31.02°E

Tymbrias (Ancient Greek: Τυμβριάς), or Timbrias (Τιμβρίας), or Timbriada (Τιμβρίαδα) or Tymbriada (Τυμβρίαδα) was an ancient city in the Roman province of Pisidia. It stood close to the source of the Eurymedon River in what is now Isparta Province of Turkey, perhaps at the village of Akcaşar.

== Description ==
According to Strabo, Artemidorus Ephesius included Tymbrias in a list of Pisidian cities. Extant inscriptions show that in Roman times it was a fully recognized Greek polis that, for instance, sent embassies to the emperor. It was a member of the Panhellenion league.

In the 2nd and 3rd centuries, Tymbrias minted its own coins, some of which bore the image of the river god Eurymedon. Remains can be seen of a shrine dedicated to him, which was situated above the river in front of a cave and which was approached by a bridge and a monumental stairway. A marble statue found near the cave has an inscription on its base referring to the god Eurymedon. Further excavations at the cave uncovered a 2nd-century mother goddess image.

Tymbrias became the seat of a Christian bishop, a suffragan see of Antiochia in Pisidia, the metropolitan see and capital of Pisidia. It is included in the Catholic Church's list of titular sees. `

== See also ==
- List of Catholic titular sees

== Bibliography ==
- Hartwin Brandt, "Timbriada" in Der Neue Pauly Band 12/1, Metzler, Stuttgart 2002, ISBN 3-476-01482-7.
