= Steven Maekawa =

American Roman Catholic bishop

His Excellency, The Most Reverend Steven John Maekawa OP
- Bishop of Fairbanks
- See: Fairbanks
- Appointed: July 11, 2023
- Installed: October 12, 2023
- Predecessor: Chad Zielinski

Orders
- Ordination: May 29, 1998 by John Stephen Cummins
- Consecration: October 12, 2023 by Andrew E. Bellisario, Michael C. Barber and Chad Zielinski

Personal details
- Born: November 22, 1967 (age 58) Seattle, Washington, US
- Education: University of Washington; Dominican School of Philosophy and Theology
- Motto: Duc in altum (Put out into the deep)

Styles of Steven John Maekawa
- Reference style: His Excellency; The Most Reverend
- Spoken style: Your Excellency
- Religious style: Bishop

Steven John Maekawa, O.P. (born 22 November 1967) is an American prelate and Dominican friar of the Catholic Church who has served as bishop for the Diocese of Fairbanks in Alaska since 2023. At the time of his appointment, he was serving as a priest in the Archdiocese of Anchorage–Juneau, where he was the pastor of Holy Family Old Cathedral.

== Biography ==
=== Early life ===
Steven Maekawa was born on November 22, 1967, in Seattle, Washington, to Don and Kiyo Maekawa. He has two sisters and one brother. He is a fourth-generation Japanese American. While attending the University of Washington, he began discerning the priesthood.

After graduating, Maekawa entered the Dominican Order. Having completed the novitiate, he professed his first vows on September 14, 1991. In 1998, Maekawa received a Master of Divinity degree from the Dominican School of Philosophy and Theology in Berkeley, California.

=== Priesthood ===
Maekawa was ordained a priest on May 29, 1998, at St. Augustine Church in Oakland, California for the Dominicans by Bishop John Cummins. After his ordination, the Dominicans assigned Maekawa as an assistant pastor at St. Dominic Parish in San Francisco, California. In 2002, he was named director of the Newman Center at the University of Washington in Seattle, Washington. Maekawa returned to San Francisco in 2005 to become prior of St. Dominic Priory Novitiate in San Francisco. He would serve as prior from 2005 to 2007 and from 2012 to 2016 From 2007 to 2015, he was the director of vocations for the Western Dominican Province.

From 1999 to 2007, Maekawa served as a reserve chaplain in the US Navy Chaplain Corps. He served in Marine reserve units and at Naval Air Station Whidbey Island. He deployed to Afghanistan, assigned to the Army's 25th Infantry Division.

In 2016, Maekawa was assigned pastor of Holy Family Parish in Anchorage, Alaska, which is staffed by the Dominican friars.

=== Bishop of Fairbanks ===
Pope Francis appointed Maekawa as bishop of Fairbanks on July 11, 2023. He was consecrated on October 12, 2023, at the Carlson Center in Fairbanks by Archbishop Andrew Bellisario, with Bishops Chad Zielinski and Michael Barber serving as co-consecrators. His episcopal motto, “Duc in Altum,” is translated as "Put out into the Deep.” It refers to Jesus' command to the Apostle Peter.

Within the US Conference of Catholic Bishops, Maekawa is a member of the Subcommittee on Native American Affairs.

== See also ==
- Catholic Church hierarchy
- Catholic Church in the United States
- Historical list of the Catholic bishops of the United States
- List of Catholic bishops of the United States
- Lists of patriarchs, archbishops, and bishops

== Episcopal succession ==
Catholic Church titles
Preceded by Chad Zielinski	Bishop of Fairbanks; 2023-Present	Succeeded by Incumbent
