= Francis Gleeson (politician) =

American politician (1937–2015)

Francis E. Gleeson, Jr.

Member of the Pennsylvania House of Representatives from the 172nd district
- In office January 7, 1969 – November 30, 1978
- Preceded by: District created
- Succeeded by: John Perzel

Personal details
- Born: November 25, 1937 Philadelphia, Pennsylvania
- Died: February 17, 2015 (aged 77) Philadelphia, Pennsylvania
- Party: Democratic

Francis E. Gleeson Jr. (November 25, 1937 – February 17, 2015) was a Democratic member of the Pennsylvania House of Representatives.
