= Pennsylvania House of Representatives, District 172 =

American legislative district

Pennsylvania's 172nd State House of Representatives district
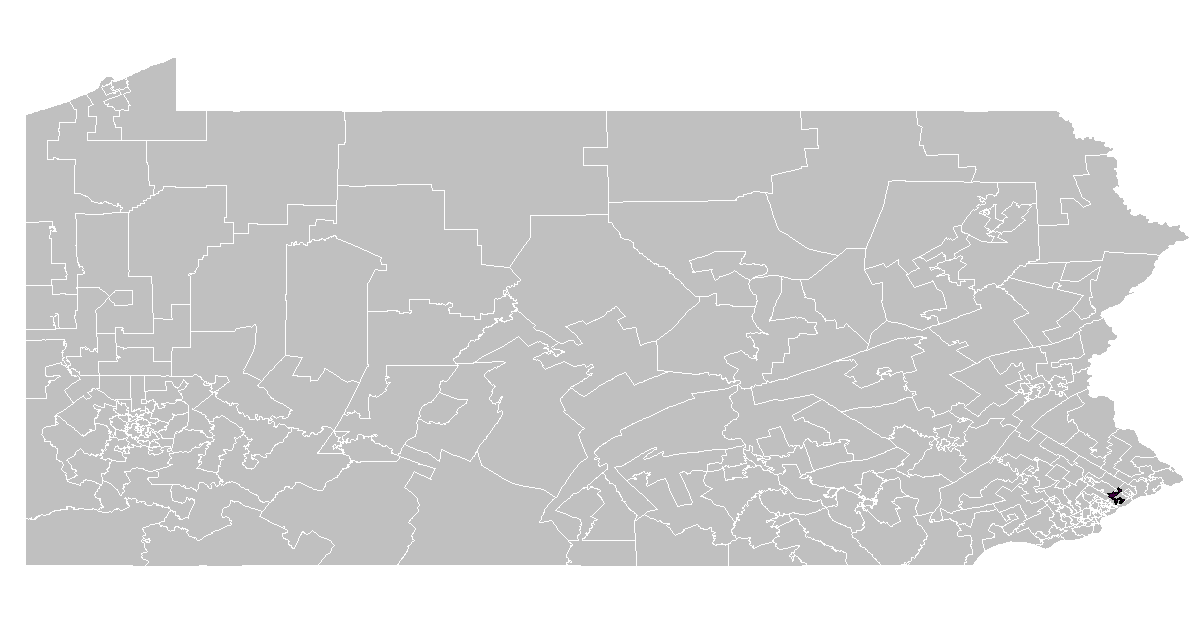
Representative
Sean Dougherty; D–Philadelphia

The 172nd Pennsylvania House of Representatives District is located in Montgomery County and Philadelphia County and includes the following areas:

- Montgomery County
  - Rockledge
- Philadelphia (PART)
  - Ward 41 [PART, Divisions 19, 23 and 24]
  - Ward 54 [PART, Divisions 10, 14, 15, 19, 20, 21 and 22]
  - Ward 55 [PART, Divisions 09, 10, 13, 14, 15, 16 and 17]
  - Ward 56 [PART, Divisions 01, 03, 04, 08, 09, 13, 14, 15, 32, 33, 34 and 40]
  - Ward 57 [PART, Divisions 13 and 14]
  - Ward 58 [PART, Divisions 09, 10, 13, 16, 17, 19 and 26]
  - Ward 63 [PART, Divisions 01, 02, 03, 04, 05, 06, 07, 08, 09, 10, 11, 12, 13, 14, 15, 22, 23 and 25]
  - Ward 64 [PART, Divisions 01, 03, 05, 07, 08, 09 and 15]

== Representatives ==
Representative	Party	Years	District home	Note
Prior to 1969, seats were apportioned by county.
Francis E. Gleeson, Jr.	Democrat	1969 – 1978	Philadelphia	Unsuccessful candidate for re-election
John M. Perzel	Republican	1979 – 2010	Philadelphia	Unsuccessful candidate for re-election
Kevin J. Boyle	Democrat	2011 – 2024	Philadelphia	Unsuccessful candidate for re-election
Sean Dougherty	Democrat	2025 – present	Philadelphia	Incumbent
