= Francis Doyle Gleeson =

American prelate

His Excellency, The Most Reverend Francis Doyle Gleeson SJ
- In office: April 8, 1948 to November 15, 1968
- Successor: Robert Louis Whelan
- Other post: Vicar Apostolic of Alaska

Orders
- Ordination: July 29, 1926 by Jaime Viladrich y Gaspar
- Consecration: April 8, 1948 by Edward Daniel Howard; Robert Dermot O'Flanagan

Personal details
- Born: January 17, 1895 Carrollton, Missouri
- Died: April 30, 1983 (aged 88)
- Education: Gonzaga University; Mount St. Michael Scholasticate; St. Francis Xavier College

Francis Doyle Gleeson SJ (January 17, 1895 – April 30, 1983) was an American prelate of the Roman Catholic Church. He was the first bishop of the Diocese of Fairbanks in Alaska from 1962 to 1968, previously serving as vicar apostolic of the Alaska Vicariate from 1948 to 1962.

== Biography ==
=== Early life ===
Francis Gleeson was born on January 17, 1895, in Carrollton, Missouri, to Charles and Mary (Doyle) Gleason, but later moved with his family to Yakima, Washington. He received his early education at the parochial school of St. Joseph's Church in Yakima. Gleeson then attended Marquette Catholic High School in Yakima before entering Gonzaga University in Spokane, Washington. He entered the Society of Jesus in 1912, and studied philosophy at Mount St. Michael Scholasticate in Spokane. Gleeson then went to study theology at St. Francis Xavier College in Oña, Spain.

=== Priesthood ===
Gleeson was ordained to the priesthood by Bishop Jaime Viladrich y Gaspar for the Society of Jesus in Oña on July 29, 1926. Returning to Washington, he served as rector of Bellarmine Preparatory School in Tacoma, Washington. He was then appointed as superior of St. Stanislaus Mission in Lewiston, Idaho; rector of the Jesuit novitiate in Sheridan, Oregon; and superior of St. Mary's Indian Mission in Omak, Washington.

=== Bishop of Fairbanks ===
On January 8, 1948, Pope Pius XII named Gleeson as titular bishop of Cotenna and vicar apostolic of Alaska. He was consecrated a bishop on April 8, 1948, by Archbishop Edward Howard. The co-consecrators were Bishops Charles White and Martin Johnson.

When the Diocese of Juneau was erected on June 23, 1951, the Diocese of Fairbanks was reduced to Northern Alaska On August 8, 1962, Pope John XXIII named Gleeson as the first bishop of the Diocese of Fairbanks. From 1962 to 1965, he attended all four sessions of the Second Vatican Council in Rome.

=== Resignation and legacy ===
Pope Paul VI accepted Gleeson's resignation as bishop of Fairbanks on November 15, 1968, and named him titular bishop of Cuicul. Francis Gleeson died on April 30, 1983.

In a 2004 lawsuit, Gleeson was accused of shielding a lay worker accused of sexually abusing multiple boys in several Native Alaskan villages. Thirty-three men from villages such as Stebbins, St. Michael and Hooper Bay, accused Joseph Lundowski of multiple attacks. The suit said that Gleeson was aware of Lundowski's crimes, transferring him from one place to another.

Catholic Church titles
Preceded by Walter James Fitzgerald	Vicar Apostolic of Alaska; 1948–1962	Succeeded by None
Preceded by None	Bishop of Fairbanks; 1962–1968	Succeeded by Robert Louis Whelan
