= Northwest Association of Secondary and Higher Schools =

Educational organizations based in the United States

The Northwest Association of Secondary and Higher Schools was an accreditation association formed in 1917, since disbanded.

In 1974, the association changed its name to the Northwest Association of Schools and Colleges.

In 2000, it became the Northwest Association of Schools and Colleges and Universities, which disbanded and split into two separate organizations in 2004, with the Northwest Association of Accredited Schools handling the accreditation of schools and the Northwest Commission on Colleges and Universities handling the accreditation of institutions of higher education.

== See also ==
- Northwest Association of Accredited Schools
- Northwest Commission on Colleges and Universities
