= Jean-Baptiste René =

Jean-Baptiste René SJ (August 22, 1841 – April 6, 1916) was the second Roman Catholic Prefect Apostolic of Alaska.

Born in France, Rene was ordained in 1876. On March 16, 1897, Father Rene was appointed prefect apostolic of Alaska resigning on March 28, 1904. He was later Professor of Scripture and of Hebrew at Spokane.
