= Johnny Dougherty =

American labor leader

"Johnny Doc" Dougherty
- Born: Philadelphia, Pennsylvania
- Education: La Salle University
- Occupations: Electrician; business manager
- Relatives: Kevin Dougherty (brother) Sean Dougherty (nephew)
- Criminal information
- Status: Incarcerated
- Convictions: Fraud (2021); Embezzlement (2023)

John J. "Johnny Doc" Dougherty is a former labor leader in Philadelphia, Pennsylvania. He was the business manager of the powerful IBEW Local 98 and a prominent political figure who helped numerous Democratic candidates get elected by directing donations and volunteers. In 2021, he was convicted of fraud and resigned as business manager of Local 98. In 2023, he was convicted of 70 counts of embezzlement for stealing funds from the union.

In 2015, he was the top campaign fundraiser for the successful campaign of his brother, Kevin Dougherty, to become a justice on the Supreme Court of Pennsylvania Justice.

== Early life and education ==
Dougherty grew up in the Pennsport section of South Philadelphia and graduated from St Joseph Prep in Philadelphia. He briefly attended La Salle University.

== Career ==
Dougherty had planned on becoming a lawyer until he got his girlfriend, Cecelia, pregnant and became an electrician.

In 2003, he was named to the PoliticsPA "Power 50" list of politically influential people in Pennsylvania. In 2003, he was named to the Pennsylvania Report "Power 75" List. In 2010, Politics Magazine named him one of the most influential Democrats in Pennsylvania.

He served as the longtime business manager of Local 98 of the International Brotherhood of Electrical Workers and led the union for over 30 years. During his time leading the union, he raised the payroll deduction to fund the union's political action committee and became a powerful political figure through his ability to direct millions in contributions. Between 2000 and 2014, Local 98 donated over $25 million to political races, and they were also known for using aggressive tactics and intimidation against perceived enemies.

Dougherty had a long-standing feud with former Senator Vince Fumo. During the 2008 Democratic primary for the 1st senatorial district in the Pennsylvania Senate in Philadelphia, Dougherty was dealt a surprising defeat by Larry Farnese, who was heavily supported by Fumo.

In 2015, he endorsed former Philadelphia City Councilman Jim Kenney for Mayor of Philadelphia. His endorsement was a major factor in Kenny winning the crowded Democratic primary. He also helped his brother Kevin Dougherty get elected to the Pennsylvania Supreme Court, allowing Democrats to take a majority on the court.

=== Federal indictments and convictions ===
In January 2019, Dougherty was indicted in an IBEW Local 98 investigation that charged him with misusing union funds for personal benefit and corrupting a public official, along with other related allegations. Dougherty pleaded not guilty. City Councilmember and former electrician Bobby Henon, along with several other employees of the electrical union who were close allies of Dougherty, were also indicted.

In November 2020, the federal judge overseeing the case ruled that the indictment would be split into separate trials. One trial would include all remaining defendants and cover the embezzlement and self-enrichment allegations. The other trial only included Dougherty and Henon on charges of corruption, bribery, and fraud. Three of the other defendants who were union employees pleaded guilty in December 2022, prior to Dougherty's embezzlement case going to trial.

In March 2021, Dougherty and his nephew, Gregory Fiocca, were arrested and charged in another federal indictment with 19 counts of conspiracy and extortion. The U.S. Attorney's Office alleged Dougherty and Fiocca threatened a contractor "through force and violence, and threats of violence and economic harm".

On November 15, 2021, Dougherty was convicted on charges of one count of conspiracy to commit fraud and seven counts of wire fraud. Shortly after the conviction, Dougherty announced his resignation as business manager of IBEW Local 98. He faces a maximum 20-year sentence.

In December 2023, Dougherty was convicted of 70 counts of embezzlement for stealing from IBEW Local 98 while he was business manager. Dougherty was convicted along with former union president Brian Burrows and four other union employees for stealing hundreds of thousands from union accounts to pay for personal expenses. During the trial, one co-defendant testified that Dougherty's brother, Pennsylvania Supreme Court Justice Kevin Dougherty received free home repairs paid for by the union.

In April 2024, the trial against Dougherty for extortion was declared a mistrial by the judge. His sentencing for both his 2021 and 2023 convictions was postponed in May 2024.

In September 2026, President Trump commuted Dougherty's sentence from 2024. Dougherty is set to be released from prison early.

=== Department of Labor civil suit ===
In January 2021, following another FBI raid of IBEW Local 98 headquarters, the US Department of Labor filed a civil suit to nullify Dougherty’s most recent election as the union's business manager. The suit alleges Dougherty and associates intimidated potential challengers to Dougherty and warned of reprisals should any contest the election, which took place after Dougherty’s 2019 federal indictment.
