= Immaculate Conception Church (Fairbanks, Alaska) =

Historic church in Alaska, United States

- U.S. National Register of Historic Places
- Alaska Heritage Resources Survey
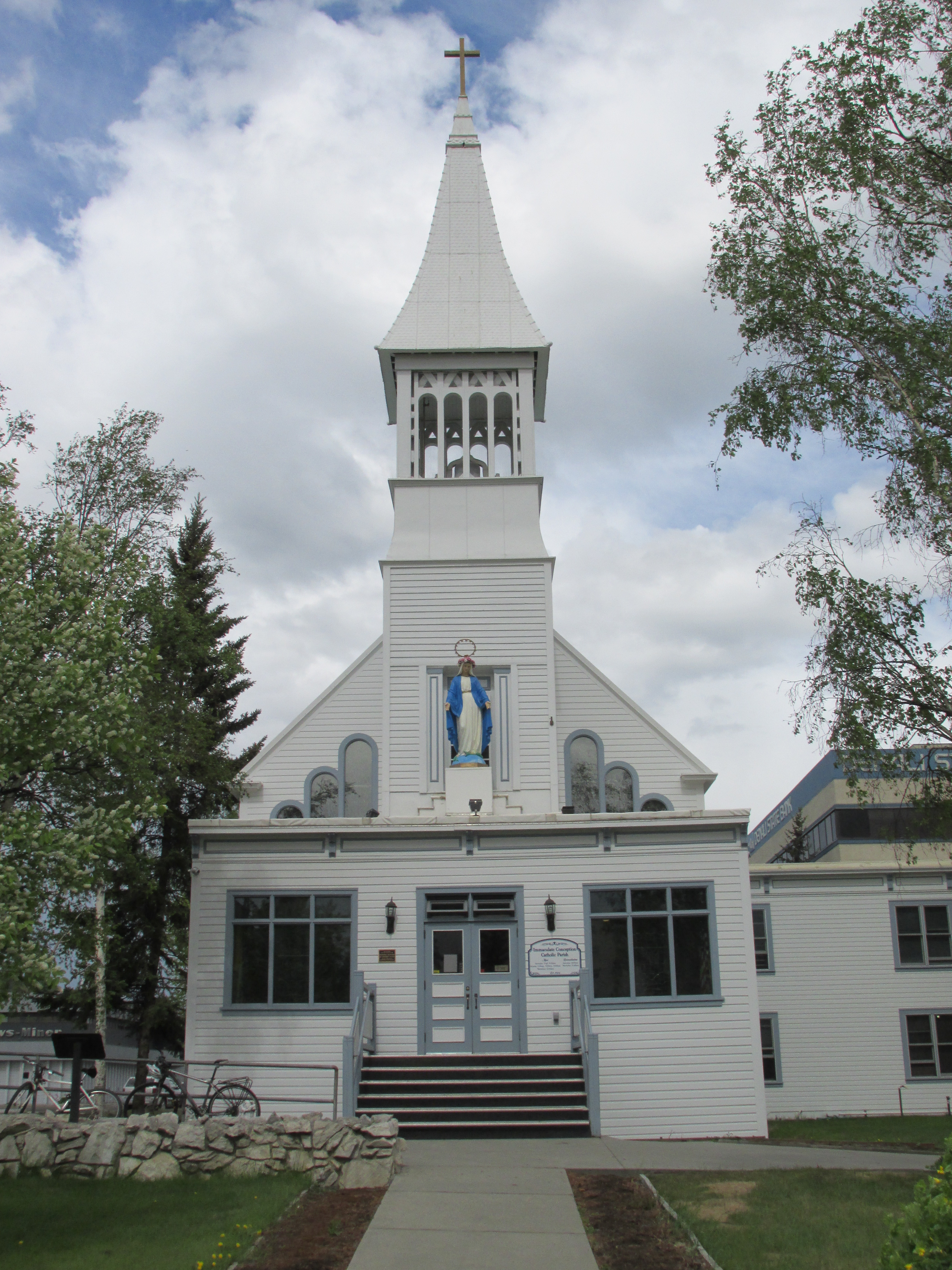

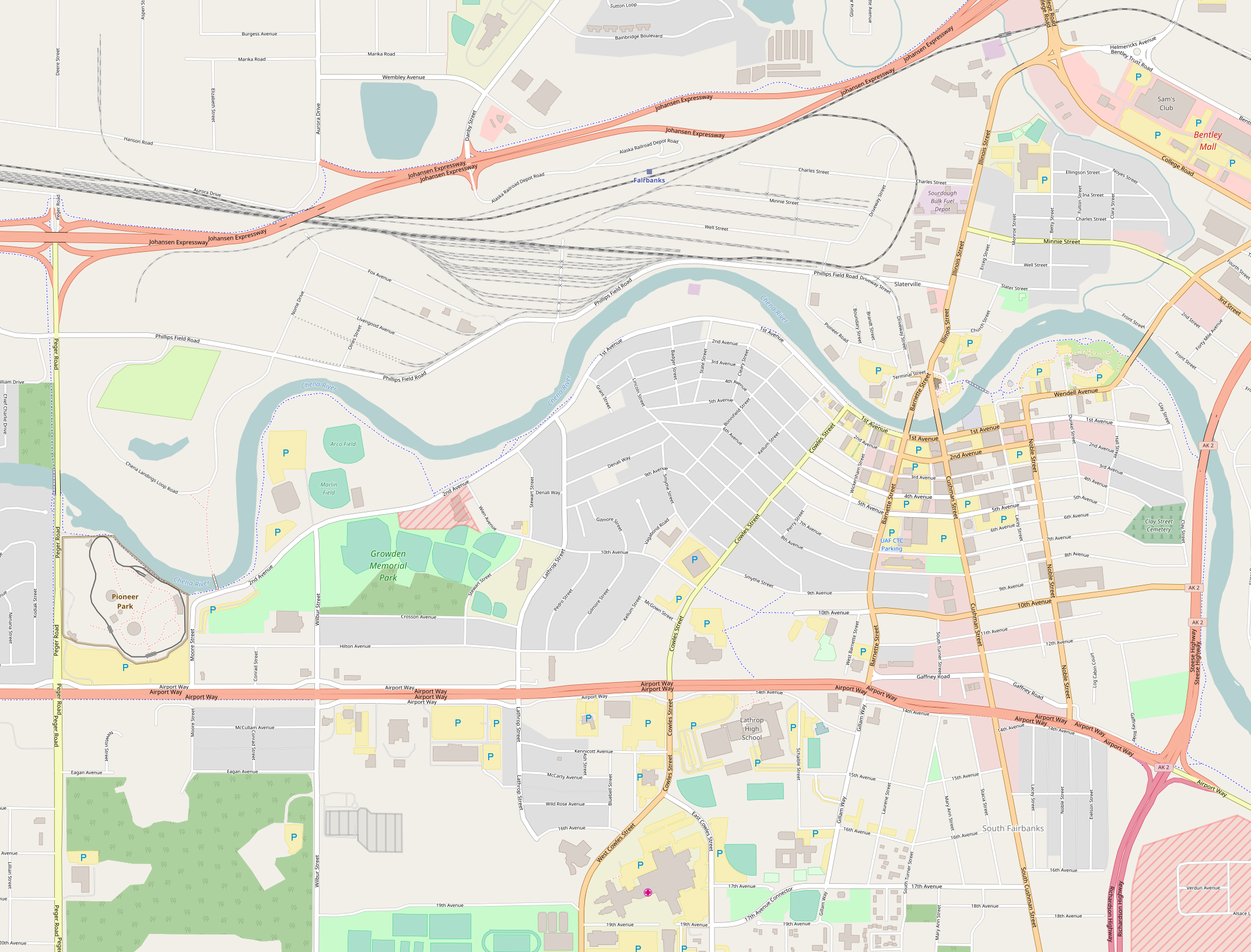
- Location within Downtown Fairbanks Location within Alaska
- Location: 115 North Cushman Street, Fairbanks, Alaska
- Coordinates: 64°50′43″N 147°43′18″W
- Area: less than one acre
- Built: 1904
- NRHP reference No.: 76002278
- AHRS No.: FAI-030

Significant dates
- Added to NRHP: April 3, 1976
- Designated AHRS: October 10, 1972

The Immaculate Conception Church is a historic church and former cathedral at 115 N. Cushman Street in Fairbanks, Alaska, United States.

Built in 1904, it was the first Roman Catholic Church erected in Alaska's interior. The church was originally located on Dunkel Street, but in the winter of 1911–12, the church was moved across the Chena River to its present location so that it would be closer to St. Joseph's Hospital, which closed in the 1970s. After the move, the basement of rough frame structure was enlarged to provide a parish hall, it was wired for electricity, and a parish house was built adjacent. The steeple and vestibule were added in 1914, the roof was raised, and the choir gallery added. Its stained glass windows were added in 1926–28.

The church was listed on the National Register of Historic Places in 1976.

== See also ==
- List of Catholic cathedrals in the United States
- List of cathedrals in the United States
- National Register of Historic Places listings in Fairbanks North Star Borough, Alaska
