= Bellarmine Preparatory School =

Location
- 2300 South Washington Street; Tacoma, Pierce County, Washington 98405-1304; United States; 47°14′16″N 122°29′7″W

Information
- Type: Private, Catholic, Coeducational college preparatory high school
- Motto: Ad Majorem Del Gloriam; For the Greater Glory of God
- Religious affiliation: Roman Catholic (Jesuit)
- Patron saint: St. Robert Bellarmine
- Established: 1928; 98 years ago
- Founder: Fr. David McAstocker, S.J.
- CEEB code: 481365
- President: Dr. Kelly Goodsell
- Principal: Cindy Davis
- Chaplain: Fr. Greg Celio
- Staff: 45
- Faculty: 76
- Grades: 9–12
- Enrollment: 900 (September 1, 2025)
  - Grade 9: 225
  - Grade 10: 230
  - Grade 11: 216
  - Grade 12: 230
- Average class size: 22
- Student to teacher ratio: 14:1
- Campus size: 42 acres (170,000 m^{2})
- Campus type: Urban
- Houses: Thérèse of Lisieux; Francis Xavier; Ignatius of Loyola; Lady of Guadalupe; Maximillian Kolbe; Kateri Tekakwitha
- Colors: Blue and White
- Fight song: "Fight Lions"
- Athletics: 44 athletic teams
- Athletics conference: 3A PSL
- Sports: 19 sports
- Mascot: Lion
- Nickname: BPS, Bellarmine Prep
- Team name: Lions
- Accreditation: AdvancED
- Newspaper: The Bellarmine Lion
- Yearbook: The Cage
- Endowment: $24,000,000
- Tuition: $22.265 (2026-27)
- Communities served: Students from the Greater Tacoma area, Olympia, Gig Harbor, Federal Way and Puyallup.
- Feeder schools: Saint Patrick Catholic School, Saint Charles Borromeo Catholic School, Holy Family Catholic School, Pope Saint John Paul XXIII STEM Academy, Saint Frances Cabrini
- Website: www.bellarmineprep.org

Bellarmine Preparatory School is a private Catholic co-educational high school run by the USA West Province of the Society of Jesus in Tacoma, Washington. It is located in the Archdiocese of Seattle. Today, it serves just over 900 students from the Greater Tacoma area, including Olympia, Gig Harbor, Federal Way, and Puyallup. It was founded in 1928 by the Jesuits.

== History ==
Bellarmine was founded in 1928 as an all-boys school and became the second co-educational Jesuit school in the nation in 1974 after its merger with the schools Aquinas and St. Leo's. Three girls, however, did graduate in the 1973-74 graduating year. The date of the school's creation is commonly accepted to be 1928. However, Saint Leo's Grammar and High School and Aquinas Academy for girls were founded earlier (1912 and 1893, respectively). Philomathea, the parents club, predates Bellarmine as it was founded at St. Leo's before moving to the school during the merger. The first graduating class of Bellarmine was in 1929, with 19 students graduating.

== Campus ==
The school sits on a large campus of 42 acres, at the highest point overlooking the city of Tacoma. Poplar trees were planted as a memorial to Bellarmine Alumni in World War II near Memorial Field. Memorial Field remained a grass field up until 2017, when it was replaced by a new turf field over the summer before the 2017-2018 school year. The school quad has the qualities of a Grad at Grad printed in metal letters on the concrete and the letters AMDG printed at the quad's center-most point.

== Student life ==
=== Co-curricular activities ===
==== FIRST Robotics ====
The school competes in the FIRST Robotics Competition (FRC) as Team 360, The Revolution. Established in 1999, the team has been recognized for the quality of the robots produced and for their commitment to community service. They are the oldest sustaining team in the Pacific Northwest District at 25 years. They have won multiple awards:

- 2024 PNW Glacier Peak District Competition Winner
- 2022 PNW Auburn District Competition Winner
- 2016 FIRST Championship Woodie Flowers (Eric Stokely)
- 2016 PNW District Championships Winner
- 2015 Auburn District Competition Winner
- 2012 Autodesk Oregon Regional Winner
- 2011 Autodesk Oregon Regional Winner
- 2011 Microsoft Seattle Cascade Regional Chairman's Award
- 2009 Microsoft Seattle Regional Chairman's Award

==== Model UN ====
In 2013, Bellarmine's Model UN program BellarMUN was created. It attends several conferences every year, including PACMUN, CAIMUN, AmeriMUNC and VMUN. BellarMUN also hosts its own middle school conference, BELLARMUN.

=== Athletics ===
Over 70% of the student population competes in at least one athletic activity.

Boys' sports offered: Cross country, Basketball, Wrestling, Tennis, Golf, Track and Field, Baseball, Soccer, Lacrosse, Sailing, and Football.

Girls' sports offered: Volleyball, Cross country, Basketball, Fast pitch, Track and field, Lacrosse, Sailing, Soccer, Tennis, and Golf.

=== Theater ===
Bellarmine has a theater program which puts on two shows per year: a fall play and a spring musical, as well as a Dramafest featuring student-written one-act plays.

== Community service ==
As part of the required curriculum, Juniors must complete a total of thirty hours of community service, as well as helping out at the local L'Arche farm with their Ignatian Formation (homeroom) class during their Freshman year. Several community service clubs are active on campus such as Habitat for Humanity and Key Club, and Bellarmine offers several programs that serve the community, including Nativity House and Operation Keep ‘Em Warm and Fed.

In 1993, Bellarmine started Phoenix Housing, a tradition of housing temporarily homeless families in academic buildings during non-school hours for a small span of the year. Bellarmine provides these people dinner, breakfast, and overnight accommodations through the help of student volunteers.

== Religion ==
Religion is an integral part of the Bellarmine curriculum, with 3.5 credits of religion classes required for graduation.

=== Retreats ===
Bellarmine holds a required student body retreat for the freshmen, called "On a Purpose for a Purpose". Freshmen and sophomores are also required to attend Faith in Formation meetings. These generally occur during CP (Community Period), now named Ignatian Formation (homeroom). The freshman meetings focus more on volunteer work, including participation in a Habitat for Humanity build or work with L'Arche.

An optional overnight retreat, the Francis Xavier Urban Plunge, is offered in the fall and spring for sophomores. The retreat focuses on "street life" in the Tacoma Area.

Four retreats are offered to seniors. Senior Pilgrimage is a weekend hike up a mountain. Montserrat is an Ignatian-directed retreat which is made in complete silence for a 24-hour period, and the Manresa is also a silent retreat over a 48-hour period. The Magis is a three-day overnight retreat.

Bellarmine students may also work on crew or team for the Senior Pilgrimage, Magis retreat, and Junior Encounter.

=== Mass ===
All school Masses are rare, normally on Ash Wednesday, the last day before Christmas break, and the Feast of Saint Robert Bellarmine. The entire school attends, but active participation is optional. There are also occasional House Masses and prayer services, and Mass is offered on Thursdays prior to the start of school.

== Academics ==
Bellarmine offers 41 Advanced Placement, Honors or Dual Credit courses.

At BPS, a total of 21 credits are specified as department requirements. A total of 26 credits will be required for graduation and a College Preparatory Diploma. The four-year semester program provides opportunities for students to earn 28.5 credits.

=== Art ===
Bellarmine is home to an art program which offers activities such as Design, Crafts, Ceramics, Photography, Sculpture, Drawing, Painting, Printmaking and Theater. A senior is required to fulfill 1 Fine Arts credit by graduation— .5 credit in Visual Arts is required in addition to .5 credit in Visual Arts, Music or Stagecraft.

=== Marine Chemistry ===
The marine chemistry program is available to students who score sufficiently well on the school entrance examination and opt into doing extra research work to fulfill this requirement. It is a four-year program where students learn the skills needed to do chemical and biological marine research in their first two years, and then apply those skills in their own research projects during their junior and senior years.

== Notable alumni ==
- Avery Bradley, NBA free agent guard, most recently for the Los Angeles Lakers, Class of 2009
- Casey Calvary, former professional basketball player, Class of 1997
- Malachi Flynn, NBA guard for the Detroit Pistons, Class of 2016
- Abdul Gaddy, basketball player in the Israeli Basketball Premier League, Class of 2009
- Patrick Galbraith, former professional tennis player, Class of 1985
- Jon Lester, former Major League Baseball pitcher, Class of 2002
- Larry Loughlin, MLB pitcher (Philadelphia Phillies), Class of 1959
- Ron Medved, NFL defensive back (Philadelphia Eagles), Class of 1962
- Louis Renner, S.J., Jesuit, academic and historian of Catholic history in Alaska
- Kyle Stanley, professional golfer, Class of 2006
- Michael Rector, Detroit Lions (& Stanford University) wide receiver, Class of 2012
- Sefo Liufau, University of Colorado quarterback, Class of 2013
