= 2022 Pennsylvania House of Representatives election =

- November 8, 2022

All 203 seats in the Pennsylvania House of Representatives 102 seats needed for a majority
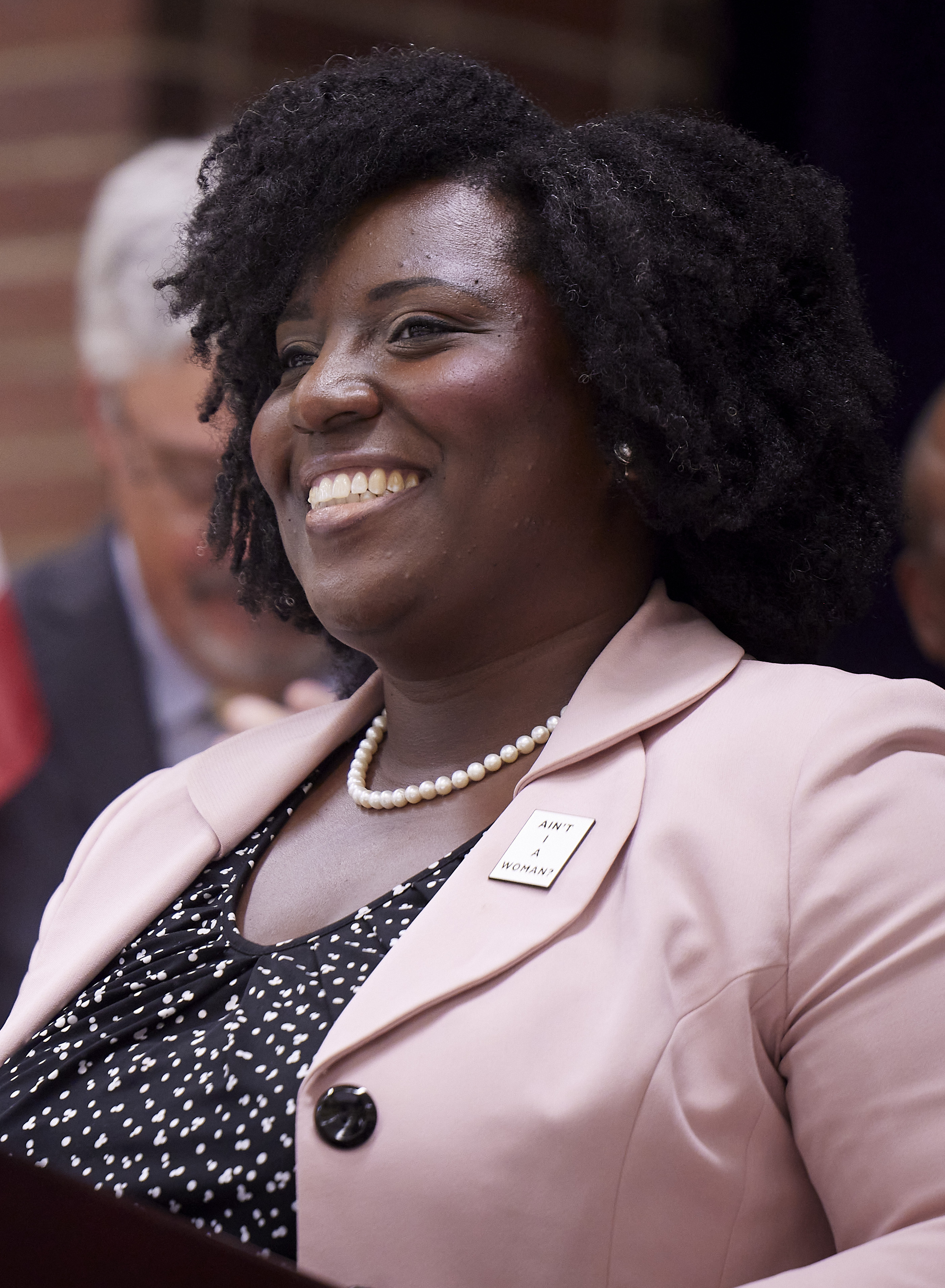

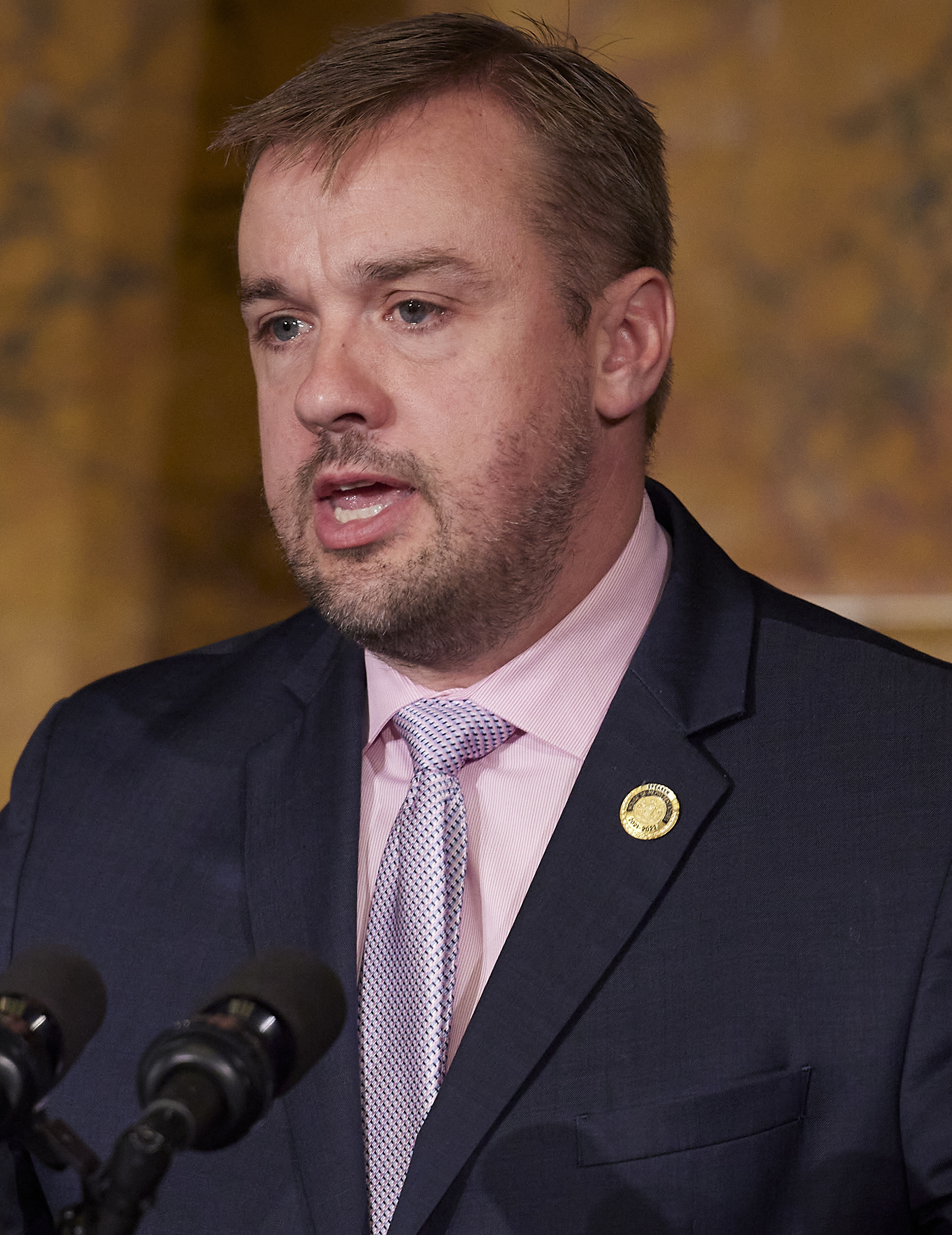
| | Majority party | Minority party |
|---|---|---|
| Leader | Joanna McClinton | Bryan Cutler |
| Party | Democratic | Republican |
| Leader since | December 1, 2020 | June 22, 2020 |
| Leader's seat | 191st | 100th |
| Last election | 90 | 113 |
| Seats after | 102 | 101 |
| Seat change | ▲12 | ▼12 |
| Popular vote | 2,258,892 | 2,638,894 |
| Percentage | 45.76% | 53.46% |
| Swing | ▼0.81% | ▲0.73% |
- Democratic gain Republican gain Democratic hold Republican hold 50–60% 60–70% 70–80% 80–90% >90% 50–60% 60–70% 70–80% 80–90% >90%
Speaker before election
Bryan Cutler
Republican
Elected Speaker
Mark Rozzi
Democratic

The 2022 elections for the Pennsylvania House of Representatives were held on November 8, 2022, with all districts currently being decided. The term of office for those elected in 2022 began when the House of Representatives convened in January 2023. Pennsylvania State Representatives are elected for two-year terms, with all 203 seats up for election every two years.

In what was described as a "shocking upset", Democrats gained 12 seats, giving them a majority of 102 out of 203 seats and winning control of the chamber for the first time since 2010, despite losing the popular vote (although this was partly because there were many uncontested Republican districts). This defied many analysts’ predictions, including that of Sabato's Crystal Ball, which had rated House control as "Likely Republican".

== Special elections ==
=== 19th legislative district ===
This election took place on April 5, 2022.

District 19 special election
| Party | Candidate | Votes | % |
|---|---|---|---|
| Democratic | Aerion Abney | 2,707 | 85.02 |
| Write-in | | 477 | 14.98 |
| Total votes | | 3,184 | 100% |
| Democratic hold | | | |

Democrat Aerion Abney was elected to finish the term of Jake Wheatley, who resigned to become the chief of staff to Pittsburgh Mayor Ed Gainey.

=== 24th legislative district ===
This election took place on April 5, 2022.

District 24 special election
| Party | Candidate | Votes | % |
|---|---|---|---|
| Democratic | Martell Covington | 5,101 | 92.95 |
| Republican | Todd Elliott Koger | 313 | 5.70 |
| Write-in | | 74 | 1.35 |
| Total votes | | 5,488 | 100% |
| Democratic hold | | | |

Democrat Martell Covington was elected to finish the term of Ed Gainey, who resigned to become the mayor of Pittsburgh.

=== 116th legislative district ===
This election took place on April 5, 2022.

District 116 special election
| Party | Candidate | Votes | % |
|---|---|---|---|
| Republican | Robert Schnee | 2,818 | 55.93 |
| Democratic | Amilcar S. Arroyo | 1,291 | 25.63 |
| Libertarian | Paul Cwalina | 213 | 4.23 |
| Write-in | | 716 | 14.21 |
| Total votes | | 5,038 | 100% |
| Republican hold | | | |

Republican Robert Schnee was elected to finish the term of Tarah Toohil, who resigned to become a judge on the Luzerne County Court of Common Pleas.

== Results summary ==
=== Redistricting ===
Due to redistricting after the 2020 United States census, several representatives were drawn into new districts, and some districts had no incumbent.

=== Retiring incumbents ===
==== Democrats ====
1. District 7: Mark Longietti retired.
2. District 50: Pam Snyder retired.
3. District 113: Thom Welby retired.
4. District 118: Mike Carroll retired.
5. District 119: Gerald Mullery retired.
6. District 156: Dianne Herrin retired.
7. District 173: Michael Driscoll retired to run for Philadelphia City Council.
8. District 180: Angel Cruz retired.
9. District 182: Brian Sims retired to run for lieutenant governor of Pennsylvania.

==== Republicans ====
1. District 4: Curt Sonney retired.
2. District 33: Carrie DelRosso retired to run for lieutenant governor of Pennsylvania.
3. District 12: Daryl Metcalfe retired.
4. District 29: Meghan Schroeder retired.
5. District 30: Lori Mizgorski retired to run for state senator from District 38.
6. District 51: Matt Dowling retired (after winning his primary) after Pennsylvania State Police charged him with DUI.
7. District 54: Robert Brooks retired.
8. District 73: Tommy Sankey retired.
9. District 83: Jeff Wheeland retired.
10. District 87: Greg Rothman retired to run for state senator from District 34.
11. District 98: David Hickernell retired.
12. District 101: Frank Ryan retired.
13. District 104: Sue Helm retired.
14. District 105: Andrew Lewis retired.
15. District 107: Kurt Masser retired.
16. District 109: David Millard retired.
17. District 116: Robert Schnee retired.
18. District 117: Karen Boback retired.
19. District 124: Jerry Knowles retired.
20. District 129: Jim Cox retired.
21. District 139: Michael Peifer retired.
22. District 142: Frank Farry retired to run for state senator from District 6.
23. District 147: Tracy Pennycuick retired to run for state senator from District 24.
24. District 178: Wendi Thomas retired.
25. District 189: Rosemary Brown retired to run for state senator from District 40.

=== Incumbents defeated in primary ===
==== Democrats ====
1. District 24: Martell Covington lost renomination to La'Tasha Mayes.
2. District 159: Brian Kirkland lost renomination to Carol Kazeem.
3. District 194: Pam DeLissio lost renomination to Tarik Khan.
4. District 200: Isabella Fitzgerald lost renomination to fellow incumbent Chris Rabb in a redistricting race.

==== Republicans ====
1. District 39: Mike Puskaric lost renomination to Andrew Kuzma.
2. District 47: Keith Gillespie lost renomination to Joe D'Orsie.
3. District 55: Jason Silvis lost renomination to Jill Cooper.
4. District 86: John Hershey lost renomination to fellow incumbent Perry Stambaugh in a redistricting race.
5. District 94: Stan Saylor lost renomination to Wendy Fink.
6. District 187: Gary Day lost renomination to fellow incumbent Ryan Mackenzie in a redistricting race.

== Primary elections ==
=== Democratic primary ===
2022 Pennsylvania House of Representatives elections Democratic primary
| District | Candidates | Votes | Percent |
|---|---|---|---|
| 1 | Pat Harkins | Unopposed | |
| 2 | Robert Merski | Unopposed | |
| 3 | Ryan Bizzarro | Unopposed | |
| 4 | Chelsea Oliver | Unopposed | |
| 5 | No candidate filed for party. | | |
| 6 | Nerissa Galt | Unopposed | |
| 7 | Timothy M. McGonigle | 5,024 | 80.77 |
| 7 | Mitchel Henderson | 1,177 | 18.92 |
| 8 | No candidate filed for party. | | |
| 9 | Chris Sainato | Unopposed | |
| 10 | Amen Brown | 3,064 | 39.85 |
| 10 | Cassandra Green | 2,881 | 37.47 |
| 10 | Sajda Blackwell | 1,714 | 22.29 |
| 11 | No candidate filed for party. | | |
| 12 | Robert Vigue | Unopposed | |
| 13 | Chamir James | Unopposed | |
| 14 | Bruce Carper Jr. | Unopposed | |
| 15 | No candidate filed for party. | | |
| 16 | Robert Matzie | Unopposed | |
| 17 | No candidate filed for party. | | |
| 18 | Krzysztof Walski | Unopposed | |
| 19 | Aerion Abney | 5,080 | 64.06 |
| 19 | Glenn Grayson | 2,809 | 35.42 |
| 20 | Emily Kinkead | 6,352 | 65.4 |
| 20 | Nicholas Mastros | 3,317 | 34.15 |
| 21 | Sara Innamorato | Unopposed | |
| 22 | Joshua Siegel | 1,712 | 63.69 |
| 22 | Saeed Georges | 963 | 35.83 |
| 23 | Dan Frankel | Unopposed | |
| 24 | LaTasha D. Mayes | 5,358 | 45.96 |
| 24 | Martell Covington | 4,411 | 37.84 |
| 24 | Randall Taylor | 1,824 | 15.65 |
| 25 | Brandon Markosek | Unopposed | |
| 26 | Paul Friel | Unopposed | |
| 27 | Dan Deasy | Unopposed | |
| 28 | No candidate filed for party. | | |
| 29 | Timothy Brennan | Unopposed | |
| 30 | Arvind Venkat | Unopposed | |
| 31 | Perry Warren Jr. | Unopposed | |
| 32 | Anthony M. Deluca | Unopposed | |
| 33 | Mandy Steele | 5,358 | 63.81 |
| 33 | Tristen McClelland | 2,982 | 35.51 |
| 34 | Summer Lee | 9,168 | 65.59 |
| 34 | Abigail Salisbury | 4,767 | 34.11 |
| 35 | Austin Davis | Unopposed | |
| 36 | Jessica Benham | 6,015 | 67.97 |
| 36 | Stephanie Fox | 2,805 | 31.7 |
| 37 | No candidate filed for party. | | |
| 38 | Nick Pisciottano | Unopposed | |
| 39 | No candidate filed for party. | | |
| 40 | No candidate filed for party. | | |
| 41 | No candidate filed for party. | | |
| 42 | Dan Miller | Unopposed | |
| 43 | No candidate filed for party. | | |
| 44 | No candidate filed for party. | | |
| 45 | Anita Kulik | Unopposed | |
| 46 | No candidate filed for party. | | |
| 47 | No candidate filed for party. | | |
| 48 | No candidate filed for party. | | |
| 49 | Ismail Smith-Wade-El | 3,148 | 69.13 |
| 49 | Janet Diaz | 1,412 | 30.87 |
| 50 | Douglas Mason | Unopposed | |
| 51 | Richard Ringer | Unopposed | |
| 52 | No candidate filed for party. | | |
| 53 | Steve Malagari | Unopposed | |
| 54 | Greg Scott | 3,070 | 53.71 |
| 54 | Rochelle Culbreath | 2,628 | 45.98 |
| 55 | Scott Gauss (Note: Won as a write-in candidate) | 602 | 64.87 |
| 56 | No candidate filed for party. | | |
| 57 | No candidate filed for party. | | |
| 58 | Kenneth Bach | Unopposed | |
| 59 | No candidate filed for party. | | |
| 60 | Robert George | Unopposed | |
| 61 | Liz Hanbidge | Unopposed | |
| 62 | Brian Doyle | Unopposed | |
| 63 | No candidate filed for party. | | |
| 64 | No candidate filed for party. | | |
| 65 | No candidate filed for party. | | |
| 66 | No candidate filed for party. | | |
| 67 | No candidate filed for party. | | |
| 68 | No candidate filed for party. | | |
| 69 | No candidate filed for party. | | |
| 70 | Matthew Bradford | Unopposed | |
| 71 | No candidate filed for party. | | |
| 72 | Frank Burns | 4,765 | 71.17 |
| 72 | Michael Cashaw | 1,896 | 28.32 |
| 73 | No candidate filed for party. | | |
| 74 | Dan K. Williams | Unopposed | |
| 75 | No candidate filed for party. | | |
| 76 | Denise Maris | 2,381 | 61.52 |
| 76 | Elijah Probst | 1,450 | 37.47 |
| 77 | Scott Conklin | Unopposed | |
| 78 | No candidate filed for party. | | |
| 79 | No candidate filed for party. | | |
| 80 | Kimberly Capenos | Unopposed | |
| 81 | Ian Kidd | Unopposed | |
| 82 | Paul Takac | Unopposed | |
| 83 | No candidate filed for party. | | |
| 84 | No candidate filed for party. | | |
| 85 | No candidate filed for party. | | |
| 86 | No candidate filed for party. | | |
| 87 | Kristal Markle | Unopposed | |
| 88 | Sara Agerton | Unopposed | |
| 89 | No candidate filed for party. | | |
| 90 | No candidate filed for party. | | |
| 91 | No candidate filed for party. | | |
| 92 | Daniel Almoney | Unopposed | |
| 93 | Christopher Rodkey | Unopposed | |
| 94 | No candidate filed for party. | | |
| 95 | Carol Hill-Evans | Unopposed | |
| 96 | Mike Sturla | 4,209 | 57.08 |
| 96 | Dana Hamp Gulick | 3,155 | 42.79 |
| 97 | No candidate filed for party. | | |
| 98 | Mark Temons II | Unopposed | |
| 99 | Joshua Michael Caltagirone | Unopposed | |
| 100 | No candidate filed for party. | | |
| 101 | Catherine Miller | Unopposed | |
| 102 | Susan Quick | Unopposed | |
| 103 | Patty Kim | 5,602 | 75 |
| 103 | Heather MacDonald | 1,853 | 24.81 |
| 104 | Dave Madsen | Unopposed | |
| 105 | Justin C. Fleming | 4,599 | 60.88 |
| 105 | Eric Epstein | 2,946 | 39 |
| 106 | No candidate filed for party. | | |
| 107 | No candidate filed for party. | | |
| 108 | No candidate filed for party. | | |
| 109 | Edward Giannattasio | Unopposed | |
| 110 | No candidate filed for party. | | |
| 111 | No candidate filed for party. | | |
| 112 | Kyle Mullins | Unopposed | |
| 113 | Kyle Donahue | 4,400 | 64.6 |
| 113 | Patrick Flynn | 2,374 | 34.86 |
| 114 | Bridget Kosierowski | Unopposed | |
| 115 | Maureen Madden | Unopposed | |
| 116 | Yesenia Rodriguez | Unopposed | |
| 117 | No candidate filed for party. | | |
| 118 | Jim Haddock | 4,798 | 54.75 |
| 118 | Allison Lucarelli | 3,913 | 44.65 |
| 119 | Vito Malacari | Unopposed | |
| 120 | Fern Leard | 590 | 46.06 |
| 121 | Eddie Day Pashinski | Unopposed | |
| 122 | Richard Kost | Unopposed | |
| 123 | Kathleen Benyak | Unopposed | |
| 124 | Tina Burns | Unopposed | |
| 125 | No candidate filed for party. | | |
| 126 | Mark Rozzi | Unopposed | |
| 127 | Manny Guzman Jr. | Unopposed | |
| 128 | No candidate filed for party. | | |
| 129 | Johanny Cepeda-Freytiz | 2,383 | 54.68 |
| 129 | Mark Detterline | 1,969 | 45.18 |
| 130 | No candidate filed for party. | | |
| 131 | Kevin Branco | Unopposed | |
| 132 | Michael Schlossberg | Unopposed | |
| 133 | Jeanne McNeill | Unopposed | |
| 134 | Peter Schweyer | 2,843 | 63 |
| 134 | Enid Santiago | 1,666 | 36.92 |
| 135 | Steve Samuelson | Unopposed | |
| 136 | Robert L. Freeman | Unopposed | |
| 137 | Anna Thomas | Unopposed | |
| 138 | No candidate filed for party. | | |
| 139 | Meghan Rosenfeld | 2,202 | 53.14 |
| 139 | Marian Keegan | 1,913 | 46.16 |
| 140 | John Galloway | Unopposed | |
| 141 | Tina Davis | Unopposed | |
| 142 | Mark Moffa | Unopposed | |
| 143 | Gwen Stoltz | Unopposed | |
| 144 | Brian Munroe | Unopposed | |
| 145 | No candidate filed for party. | | |
| 146 | Joe Ciresi | Unopposed | |
| 147 | Alexandra Wisser | Unopposed | |
| 148 | Mary Jo Daley | Unopposed | |
| 149 | Tim Briggs | Unopposed | |
| 150 | Joe Webster | Unopposed | |
| 151 | Melissa Cerrato | Unopposed | |
| 152 | Nancy Guenst | Unopposed | |
| 153 | Ben Sanchez | Unopposed | |
| 154 | Napoleon Nelson | Unopposed | |
| 155 | Danielle Friel Otten | Unopposed | |
| 156 | Chris Pielli | Unopposed | |
| 157 | Melissa Shusterman | Unopposed | |
| 158 | Christina Sappey | Unopposed | |
| 159 | Carol Kazeem | 2,545 | 55.76 |
| 159 | Brian Kirkland | 2,019 | 44.24 |
| 160 | Cathy Spahr | Unopposed | |
| 161 | Leanne Krueger | Unopposed | |
| 162 | David Delloso | Unopposed | |
| 163 | Michael Zabel | Unopposed | |
| 164 | Gina Curry | Unopposed | |
| 165 | Jennifer O'Mara | Unopposed | |
| 166 | Greg Vitali | 5,979 | 58.18 |
| 166 | David Brown | 4,298 | 41.82 |
| 167 | Kristine Howard | Unopposed | |
| 168 | Lisa Borowski | Unopposed | |
| 169 | Isaac Riston | Unopposed | |
| 170 | No candidate filed for party. | | |
| 171 | Robert Zeigler | Unopposed | |
| 172 | Kevin J. Boyle | 3,656 | 68.01 |
| 172 | Bob Stewart | 1,707 | 31.75 |
| 173 | Pat Gallagher | 2,912 | 63.86 |
| 173 | Pete McDermott | 1,636 | 35.88 |
| 174 | Ed Neilson | Unopposed | |
| 175 | Mary Isaacson | Unopposed | |
| 176 | Hope Christman | Unopposed | |
| 177 | Joseph C. Hohenstein | Unopposed | |
| 178 | Ilya Breyman | Unopposed | |
| 179 | Jason Dawkins | Unopposed | |
| 180 | Jose Giral | Unopposed | |
| 181 | Malcolm Kenyatta | Unopposed | |
| 182 | Ben Waxman | 5,497 | 40.17 |
| 182 | Jonathan Lovitz | 2,825 | 20.64 |
| 182 | Deja Alvarez | 2,680 | 19.58 |
| 182 | William Gross | 2,670 | 19.51 |
| 183 | No candidate filed for party. | | |
| 184 | Elizabeth Fiedler | 7,876 | 79.06 |
| 184 | Michael A. Giangiordano II | 2,075 | 20.83 |
| 185 | Regina Young | Unopposed | |
| 186 | Jordan A. Harris | Unopposed | |
| 187 | No candidate filed for party. | | |
| 188 | Rick Krajewski | 6,596 | 71.01 |
| 188 | James Wright | 2,672 | 28.77 |
| 189 | Tarah Probst | Unopposed | |
| 190 | G. Roni Green | Unopposed | |
| 191 | Joanna McClinton | Unopposed | |
| 192 | Morgan Cephas | Unopposed | |
| 193 | No candidate filed for party. | | |
| 194 | Tarik Khan | 7,475 | 59.47 |
| 194 | Pam DeLissio | 5,076 | 40.39 |
| 195 | Donna Bullock | Unopposed | |
| 196 | No candidate filed for party. | | |
| 197 | Danilo Burgos | Unopposed | |
| 198 | Darisha Parker | Unopposed | |
| 199 | Robert Howe | Unopposed | |
| 200 | Chris Rabb | 11,554 | 62.67 |
| 200 | Isabella Fitzgerald | 6,854 | 37.18 |
| 201 | Stephen Kinsey | '5,903 | 57.38 |
| 201 | Andre D. Carroll | 4,357 | 42.35 |
| 202 | Jared Solomon | Unopposed | |
| 203 | Anthony A. Bellmon | 2,446 | 47.26 |
| 203 | Heather Miller | 1,475 | 28.5 |
| 203 | Yusuf Jackson | 1,246 | 24.07 |

=== Republican primary ===
2022 Pennsylvania House of Representatives elections Republican primary
| District | Candidates | Votes | Percent |
|---|---|---|---|
| 1 | No candidate filed for party. | | |
| 2 | No candidate filed for party. | | |
| 3 | Joe Kujawa | Unopposed | |
| 4 | Jake Banta | 3,702 | 41.98 |
| 4 | Jason Monn | 2,321 | 26.32 |
| 4 | Greg Hayes | 1,072 | 12.16 |
| 4 | Joe Cancilla | 773 | 8.77 |
| 4 | Jennifer Lesher | 732 | 8.3 |
| 4 | John Diamond | 201 | 2.28 |
| 5 | Barry Jozwiak | 5,161 | 58.1 |
| 5 | David Golowski | 3,712 | 41.79 |
| 6 | Brad Roae | Unopposed | |
| 7 | Parke Wentling | Unopposed | |
| 8 | Aaron Bernstine | 5,826 | 48.96 |
| 8 | John L. Kennedy | 4,887 | 41.07 |
| 8 | Eric Ditullio | 1,164 | 9.78 |
| 9 | Marla Gallo Brown | 3,192 | 42.62 |
| 9 | Nick Kerin | 2,896 | 38.66 |
| 9 | Darryl Audia | 1,352 | 18.05 |
| 10 | No candidate filed for party. | | |
| 11 | Marci Mustello | 7,470 | 74.84 |
| 11 | Jennifer Steele | 2,494 | 24.99 |
| 12 | Stephenie Scialabba | 4,805 | 47.45 |
| 12 | Gregg Semel | 3,035 | 29.97 |
| 12 | Scott Timko | 1,856 | 18.33 |
| 13 | John Lawrence | 4,891 | 62.87 |
| 13 | Carmela Ciliberti | 2,871 | 36.91 |
| 14 | Jim E. Marshall | Unopposed | |
| 15 | Josh Kail | Unopposed | |
| 16 | Rico Elmore | Unopposed | |
| 17 | Tim Bonner | Unopposed | |
| 18 | K.C. Tomlinson | Unopposed | |
| 19 | No candidate filed for party. | | |
| 20 | No candidate filed for party. | | |
| 21 | Frank Perman | Unopposed | |
| 22 | Robert Smith | Unopposed | |
| 23 | No candidate filed for party. | | |
| 24 | No candidate filed for party. | | |
| 25 | Stephen Schlauch | 2,487 | 50.97 |
| 25 | John Ritter | 2,364 | 48.45 |
| 26 | Tim Hennessey | Unopposed | |
| 27 | Ed Brosky | 2,016 | 55.91 |
| 27 | Tim Walker | 1,540 | 42.71 |
| 28 | Rob Mercuri | Unopposed | |
| 29 | Diane Smith | Unopposed | |
| 30 | Cindy Kirk | 6,389 | 81.11 |
| 30 | Thomas Fodi | 1,455 | 18.47 |
| 31 | Bernie Sauer | 4,825 | 53.7 |
| 31 | Jennifer Spillane | 4,131 | 45.98 |
| 32 | No candidate filed for party. | | |
| 33 | Ted Tomson | Unopposed | |
| 34 | No candidate filed for party. | | |
| 35 | Donald Nevills | Unopposed | |
| 36 | No candidate filed for party. | | |
| 37 | Mindy Fee | Unopposed | |
| 38 | No candidate filed for party. | | |
| 39 | Andrew Kuzma | 4,308 | 58.54 |
| 39 | Mike Puskaric | 3,032 | 41.2 |
| 40 | Natalie Mihalek | 5,354 | 53.98 |
| 40 | Steve Renz | 4,550 | 45.87 |
| 41 | Brett Miller | Unopposed | |
| 42 | No candidate filed for party. | | |
| 43 | Keith Greiner | Unopposed | |
| 44 | Valerie Gaydos | Unopposed | |
| 45 | Michael Pendel | Unopposed | |
| 46 | Jason Ortitay | Unopposed | |
| 47 | Joe D'Orsie | 5,178 | 59.61 |
| 47 | Keith J. Gillespie | 3,491 | 40.19 |
| 48 | Tim O'Neal | Unopposed | |
| 49 | Anne Rivers | Unopposed | |
| 50 | Bud Cook | Unopposed | |
| 51 | Matthew Dowling | 3,637 | 53.69 |
| 51 | Ryan J. Porupski | 2,408 | 39.81 |
| 52 | Ryan Warner | Unopposed | |
| 53 | Jennifer Neha Sodha | Unopposed | |
| 54 | Allen Anderson | Unopposed | |
| 55 | Jill Cooper | 4,560 | 48.91 |
| 55 | Jason Silvis | 3,937 | 41.95 |
| 55 | Michelle A. Schmidt | 838 | 8.93 |
| 56 | George Dunbar | 6,954 | 78.73 |
| 56 | Sam Wright | 1,855 | 21 |
| 57 | Eric Nelson | Unopposed | |
| 58 | Eric Davanzo | Unopposed | |
| 59 | Leslie Rossi | Unopposed | |
| 60 | Abby Major | Unopposed | |
| 61 | Jessie Bradica | Unopposed | |
| 62 | James Struzzi | Unopposed | |
| 63 | Donna Oberlander | Unopposed | |
| 64 | Lee James | Unopposed | |
| 65 | Kathy Rapp | Unopposed | |
| 66 | Brian Smith | Unopposed | |
| 67 | Martin T. Causer | 7,999 | 84.19 |
| 67 | Robert W. Rossman | 1,486 | 15.64 |
| 68 | Clint Owlett | Unopposed | |
| 69 | Carl Walker Metzgar | Unopposed | |
| 70 | Arthur Bustard | Unopposed | |
| 71 | James Rigby | Unopposed | |
| 72 | Renae Billow | Unopposed | |
| 73 | Dallas Kephart | 6,072 | 61.75 |
| 73 | Derek A. Walker | 2,604 | 26.48 |
| 73 | John A. Sobel | 1,152 | 11.72 |
| 74 | Dale Hensel | Unopposed | |
| 75 | Michael Armanini | Unopposed | |
| 76 | Stephanie Borowicz | Unopposed | |
| 77 | Steve Yetsko | Unopposed | |
| 78 | Jesse Topper | Unopposed | |
| 79 | Louis Schmitt Jr. | Unopposed | |
| 80 | Jim Gregory | 9,635 | 78.48 |
| 80 | Trish Haight | 2,624 | 21.37 |
| 81 | Rich Irvin | 8,360 | 71.74 |
| 81 | Andrea L. Speck | 3,251 | 27.9 |
| 82 | Justin Behrens | Unopposed | |
| 83 | Jamie Flick | 4,146 | 50.95 |
| 83 | Ann Kaufman | 3,975 | 48.85 |
| 84 | Joe Hamm | Unopposed | |
| 85 | David H. Rowe | Unopposed | |
| 86 | Perry A. Stambaugh | 7,033 | 55 |
| 86 | John D. Hershey | 5,714 | 44.69 |
| 87 | Thomas Kutz | 5,762 | 53.83 |
| 87 | Eric Clancy | 4,905 | 45.82 |
| 88 | Sheryl M. Delozier | Unopposed | |
| 89 | Rob Kauffman | Unopposed | |
| 90 | Paul Schemel | Unopposed | |
| 91 | Dan Moul | Unopposed | |
| 92 | Dawn Keefer | Unopposed | |
| 93 | Paul M. Jones | Unopposed | |
| 94 | Wendy Fink | 5,429 | 55.55 |
| 94 | Stan Saylor | 4,317 | 44.17 |
| 95 | No candidate filed for party. | | |
| 96 | April Weaver | Unopposed | |
| 97 | Steven Mentzer | Unopposed | |
| 98 | Tom Jones | 5,935 | 50.25 |
| 98 | Lu Ann Fahndrich | 3,292 | 27.87 |
| 98 | Faith Bucks | 2,566 | 21.73 |
| 99 | David H. Zimmerman | Unopposed | |
| 100 | Bryan Cutler | 6,161 | 70.19 |
| 100 | Anne Weston | 2,608 | 29.71 |
| 101 | John A. Schlegel | Unopposed | |
| 102 | Russ Diamond | Unopposed | |
| 103 | David D. Buell | 3,708 | 71.6 |
| 103 | Jennie Jenkins-Dallas | 1,431 | 27.63 |
| 104 | No candidate filed for party. | | |
| 105 | No candidate filed for party. | | |
| 106 | Tom Mehaffie | Unopposed | |
| 107 | Joanne Stehr | 5,029 | 53.3 |
| 107 | Ron Tanney | 4,382 | 46.44 |
| 108 | Lynda Schlegel-Culver | Unopposed | |
| 109 | Robert Leadbeter | 4,225 | 46.38 |
| 109 | Janine M. Penman | 2,233 | 24.51 |
| 109 | Aaron Kline | 2,170 | 23.82 |
| 109 | Joseph M. Martin | 464 | 5.09 |
| 110 | Tina Pickett | Unopposed | |
| 111 | Jonathan Fritz | Unopposed | |
| 112 | William Torbeck | Unopposed | |
| 113 | Aaron Sepkowski | Unopposed | |
| 114 | Colin Healey | Unopposed | |
| 115 | Krista Paolucci | Unopposed | |
| 116 | Dane Watro | 2,188 | 40.41 |
| 116 | Mike LaRocca | 956 | 17.65 |
| 116 | John Chura | 809 | 14.94 |
| 116 | Gary Perna | 594 | 10.97 |
| 116 | Nico R. Makuta | 471 | 8.7 |
| 116 | Dyllan Angelo-Ogurkis | 382 | 7.05 |
| 117 | Mike Cabell | 3,541 | 32.32 |
| 117 | Eugene Ziemba | 2,731 | 24.92 |
| 117 | Clint J. Lanning | 2,701 | 24.65 |
| 117 | Michael Stash | 1,216 | 11.1 |
| 117 | Andy Gegaris | 747 | 6.82 |
| 118 | James May | 3,719 | 57.2 |
| 118 | John Lombardo | 2,741 | 42.16 |
| 119 | Alec Ryncavage | 3,369 | 54.46 |
| 119 | Tom Williams | 2,809 | 45.41 |
| 120 | Aaron Kaufer | Unopposed | |
| 121 | Eryn Harvey | Unopposed | |
| 122 | Doyle Heffley | Unopposed | |
| 123 | Timothy Twardzik | Unopposed | |
| 124 | Jamie Barton | 6,650 | 68.32 |
| 124 | Jill Saunders | 2,247 | 23.08 |
| 124 | Elle Rulavage | 906 | 9.31 |
| 125 | Joe Kerwin | Unopposed | |
| 126 | James Oswald | Unopposed | |
| 127 | Vincent Gagliardo Jr. | Unopposed | |
| 128 | Mark M. Gillen | Unopposed | |
| 129 | Barry Llewellyn | Unopposed | |
| 130 | David Maloney | Unopposed | |
| 131 | Milou Mackenzie | Unopposed | |
| 132 | No candidate filed for party. | | |
| 133 | No candidate filed for party. | | |
| 134 | Brent Labenburg | Unopposed | |
| 135 | No candidate filed for party. | | |
| 136 | No candidate filed for party. | | |
| 137 | Joe Emrick | Unopposed | |
| 138 | Ann Flood | Unopposed | |
| 139 | Joseph Adams | 3,921 | 43.23 |
| 139 | Robert Beierle | 3,009 | 33.18 |
| 139 | Theo Balu | 2,129 | 23.47 |
| 140 | No candidate filed for party. | | |
| 141 | Kelly Bellerby-Allen | Unopposed | |
| 142 | Joseph Hogan | Unopposed | |
| 143 | Shelby Labs | Unopposed | |
| 144 | Todd Polinchock | Unopposed | |
| 145 | Craig Staats | Unopposed | |
| 146 | Thomas Neafcy | 973 | 73.38 |
| 147 | Donna Scheuren | Unopposed | |
| 148 | Fran O'Donnell | 431 | 67.66 |
| 149 | Nancy Price | 507 | 72.22 |
| 150 | Beth Ann Bittner Mazza | Unopposed | |
| 151 | Todd Stephens | Unopposed | |
| 152 | John Weinrich Sr. | Unopposed | |
| 153 | Larry Ulrich | Unopposed | |
| 154 | Angelina Banks | Unopposed | |
| 155 | Kyle Scribner | Unopposed | |
| 156 | Heidi Vanderwaal | Unopposed | |
| 157 | Sarah Marvin | Unopposed | |
| 158 | Leon Spencer | Unopposed | |
| 159 | Ruth Moton | Unopposed | |
| 160 | Craig Williams | Unopposed | |
| 161 | Edward Mongelluzzo | Unopposed | |
| 162 | Michelle Mattus | Unopposed | |
| 163 | Kenneth P. Rucci | Unopposed | |
| 164 | No candidate filed for party. | | |
| 165 | No candidate filed for party. | | |
| 166 | Kimberly Razzano | Unopposed | |
| 167 | Gail Newman | 4,211 | 66.82 |
| 167 | Melissa Dicranian | 2,052 | 32.56 |
| 168 | Christopher B. Quinn | Unopposed | |
| 169 | Kate Klunk | 7,449 | 82.54 |
| 169 | Matthew Smith | 1,553 | 17.21 |
| 170 | Martina White | Unopposed | |
| 171 | Kerry Benninghoff | Unopposed | |
| 172 | Al Taubenberger | Unopposed | |
| 173 | No candidate filed for party. | | |
| 174 | No candidate filed for party. | | |
| 175 | No candidate filed for party. | | |
| 176 | Jack Rader | Unopposed | |
| 177 | Mark Lavelle | Unopposed | |
| 178 | Kristin Marcell | Unopposed | |
| 179 | No candidate filed for party. | | |
| 180 | No candidate filed for party. | | |
| 181 | No candidate filed for party. | | |
| 182 | Albert Robles | Unopposed | |
| 183 | Zach Mako | Unopposed | |
| 184 | Marjilyn Murray | Unopposed | |
| 185 | No candidate filed for party. | | |
| 186 | No candidate filed for party. | | |
| 187 | Ryan Mackenzie | 5,624 | 61.28 |
| 187 | Gary Day | 3,547 | 38.65 |
| 188 | No candidate filed for party. | | |
| 189 | Steve Ertle | 2,107 | 57.85 |
| 189 | John Petrizzo | 1,532 | 42.06 |
| 190 | No candidate filed for party. | | |
| 191 | No candidate filed for party. | | |
| 192 | No candidate filed for party. | | |
| 193 | Torren Ecker | Unopposed | |
| 194 | No candidate filed for party. | | |
| 195 | No candidate filed for party. | | |
| 196 | Seth Grove | Unopposed | |
| 197 | No candidate filed for party. | | |
| 198 | No candidate filed for party. | | |
| 199 | Barbara Gleim | Unopposed | |
| 200 | Kionna West | Unopposed | |
| 201 | No candidate filed for party. | | |
| 202 | No candidate filed for party. | | |
| 203 | No candidate filed for party. | | |

== General election ==
=== Predictions ===
| Source | Ranking | As of |
|---|---|---|
| Sabato's Crystal Ball | Likely R | May 19, 2022 |

=== Overview ===
| Affiliation | Candidates | Votes | Vote % | Seats won |
|---|---|---|---|---|
| Democratic | 156 | 2,258,892 | 45.82% | 102 |
| Republican | 167 | 2,638,894 | 53.53% | 101 |
| Libertarian | 13 | 23,614 | 0.48% | 0 |
| Green | 2 | 6,500 | 0.13% | 0 |
| Independent | 2 | 1,826 | 0.04% | 0 |
| Total | 341 | 4,929,726 | 100.00% | 203 |

=== Close races ===
Districts where the margin of victory was under 10%:

1. District 142, 0.2%
2. District 151, 0.2% (gain)
3. District 144, 1.6% (gain)
4. District 137, 2.3%
5. District 7, 2.8% (gain)
6. District 18, 4.6%
7. District 118, 4.6%
8. District 160, 4.6%
9. District 9, 5.8% (gain)
10. District 143, 6.2%
11. District 121, 8.8%
12. District 72, 8.8%
13. District 33, 9% (gain)
14. District 88, 9.4%
15. District 147, 9.4%
16. District 131, 9.6%

=== District breakdown ===
| District | Party | Incumbent | Status | Party | Candidate | Votes | % |
|---|---|---|---|---|---|---|---|
| 1 | Democratic | Pat Harkins | Re-elected | Democratic | Pat Harkins | 13,327 | 79.7 |
| 1 | Democratic | Pat Harkins | Re-elected | Libertarian | Michael Thomas | 3,394 | 20.3 |
| 2 | Democratic | Robert Merski | Re-elected | Democratic | Robert Merski | 16,242 | 64.2 |
| 2 | Democratic | Robert Merski | Re-elected | Republican | Michael Pace | 9,068 | 35.8 |
| 3 | Democratic | Ryan Bizzarro | Re-elected | Democratic | Ryan Bizzarro | 19,934 | 64.1 |
| 3 | Democratic | Ryan Bizzarro | Re-elected | Republican | Joseph Kujawa | 11,179 | 35.9 |
| 4 | Republican | Curt Sonney | Retired | Republican | Jake Banta | 16,375 | 61.4 |
| 4 | Republican | Curt Sonney | Retired | Democratic | Chelsea Oliver | 10,276 | 38.6 |
| 5 | Republican | Barry Jozwiak | Re-elected | Republican | Barry Jozwiak | 21,220 | 100 |
| 6 | Republican | Brad Roae | Re-elected | Republican | Brad Roae | 17,610 | 68.6 |
| 6 | Republican | Brad Roae | Re-elected | Democratic | Nerissa Galt | 8,056 | 31.4 |
| 7 | Democratic | Mark Longietti | Retired | Republican | Parke Wentling | 13,559 | 51.4 |
| 7 | Democratic | Mark Longietti | Retired | Democratic | Timothy McGonigle | 12,818 | 48.6 |
| 8 | Republican | Tim Bonner | Elected (Redistricted to the 17th district) | Republican | Aaron Bernstine | 25,702 | 100 |
| 9 | Democratic | Chris Sainato | Defeated | Republican | Marla Gallo Brown | 13,721 | 52.9 |
| 9 | Democratic | Chris Sainato | Defeated | Democratic | Chris Sainato | 12,219 | 47.1 |
| 10 | Republican | Aaron Bernstine | Elected (Redistricted to the 8th district) | Democratic | Amen Brown | 15,874 | 100 |
| 11 | Republican | Marci Mustello | Re-elected | Republican | Marci Mustello | 23,579 | 100 |
| 12 | Republican | Daryl Metcalfe | Retired | Republican | Stephenie Scialabba | 20,996 | 62.3 |
| 12 | Republican | Daryl Metcalfe | Retired | Democratic | Robert Vigue | 12,734 | 37.8 |
| 13 | Republican | John Lawrence | Re-elected | Republican | John Lawrence | 16,325 | 59.4 |
| 13 | Republican | John Lawrence | Re-elected | Democratic | David Cunningham | 11,181 | 40.7 |
| 14 | Republican | Jim E. Marshall | Re-elected | Republican | Jim E. Marshall | 19,781 | 67.8 |
| 14 | Republican | Jim E. Marshall | Re-elected | Democratic | Bruce Carper | 9,402 | 32.2 |
| 15 | Republican | Josh Kail | Re-elected | Republican | Josh Kail | 22,375 | 100 |
| 16 | Democratic | Robert Matzie | Re-elected | Democratic | Robert Matzie | 15,104 | 56.7 |
| 16 | Democratic | Robert Matzie | Re-elected | Republican | Rico Elmore | 11,534 | 43.3 |
| 17 | Republican | Parke Wentling | Elected (Redistricted into the 7th district) | Republican | Tim Bonner | 22,001 | 100 |
| 18 | Republican | K.C. Tomlinson | Re-elected | Republican | K.C. Tomlinson | 12,558 | 52.3 |
| 18 | Republican | K.C. Tomlinson | Re-elected | Democratic | Laurie Smith | 11,459 | 47.7 |
| 19 | Democratic | Aerion Abney | Re-elected | Democratic | Aerion Abney | 16,296 | 100 |
| 20 | Democratic | Emily Kinkead | Re-elected | Democratic | Emily Kinkead | 17,783 | 61.1 |
| 20 | Democratic | Emily Kinkead | Re-elected | Republican | Matt Kruth | 11,313 | 38.9 |
| 21 | Democratic | Sara Innamorato | Re-elected | Democratic | Sara Innamorato | 20,225 | 63.6 |
| 21 | Democratic | Sara Innamorato | Re-elected | Republican | Frank Perman | 11,601 | 36.4 |
| 22 | Democratic | Peter Schweyer | Elected (Redistricted into the 134th district) | Democratic | Joshua Siegel | 6,442 | 63.8 |
| 22 | Democratic | Peter Schweyer | Elected (Redistricted into the 134th district) | Republican | Robert Smith | 3,662 | 36.2 |
| 23 | Democratic | Dan Frankel | Re-elected | Democratic | Dan Frankel | 22,340 | 88.2 |
| 23 | Democratic | Dan Frankel | Re-elected | Green | Jay Ting Walker | 2,983 | 11.8 |
| 24 | Democratic | Martell Covington | Lost Primary | Democratic | La'Tasha D. Mayes | 21,832 | 100 |
| 25 | Democratic | Brandon Markosek | Re-elected | Democratic | Brandon Markosek | 16,655 | 60.2 |
| 25 | Democratic | Brandon Markosek | Re-elected | Republican | Stephen Schlauch | 11,025 | 39.8 |
| 26 | Republican | Tim Hennessey | Defeated | Democratic | Paul Friel | 17,853 | 57.0 |
| 26 | Republican | Tim Hennessey | Defeated | Republican | Tim Hennessey | 13,463 | 43.0 |
| 27 | Democratic | Dan Deasy | Re-elected | Democratic | Dan Deasy | 18,374 | 68.9 |
| 27 | Democratic | Dan Deasy | Re-elected | Republican | Ed Brosky | 8,263 | 31.1 |
| 28 | Republican | Rob Mercuri | Re-elected | Republican | Rob Mercuri | 18,376 | 56.0 |
| 28 | Republican | Rob Mercuri | Re-elected | Democratic | Alison Duncan | 14,432 | 44.0 |
| 29 | Republican | Meghan Schroeder | Retired | Democratic | Tim Brennan | 21,345 | 55.8 |
| 29 | Republican | Meghan Schroeder | Retired | Republican | Diane Smith | 15,601 | 40.9 |
| 29 | Republican | Meghan Schroeder | Retired | Independent | Robert Ronky | 1,243 | 3.3 |
| 30 | Republican | Lori Mizgorski | Ran for state senate | Democratic | Arvind Venkat | 18,531 | 54.6 |
| 30 | Republican | Lori Mizgorski | Ran for state senate | Republican | Cindy Kirk | 15,041 | 44.4 |
| 31 | Democratic | Perry Warren | Re-elected | Democratic | Perry Warren | 23,994 | 59.7 |
| 31 | Democratic | Perry Warren | Re-elected | Republican | Bernie Sauer | 15,603 | 38.8 |
| 32 | Democratic | Anthony M. DeLuca | Deceased (name remained on ballot) | Democratic | Anthony M. DeLuca | 21,459 | 85.1 |
| 32 | Democratic | Anthony M. DeLuca | Deceased (name remained on ballot) | Green | Queonia Livingston | 3,517 | 13.9 |
| 33 | Republican | Carrie Delrosso | Ran for Lt. Governor (Re-districted into the 32nd district) | Democratic | Mandy Steele | 15,679 | 54.00 |
| 33 | Republican | Carrie Delrosso | Ran for Lt. Governor (Re-districted into the 32nd district) | Republican | Ted Tomson | 13,042 | 45.00 |
| 34 | Democratic | Summer Lee | Ran for U.S. House; Re-elected | Democratic | Summer Lee | 22,573 | 100 |
| 35 | Democratic | Austin Davis | Ran for Lt. Governor; Re-elected | Democratic | Austin Davis | 15,042 | 65.3 |
| 35 | Democratic | Austin Davis | Ran for Lt. Governor; Re-elected | Republican | Donald Nevills | 7,770 | 33.7 |
| 36 | Democratic | Jessica Benham | Re-elected | Democratic | Jessica Benham | 17,121 | 77.9 |
| 36 | Democratic | Jessica Benham | Re-elected | Libertarian | Ross Sylvester | 4,642 | 21.1 |
| 37 | Republican | Mindy Fee | Re-elected | Republican | Mindy Fee | 25,535 | 100 |
| 38 | Democratic | Nick Pisciottano | Re-elected | Democratic | Nick Pisciottano | 20,196 | 100 |
| 39 | Republican | Mike Puskaric | Lost Primary | Republican | Andrew Kuzma | 18,009 | 58.7 |
| 39 | Republican | Mike Puskaric | Lost Primary | Democratic | Rick Self | 12,355 | 40.3 |
| 40 | Republican | Natalie Mihalek | Re-elected | Republican | Natalie Mihalek | 20,263 | 56.3 |
| 40 | Republican | Natalie Mihalek | Re-elected | Democratic | Chris Todd | 15,307 | 42.6 |
| 41 | Republican | Brett Miller | Re-elected | Republican | Brett Miller | 18,402 | 74.3 |
| 41 | Republican | Brett Miller | Re-elected | Libertarian | Favyan Asia | 6,105 | 24.7 |
| 42 | Democratic | Dan Miller | Re-elected | Democratic | Dan Miller | 23,080 | 67.3 |
| 42 | Democratic | Dan Miller | Re-elected | Republican | Pat Tylka | 10,878 | 31.7 |
| 43 | Republican | Keith Greiner | Re-elected | Republican | Keith Greiner | 18,511 | 100 |
| 44 | Republican | Valerie Gaydos | Re-elected | Republican | Valerie Gaydos | 16,620 | 54.6 |
| 44 | Republican | Valerie Gaydos | Re-elected | Democratic | Debbie Turici | 13,524 | 44.4 |
| 45 | Democratic | Anita Astorino Kulik | Re-elected | Democratic | Anita Astorino Kulik | 17,945 | 62.5 |
| 45 | Democratic | Anita Astorino Kulik | Re-elected | Republican | Michael Pendel | 10,485 | 36.5 |
| 46 | Republican | Jason Ortitay | Re-elected | Republican | Jason Ortitay | 21,727 | 100 |
| 47 | Republican | Keith J. Gillespie | Lost primary | Republican | Joe D'Orsie | 19,305 | 100 |
| 48 | Republican | Tim O'Neal | Re-elected | Republican | Tim O'Neal | 20,091 | 100 |
| 49 | Republican | Bud Cook | Elected (Redistricted into the 50th district) | Democratic | Ismail Smith-Wade-El | 11,045 | 66.00 |
| 49 | Republican | Bud Cook | Elected (Redistricted into the 50th district) | Republican | Anne Rivers | 5,511 | 33.00 |
| 50 | Democratic | Pam Snyder | Retired | Republican | Bud Cook | 14,999 | 61.3 |
| 50 | Democratic | Pam Snyder | Retired | Democratic | Doug Mason | 9,210 | 37.7 |
| 51 | Republican | Matt Dowling | Withdrew after DUI charge | Republican | Charity Grimm Krupa | 13,244 | 61.3 |
| 51 | Republican | Matt Dowling | Withdrew after DUI charge | Democratic | Richard Ringer | 8,140 | 37.7 |
| 52 | Republican | Ryan Warner | Re-elected | Republican | Ryan Warner | 17,808 | 100 |
| 53 | Democratic | Steve Malagari | Re-elected | Democratic | Steve Malagari | 16,568 | 60.5 |
| 53 | Democratic | Steve Malagari | Re-elected | Republican | Jennifer Neha Sodha | 10,560 | 38.5 |
| 54 | Republican | Robert Brooks | Retired | Democratic | Greg Scott | 14,373 | 70.9 |
| 54 | Republican | Robert Brooks | Retired | Republican | Allen Anderson | 5,684 | 28.1 |
| 55 | Republican | Jason Silvis | Lost Primary | Republican | Jill Cooper | 18,523 | 60.9 |
| 55 | Republican | Jason Silvis | Lost Primary | Democratic | Scott Gauss | 11,585 | 38.1 |
| 56 | Republican | George Dunbar | Re-elected | Republican | George Dunbar | 23,664 | 100 |
| 57 | Republican | Eric Nelson | Re-elected | Republican | Eric Nelson | 21,812 | 100 |
| 58 | Republican | Eric Davanzo | Re-elected | Republican | Eric Davanzo | 17,527 | 62.6 |
| 58 | Republican | Eric Davanzo | Re-elected | Democratic | Ken Bach | 10,192 | 36.4 |
| 59 | Republican | Leslie Rossi | Re-elected | Republican | Leslie Rossi | 22,149 | 100 |
| 60 | Republican | Abby Major | Re-elected | Republican | Abby Major | 19,056 | 68.2 |
| 60 | Republican | Abby Major | Re-elected | Democratic | Bob George | 8,604 | 30.8 |
| 61 | Democratic | Liz Hanbidge | Re-elected | Democratic | Liz Hanbidge | 21,425 | 61.5 |
| 61 | Democratic | Liz Hanbidge | Re-elected | Republican | Jessie Bradica | 13,088 | 37.5 |
| 62 | Republican | James Struzzi | Re-elected | Republican | James Struzzi | 18,147 | 69.8 |
| 62 | Republican | James Struzzi | Re-elected | Democratic | Brian Doyle | 7,604 | 29.2 |
| 63 | Republican | Donna Oberlander | Re-elected | Republican | Donna Oberlander | 23,672 | 100 |
| 64 | Republican | Lee James | Re-elected | Republican | Lee James | 20,245 | 100 |
| 65 | Republican | Kathy Rapp | Re-elected | Republican | Kathy Rapp | 20,202 | 100 |
| 66 | Republican | Brian Smith | Re-elected | Republican | Brian Smith | 21,506 | 100 |
| 67 | Republican | Martin Causer | Re-elected | Republican | Martin Causer | 21,096 | 100 |
| 68 | Republican | Clint Owlett | Re-elected | Republican | Clint Owlett | 22,628 | 100 |
| 69 | Republican | Carl Walker Metzgar | Re-elected | Republican | Carl Walker Metzgar | 25,715 | 99 |
| 69 | Republican | Carl Walker Metzgar | Re-elected | Democratic | Kimberly Felan (Write-in) | 388 | 1 |
| 70 | Democratic | Matthew Bradford | Re-elected | Democratic | Matthew Bradford | 20,035 | 60.3 |
| 70 | Democratic | Matthew Bradford | Re-elected | Republican | Arthur Bustard | 12,865 | 38.7 |
| 71 | Republican | James Rigby | Re-elected | Republican | James Rigby | 23,196 | 100 |
| 72 | Democratic | Frank Burns | Re-elected | Democratic | Frank Burns | 14,060 | 53.4 |
| 72 | Democratic | Frank Burns | Re-elected | Republican | Renae Billow | 11,757 | 44.6 |
| 73 | Republican | Tommy Sankey | Retired | Republican | Dallas Kephart | 21,121 | 100 |
| 74 | Democratic | Dan K. Williams | Re-elected | Democratic | Dan K. Williams | 13,288 | 55.5 |
| 74 | Democratic | Dan K. Williams | Re-elected | Republican | Dale Hensel | 10,346 | 43.2 |
| 75 | Republican | Michael Armanini | Re-elected | Republican | Michael Armanini | 20,459 | 75.00 |
| 75 | Republican | Michael Armanini | Re-elected | Democratic | Erica Vogt | 6,431 | 23.6 |
| 76 | Republican | Stephanie Borowicz | Re-elected | Republican | Stephanie Borowicz | 15,776 | 66.7 |
| 76 | Republican | Stephanie Borowicz | Re-elected | Democratic | Denise Maris | 7,627 | 32.3 |
| 77 | Democratic | Scott Conklin | Re-elected | Democratic | Scott Conklin | 14,851 | 61.6 |
| 77 | Democratic | Scott Conklin | Re-elected | Republican | Steve Yetsko | 9,003 | 37.4 |
| 78 | Republican | Jesse Topper | Re-elected | Republican | Jesse Topper | 25,655 | 100 |
| 79 | Republican | Louis Schmitt Jr. | Re-elected | Republican | Louis Schmitt Jr. | 17,507 | 100 |
| 80 | Republican | Jim Gregory | Re-elected | Republican | Jim Gregory | 22,764 | 80.1 |
| 80 | Republican | Jim Gregory | Re-elected | Democratic | Kimberly Capenos | 5,367 | 18.9 |
| 81 | Republican | Rich Irvin | Re-elected | Republican | Rich Irvin | 20,424 | 74.00 |
| 81 | Republican | Rich Irvin | Re-elected | Democratic | Ian Kidd | 6,759 | 24.5 |
| 82 | Republican | John D. Hershey | Lost primary (Redistricted into the 86th district) | Democratic | Paul Takac | 12,739 | 55.8 |
| 82 | Republican | John D. Hershey | Lost primary (Redistricted into the 86th district) | Republican | Justin Behrens | 9,870 | 43.2 |
| 83 | Republican | Jeff Wheeland | Resigned | Republican | Jamie Flick | 16,835 | 100 |
| 84 | Republican | Joe Hamm | Re-elected | Republican | Joe Hamm | 25,951 | 100 |
| 85 | Republican | David H. Rowe | Re-elected | Republican | David H. Rowe | 21,232 | 100 |
| 86 | Republican | Perry A. Stambaugh | Re-elected | Republican | Perry A. Stambaugh | 22,535 | 100 |
| 87 | Republican | Greg Rothman | Ran for State Senate | Republican | Thomas Kutz | 18,878 | 57.7 |
| 87 | Republican | Greg Rothman | Ran for State Senate | Democratic | Kristal Markle | 13,510 | 41.3 |
| 88 | Republican | Sheryl M. Delozier | Re-elected | Republican | Sheryl M. Delozier | 16,722 | 54.2 |
| 88 | Republican | Sheryl M. Delozier | Re-elected | Democratic | Sara Agerton | 13,832 | 44.8 |
| 89 | Republican | Rob Kauffman | Re-elected | Republican | Rob Kauffman | 21,928 | 100 |
| 90 | Republican | Paul Schemel | Re-elected | Republican | Paul Schemel | 23,303 | 100 |
| 91 | Republican | Dan Moul | Re-elected | Republican | Dan Moul | 18,988 | 63.2 |
| 91 | Republican | Dan Moul | Re-elected | Democratic | Marty Qually | 10,025 | 33.4 |
| 91 | Republican | Dan Moul | Re-elected | Libertarian | Neil Belliveau | 727 | 2.4 |
| 92 | Republican | Dawn Keefer | Re-elected | Republican | Dawn Keefer | 21,873 | 68.6 |
| 92 | Republican | Dawn Keefer | Re-elected | Democratic | Dan Almoney | 9,051 | 28.4 |
| 93 | Republican | Paul M. Jones | Re-elected | Republican | Paul M. Jones | 18,752 | 61.5 |
| 93 | Republican | Paul M. Jones | Re-elected | Democratic | Chris Rodkey | 9,961 | 32.6 |
| 94 | Republican | Stan Saylor | Lost primary | Republican | Wendy Fink | 19,599 | 100 |
| 95 | Democratic | Carol Hill-Evans | Re-elected | Democratic | Carol Hill-Evans | 11,266 | 100 |
| 96 | Democratic | Mike Sturla | Re-elected | Democratic | Mike Sturla | 17,250 | 60.5 |
| 96 | Democratic | Mike Sturla | Re-elected | Republican | April Weaver | 10,988 | 38.5 |
| 97 | Republican | Steven Mentzer | Re-elected | Republican | Steven Mentzer | 23,282 | 100 |
| 98 | Republican | David Hickernell | Retired | Republican | Tom Jones | 18,910 | 61.2 |
| 98 | Republican | David Hickernell | Retired | Democratic | Mark Temons | 10,718 | 34.7 |
| 98 | Republican | David Hickernell | Retired | Libertarian | Josh Gerber | 937 | 3.00 |
| 99 | Republican | David H. Zimmerman | Re-elected | Republican | David H. Zimmerman | 18,057 | 70.7 |
| 99 | Republican | David H. Zimmerman | Re-elected | Democratic | Joshua Caltagirone | 7,220 | 28.3 |
| 100 | Republican | Bryan Cutler | Re-elected | Republican | Bryan Cutler | 18,356 | 100 |
| 101 | Republican | Frank Ryan | Retired | Republican | John A. Schlegel | 14,072 | 61.5 |
| 101 | Republican | Frank Ryan | Retired | Democratic | Cavi Miller | 8,569 | 37.5 |
| 102 | Republican | Russ Diamond | Re-elected | Republican | Russ Diamond | 19,142 | 69.4 |
| 102 | Republican | Russ Diamond | Re-elected | Democratic | Laura Quick | 8,170 | 29.6 |
| 103 | Democratic | Patty Kim | Re-elected | Democratic | Patty Kim | 16,193 | 64.8 |
| 103 | Democratic | Patty Kim | Re-elected | Republican | David Buell | 8,527 | 34.1 |
| 104 | Republican | Sue Helm | Retired | Democratic | Dave Madsen | 11,718 | 70.00 |
| 105 | Republican | Andrew Lewis | Retired (Redistricted into the 104th district) | Democratic | Justin C. Fleming | 16,399 | 62.9 |
| 105 | Republican | Andrew Lewis | Retired (Redistricted into the 104th district) | Republican | Therese Kenley | 9,406 | 36.1 |
| 106 | Republican | Tom Mehaffie | Re-elected | Republican | Tom Mehaffie | 21,985 | 100 |
| 107 | Republican | Kurt Masser | Retired | Republican | Joanne Stehr | 18,246 | 74.4 |
| 107 | Republican | Kurt Masser | Retired | Democratic | Ryan Mock | 6,025 | 24.6 |
| 108 | Republican | Lynda Schlegel-Culver | Re-elected | Republican | Lynda Schlegel-Culver | 21,915 | 100 |
| 109 | Republican | David R. Millard | Retired | Republican | Robert Leadbeter | 15,473 | 62.4 |
| 109 | Republican | David R. Millard | Retired | Democratic | Edward Giannattasio | 7,040 | 28.4 |
| 109 | Republican | David R. Millard | Retired | Libertarian | Thomas Anderson | 2,021 | 8.2 |
| 110 | Republican | Tina Pickett | Re-elected | Republican | Tina Pickett | 22,414 | 100 |
| 111 | Republican | Jonathan Fritz | Re-elected | Republican | Jonathan Fritz | 24,013 | 100 |
| 112 | Democratic | Kyle Mullins | Re-elected | Democratic | Kyle Mullins | 17,982 | 63.5 |
| 112 | Democratic | Kyle Mullins | Re-elected | Republican | William Torbeck | 10,033 | 35.5 |
| 113 | Democratic | Thom Welby | Retired | Democratic | Kyle Donahue | 12,082 | 58.7 |
| 113 | Democratic | Thom Welby | Retired | Republican | Aaron Sepkowski | 8,289 | 40.3 |
| 114 | Democratic | Bridget Malloy Kosierowski | Re-elected | Democratic | Bridget Malloy Kosierowski | 16,745 | 61.9 |
| 114 | Democratic | Bridget Malloy Kosierowski | Re-elected | Republican | David Burgerhoff | 10,036 | 37.1 |
| 115 | Democratic | Maureen Madden | Re-elected | Democratic | Maureen Madden | 11,462 | 55.2 |
| 115 | Democratic | Maureen Madden | Re-elected | Republican | Krista Paolucci | 8,898 | 42.9 |
| 116 | Republican | Robert Schnee | Retired (Redistricted) | Republican | Dane Watro | 9,773 | 67.6 |
| 116 | Republican | Robert Schnee | Retired (Redistricted) | Democratic | Yesenia Rodriguez | 4,531 | 31.4 |
| 117 | Republican | Karen Boback | Retired | Republican | Mike Cabell | 19,179 | 100 |
| 118 | Democratic | Michael B. Carroll | Retired | Democratic | Jim Haddock | 14,555 | 51.8 |
| 118 | Democratic | Michael B. Carroll | Retired | Republican | James May | 13,250 | 47.2 |
| 119 | Democratic | Gerald Mullery | Retired | Republican | Alec Ryncavage | 12,091 | 55.0 |
| 119 | Democratic | Gerald Mullery | Retired | Democratic | Vito Malacari | 9,689 | 44.0 |
| 120 | Republican | Aaron Kaufer | Re-elected | Republican | Aaron Kaufer | 17,321 | 65.3 |
| 120 | Republican | Aaron Kaufer | Re-elected | Democratic | Fern Leard | 8,919 | 33.7 |
| 121 | Democratic | Eddie Day Pashinski | Re-elected | Democratic | Eddie Day Pashinski | 8,801 | 53.9 |
| 121 | Democratic | Eddie Day Pashinski | Re-elected | Republican | Eryn Harvey | 7,365 | 45.1 |
| 122 | Republican | Doyle Heffley | Re-elected | Republican | Doyle Heffley | 18,627 | 70.9 |
| 122 | Republican | Doyle Heffley | Re-elected | Democratic | Richard Kost | 7,198 | 27.4 |
| 123 | Republican | Timothy Twardzik | Re-elected | Republican | Timothy Twardzik | 17,051 | 67.8 |
| 123 | Republican | Timothy Twardzik | Re-elected | Democratic | Kathleen Benyak | 7,849 | 31.2 |
| 124 | Republican | Jerry Knowles | Retired | Republican | Jamie Barton | 18,218 | 67.8 |
| 124 | Republican | Jerry Knowles | Retired | Democratic | Tina Burns | 8,350 | 31.1 |
| 125 | Republican | Joe Kerwin | Re-elected | Republican | Joe Kerwin | 24,038 | 100 |
| 126 | Democratic | Mark Rozzi | Re-elected | Democratic | Mark Rozzi | 11,613 | 63.3 |
| 126 | Democratic | Mark Rozzi | Re-elected | Republican | James Oswald | 6,539 | 35.7 |
| 127 | Democratic | Manny Guzman Jr. | Re-elected | Democratic | Manny Guzman Jr. | 7,114 | 65.6 |
| 127 | Democratic | Manny Guzman Jr. | Re-elected | Republican | Vincent Gagliardo Jr. | 3,617 | 33.4 |
| 128 | Republican | Mark M. Gillen | Re-elected | Republican | Mark M. Gillen | 20,923 | 100 |
| 129 | Republican | Jim Cox | Retired | Democratic | Johanny Cepeda-Freytiz | 11,242 | 57.8 |
| 129 | Republican | Jim Cox | Retired | Republican | Barry Llewellyn | 8,028 | 41.2 |
| 130 | Republican | David Maloney | Re-elected | Republican | David Maloney | 21,734 | 100 |
| 131 | Republican | Milou Mackenzie | Re-elected | Republican | Milou Mackenzie | 18,071 | 54.2 |
| 131 | Republican | Milou Mackenzie | Re-elected | Democratic | Kevin Branco | 14,854 | 44.6 |
| 132 | Democratic | Mike Schlossberg | Re-elected | Democratic | Mike Schlossberg | 16,135 | 60.2 |
| 132 | Democratic | Mike Schlossberg | Re-elected | Republican | Beth Finch | 9,824 | 36.7 |
| 132 | Democratic | Mike Schlossberg | Re-elected | Libertarian | Matt Schutter | 566 | 2.1 |
| 133 | Democratic | Jeanne McNeill | Re-elected | Democratic | Jeanne McNeill | 17,431 | 100 |
| 134 | Republican | Ryan Mackenzie | Elected (Redistricted into the 187th district) | Democratic | Peter Schweyer | 10,245 | 59.6 |
| 134 | Republican | Ryan Mackenzie | Elected (Redistricted into the 187th district) | Republican | Brent Labenberg | 6,746 | 39.2 |
| 135 | Democratic | Steve Samuelson | Re-elected | Democratic | Steve Samuelson | 17,180 | 100 |
| 136 | Democratic | Robert L. Freeman | Re-elected | Democratic | Robert L. Freeman | 14,932 | 100 |
| 137 | Republican | Joe Emrick | Re-elected | Republican | Joe Emrick | 15,619 | 50.4 |
| 137 | Republican | Joe Emrick | Re-elected | Democratic | Anna Thomas | 14,916 | 48.1 |
| 138 | Republican | Ann Flood | Re-elected | Republican | Ann Flood | 19,053 | 61.8 |
| 138 | Republican | Ann Flood | Re-elected | Democratic | Gene Hunter | 11,309 | 36.7 |
| 139 | Republican | Michael Peifer | Retired | Republican | Joseph Adams | 16,675 | 62.2 |
| 139 | Republican | Michael Peifer | Retired | Democratic | Meghan Rosenfeld | 9,871 | 36.8 |
| 140 | Democratic | John Galloway | Re-elected | Democratic | John Galloway | 17,970 | 100 |
| 141 | Democratic | Tina Davis | Re-elected | Democratic | Tina Davis | 14,787 | 63.6 |
| 141 | Democratic | Tina Davis | Re-elected | Republican | Kelly Bellerby-Allen | 7,771 | 33.4 |
| 141 | Democratic | Tina Davis | Re-elected | Libertarian | Anthony Portillo | 449 | 1.9 |
| 142 | Republican | Frank Farry | Ran for State Senate | Democratic | Mark Moffa | 15,357 | 49.4 |
| 142 | Republican | Frank Farry | Ran for State Senate | Republican | Joseph Hogan | 15,445 | 49.6 |
| 143 | Republican | Shelby Labs | Re-elected | Republican | Shelby Labs | 18,418 | 52.6 |
| 143 | Republican | Shelby Labs | Re-elected | Democratic | Gwendolyn Stoltz | 16,215 | 46.4 |
| 144 | Republican | Todd Polinchock | Defeated | Democratic | Brian Munroe | 16,123 | 50.3 |
| 144 | Republican | Todd Polinchock | Defeated | Republican | Todd Polinchock | 15,608 | 48.7 |
| 145 | Republican | Craig Staats | Re-elected | Republican | Craig Staats | 17,537 | 57.5 |
| 145 | Republican | Craig Staats | Re-elected | Democratic | Jim Miller | 12,127 | 39.7 |
| 145 | Republican | Craig Staats | Re-elected | Libertarian | Lula Vanliew | 541 | 1.8 |
| 146 | Democratic | Joe Ciresi | Re-elected | Democratic | Joe Ciresi | 16,091 | 61.2 |
| 146 | Democratic | Joe Ciresi | Re-elected | Republican | Thomas Neafcy | 9,935 | 37.8 |
| 147 | Republican | Tracy Pennycuick | Ran for State Senate | Republican | Donna Scheuren | 17,667 | 54.2 |
| 147 | Republican | Tracy Pennycuick | Ran for State Senate | Democratic | Alexandra Wisser | 14,626 | 44.8 |
| 148 | Democratic | Mary Jo Daley | Re-elected | Democratic | Mary Jo Daley | 27,486 | 75.6 |
| 148 | Democratic | Mary Jo Daley | Re-elected | Republican | Fran O'Donnell | 8,488 | 23.4 |
| 149 | Democratic | Tim Briggs | Re-elected | Democratic | Tim Briggs | 21,638 | 70.7 |
| 149 | Democratic | Tim Briggs | Re-elected | Republican | Nancy Price | 8,680 | 28.3 |
| 150 | Democratic | Joe Webster | Re-elected | Democratic | Joe Webster | 17,822 | 58.0 |
| 150 | Democratic | Joe Webster | Re-elected | Republican | Beth Ann Bittner Mazza | 12,610 | 41.0 |
| 151 | Republican | Todd Stephens | Defeated | Democratic | Melissa Cerrato | 16,805 | 49.6 |
| 151 | Republican | Todd Stephens | Defeated | Republican | Todd Stephens | 16,742 | 49.4 |
| 152 | Democratic | Nancy Guenst | Re-elected | Democratic | Nancy Guenst | 17,118 | 59.5 |
| 152 | Democratic | Nancy Guenst | Re-elected | Republican | John Weinrich Sr. | 11,384 | 39.9 |
| 153 | Democratic | Ben Sanchez | Re-elected | Democratic | Ben Sanchez | 22,600 | 68.1 |
| 153 | Democratic | Ben Sanchez | Re-elected | Republican | Larry Ulrich | 10,255 | 30.9 |
| 154 | Democratic | Napoleon Nelson | Re-elected | Democratic | Napoleon Nelson | 26,418 | 79.9 |
| 154 | Democratic | Napoleon Nelson | Re-elected | Republican | Angelina Banks | 6,312 | 19.1 |
| 155 | Democratic | Danielle Friel Otten | Re-elected | Democratic | Danielle Friel Otten | 18,604 | 56.0 |
| 155 | Democratic | Danielle Friel Otten | Re-elected | Republican | Kyle Scribner | 14,130 | 42.6 |
| 156 | Democratic | Dianne Herrin | Retired | Democratic | Chris Pielli | 18,510 | 59.0 |
| 156 | Democratic | Dianne Herrin | Retired | Republican | Heidi VanderWaal | 12,537 | 40.0 |
| 157 | Democratic | Melissa Shusterman | Re-elected | Democratic | Melissa Shusterman | 21,326 | 60.8 |
| 157 | Democratic | Melissa Shusterman | Re-elected | Republican | Sarah Marvin | 13,363 | 38.1 |
| 158 | Democratic | Christina Sappey | Re-elected | Democratic | Christina Sappey | 17,207 | 55.1 |
| 158 | Democratic | Christina Sappey | Re-elected | Republican | Leon Spencer | 13,716 | 43.9 |
| 159 | Democratic | Brian Joseph Kirkland | Lost primary | Democratic | Carol Kazeem | 11,852 | 65.1 |
| 159 | Democratic | Brian Joseph Kirkland | Lost primary | Republican | Ruth Moton | 6,172 | 33.9 |
| 160 | Republican | Craig Williams | Re-elected | Republican | Craig Williams | 18,353 | 51.8 |
| 160 | Republican | Craig Williams | Re-elected | Democratic | Catherine Spahr | 16,698 | 47.2 |
| 161 | Democratic | Leanne Krueger | Re-elected | Democratic | Leanne Krueger | 18,122 | 59.0 |
| 161 | Democratic | Leanne Krueger | Re-elected | Republican | Edward Mongelluzzo | 12,296 | 40.0 |
| 162 | Democratic | David Delloso | Re-elected | Democratic | David Delloso | 15,145 | 58.2 |
| 162 | Democratic | David Delloso | Re-elected | Republican | Michelle Mattus | 10,625 | 40.8 |
| 163 | Democratic | Michael Zabel | Re-elected | Democratic | Michael Zabel | 16,448 | 64.4 |
| 163 | Democratic | Michael Zabel | Re-elected | Republican | Kenneth P. Rucci | 8,450 | 33.1 |
| 163 | Democratic | Michael Zabel | Re-elected | Libertarian | Alfe Goodwin | 399 | 1.6 |
| 164 | Democratic | Gina Curry | Re-elected | Democratic | Gina Curry | 15,366 | 100 |
| 165 | Democratic | Jennifer O'Mara | Re-elected | Democratic | Jennifer O'Mara | 21,145 | 60.5 |
| 165 | Democratic | Jennifer O'Mara | Re-elected | Republican | Nichole Missino | 13,056 | 37.4 |
| 166 | Democratic | Greg Vitali | Re-elected | Democratic | Greg Vitali | 22,941 | 64.8 |
| 166 | Democratic | Greg Vitali | Re-elected | Republican | Kimberly Razzano | 11,758 | 33.2 |
| 166 | Democratic | Greg Vitali | Re-elected | Libertarian | Edward T. Clifford III | 350 | 1.0 |
| 167 | Democratic | Kristine Howard | Re-elected | Democratic | Kristine Howard | 19,276 | 59.4 |
| 167 | Democratic | Kristine Howard | Re-elected | Republican | Gail Newman | 12,867 | 39.6 |
| 168 | Republican | Christopher B. Quinn | Defeated | Democratic | Lisa Borowski | 17,485 | 55.5 |
| 168 | Republican | Christopher B. Quinn | Defeated | Republican | Christopher B. Quinn | 13,708 | 43.5 |
| 169 | Republican | Kate Klunk | Re-elected | Republican | Kate Klunk | 19,638 | 69.9 |
| 169 | Republican | Kate Klunk | Re-elected | Democratic | Isaac Riston | 7,635 | 27.2 |
| 170 | Republican | Martina White | Re-elected | Republican | Martina White | 13,531 | 100 |
| 171 | Republican | Kerry Benninghoff | Re-elected | Republican | Kerry Benninghoff | 19,028 | 71.2 |
| 171 | Republican | Kerry Benninghoff | Re-elected | Democratic | Robert Zeigler | 7,415 | 27.8 |
| 172 | Democratic | Kevin J. Boyle | Re-elected | Democratic | Kevin J. Boyle | 10,625 | 56.4 |
| 172 | Democratic | Kevin J. Boyle | Re-elected | Republican | Al Taubenberger | 8,023 | 42.6 |
| 173 | Democratic | Michael Driscoll | Ran for Philadelphia City Council | Democratic | Pat Gallagher | 9,548 | 100 |
| 174 | Democratic | Ed Neilson | Re-elected | Democratic | Ed Neilson | 11,294 | 100 |
| 175 | Democratic | Mary Isaacson | Re-elected | Democratic | Mary Isaacson | 23,904 | 100 |
| 176 | Republican | Jack Rader | Re-elected | Republican | Jack Rader | 14,036 | 56.7 |
| 176 | Republican | Jack Rader | Re-elected | Democratic | Hope Christman | 9,024 | 36.4 |
| 176 | Republican | Jack Rader | Re-elected | Libertarian | Autumn Pangia | 1,237 | 5.0 |
| 177 | Democratic | Joseph C. Hohenstein | Re-elected | Democratic | Joseph C. Hohenstein | 11,070 | 65.2 |
| 177 | Democratic | Joseph C. Hohenstein | Re-elected | Republican | Mark Lavelle | 5,751 | 33.8 |
| 178 | Republican | Wendi Thomas | Retired | Republican | Kristin Marcell | 20,075 | 56.0 |
| 178 | Republican | Wendi Thomas | Retired | Democratic | Ilya Breyman | 15,410 | 43.0 |
| 179 | Democratic | Jason Dawkins | Re-elected | Democratic | Jason Dawkins | 9,256 | 100 |
| 180 | Democratic | Angel Cruz | Retired | Democratic | Jose Giral | 6,584 | 100 |
| 181 | Democratic | Malcolm Kenyatta | Re-elected | Democratic | Malcolm Kenyatta | 15,426 | 100 |
| 182 | Democratic | Brian Sims | Ran for Lt. Governor | Democratic | Ben Waxman | 26,728 | 88.5 |
| 182 | Democratic | Brian Sims | Ran for Lt. Governor | Republican | Albert Robles | 3,161 | 10.5 |
| 183 | Republican | Zach Mako | Re-elected | Republican | Zach Mako | 21,729 | 100 |
| 184 | Democratic | Elizabeth Fiedler | Re-elected | Democratic | Elizabeth Fiedler | 15,758 | 74.1 |
| 184 | Democratic | Elizabeth Fiedler | Re-elected | Republican | Marjilyn Murray | 5,281 | 24.8 |
| 185 | Democratic | Regina Young | Re-elected | Democratic | Regina Young | 12,782 | 100 |
| 186 | Democratic | Jordan A. Harris | Re-elected | Democratic | Jordan A. Harris | 21,307 | 100 |
| 187 | Republican | Gary Day | Lost Primary | Republican | Ryan Mackenzie | | |
| 188 | Democratic | Rick Krajewski | Re-elected | Democratic | Rick Krajewski | 19,279 | 100 |
| 189 | Republican | Rosemary Brown | Ran for State Senate | Democratic | Tarah Probst | 11,341 | 55.1 |
| 189 | Republican | Rosemary Brown | Ran for State Senate | Republican | Stephen Ertle | 8,967 | 43.5 |
| 190 | Democratic | Amen Brown | Elected (Redistricted into the 10th district) | Democratic | G. Roni Green | 17,056 | 96.7 |
| 190 | Democratic | Amen Brown | Elected (Redistricted into the 10th district) | Independent | James Love Jackson | 583 | 3.3 |
| 191 | Democratic | Joanna E. McClinton | Re-elected | Democratic | Joanna E. McClinton | 10,775 | 100 |
| 192 | Democratic | Morgan Cephas | Re-elected | Democratic | Morgan Cephas | 19,438 | 100 |
| 193 | Republican | Torren Ecker | Re-elected | Republican | Torren Ecker | 20,936 | 100 |
| 194 | Democratic | Pamela DeLissio | Lost Primary | Democratic | Tarik Khan | 23,159 | 90.2 |
| 194 | Democratic | Pamela DeLissio | Lost Primary | Libertarian | Torren Danowski | 2,246 | 8.8 |
| 195 | Democratic | Donna Bullock | Re-elected | Democratic | Donna Bullock | 19,697 | 100 |
| 196 | Republican | Seth Grove | Re-elected | Republican | Seth Grove | 22,675 | 100 |
| 197 | Democratic | Danilo Burgos | Re-elected | Democratic | Danilo Burgos | 10,835 | 100 |
| 198 | Democratic | Darisha Parker | Re-elected | Democratic | Darisha Parker | 17,078 | 100 |
| 199 | Republican | Barbara Gleim | Re-elected | Republican | Barbara Gleim | 16,230 | 60.8 |
| 199 | Republican | Barbara Gleim | Re-elected | Democratic | Alan Howe | 10,181 | 38.2 |
| 200 | Democratic | Chris Rabb | Re-elected | Democratic | Chris Rabb | 29,663 | 95.1 |
| 200 | Democratic | Chris Rabb | Re-elected | Republican | Kionna West | 1,216 | 3.9 |
| 201 | Democratic | Stephen Kinsey | Re-elected | Democratic | Stephen Kinsey | 20,235 | 100 |
| 202 | Democratic | Jared Solomon | Re-elected | Democratic | Jared Solomon | 7,490 | 100 |
| 203 | Democratic | Isabella Fitzgerald | Lost Primary (Redistricted into the 200th district) | Democratic | Anthony A. Bellmon | 12,300 | 100 |

Source: Pennsylvania Department of State

== Aftermath ==
For months after the election, partisan control of the chamber was claimed by both parties, with three vacancies due to Democrats not being able to take their seats due to death or resignation. After protracted bipartisan negotiations, 16 Republicans joined all Democrats in voting for Mark Rozzi as Speaker, who subsequently announced that he would become an independent and no longer caucus with the Democrats. However, a special session to set operating rules in the House on November 9 was postponed indefinitely, and Jim Gregory, who nominated Rozzi as Speaker, called for him to resign, claiming that he had broken his promise to switch his party registration to independent. Rozzi never left the Democratic caucus, instead resigning the speakership after passing an amendment to provide relief for victims of childhood sexual abuse in the Roman Catholic Church. Joanna McClinton would be elected speaker in a party-line vote following special elections to fill the vacant seats in February 2023.

== See also ==
- 2022 Pennsylvania elections
- Elections in Pennsylvania
- List of Pennsylvania state legislatures
