= Joseph Petrarca =

Joseph Petrarca may refer to:

- Joseph Petrarca Sr., member of the Pennsylvania House of Representatives, 1973–1994
- Joseph Petrarca Jr., his son, member of the Pennsylvania House of Representatives, 1995–2020
