= Petrarca (disambiguation) =

Petrarch or Francesco Petrarca (1304-1374) was an Italian scholar, poet, and Renaissance humanist.

Petrarca may also refer to:

- 12722 Petrarca, a minor planet
- Petrarca Rugby, an Italian rugby union club
- A.S. Petrarca Calcio, an Italian football club

== People with the surname ==
- David Petrarca (born 1965), American director and producer
- Lorenzo Petrarca (born 1997), Italian motorcycle racer
- Joseph Petrarca Jr. (born 1961), American politician
- Joseph Petrarca Sr. (1928–1995), American politician
- Frank J. Petrarca (1918-1943), U.S. soldier and recipient of the Medal of Honor
