= Jill Cooper =

Jill Cooper may refer to:

- Jill Cooper (tennis) (born 1949), British tennis player
- Jill Cooper (politician) (born c. 1962), American politician

== See also ==
- Jilly Cooper (1937–2025), English author
- Jillie Cooper (born 1988), Scootish badminton player
