= Lawrence Roberts (politician) =

American politician

Member of the Pennsylvania House of Representatives from the 51st district
- In office January 5, 1993 – November 30, 2006
- Preceded by: Fred Taylor
- Succeeded by: Timothy S. Mahoney

Personal details
- Born: November 18, 1941 (age 84) Uniontown, Pennsylvania, United States
- Party: Democratic
- Spouse: Nataliya
- Occupation: Legislator-Arbitrator/Mediator

Lawrence "Larry" Roberts is a former Democratic member of the Pennsylvania House of Representatives.

Roberts attended Uniontown High School, graduating in 1959. He attended the Community College of the Air Force and Bowie State College before earning a master's at Central Michigan University in 1981.

Roberts was first elected to represent the 51st legislative district in 1992. The Herald-Standard newspaper sued in 2000 to gain access to Roberts's cellular and long-distance phone records, citing the fact that the calls were paid for with state money. The suit was dismissed, but in 2003 the Pennsylvania Supreme Court ordered the Commonwealth Court of Pennsylvania to reconsider whether a Herald-Standard reporter's civil rights were violated when Roberts showed the sought-after phone records to another reporter, but not to the original reporter. The full case was dismissed in 2006.

He retired prior to the 2006 election. Activists had targeted him because of his support for the controversial 2005 legislative pay raise Roberts accepted the optional "unvouchered expense account" money, which were used by the legislature to "skirt a [constitutional] prohibition on midterm raises."
