= Gust Stemmler =

American politician

Gust L. Stemmler

Member of the Pennsylvania House of Representatives from the 55th district
- In office 1969–1972
- Preceded by: District created
- Succeeded by: Joseph Petrarca, Sr.

Member of the Pennsylvania House of Representatives from the Westmoreland County district
- In office 1963–1968

Personal details
- Born: December 10, 1899
- Died: November 7, 1986 (aged 86)
- Party: Democratic

Gust L. Stemmler (December 10, 1899 – November 7, 1986) is a former Democratic member of the Pennsylvania House of Representatives. He served as a representative from 1963 to 1972.
