= John Wansacz =

American politician and businessman

Member of the Pennsylvania House of Representatives from the 114th district
- In office January 7, 1969 – November 30, 1972
- Preceded by: District Created
- Succeeded by: Jonathan Vipond
- In office January 7, 1975 – November 30, 1978
- Preceded by: Jonathan Vipond
- Succeeded by: Frank Serafini

Member of the Pennsylvania House of Representatives from the Lackawanna County district
- In office January 5, 1965 – November 30, 1968

Personal details
- Born: October 7, 1936 Old Forge, Lackawanna County, Pennsylvania
- Died: November 15, 2014 (aged 78) Danville, Pennsylvania
- Party: Democratic
- Spouse: Maryann Presty

John Wansacz (October 7, 1936 – November 15, 2014) was an American politician and businessman.

== Political career ==
Wansacz served as a Democratic member of the Pennsylvania House of Representatives from 1965 to 1972 and 1975 to 1978.

== Background ==
Born in Old Forge, Pennsylvania, Wansacz graduated from Old Forge High School. He then worked at Morris White Fashions. He owned Heart Lake Lodge and was on the Lackawanna County, Pennsylvania Board of Appeals.
