= Frank Serafini =

American politician

Frank A. Serafini

Member of the Pennsylvania House of Representatives from the 114th district
- In office January 2, 1979 – February 7, 2000
- Preceded by: John Wansacz
- Succeeded by: James Wansacz

Personal details
- Born: February 15, 1945 (age 81) Taylor, Pennsylvania
- Party: Republican
- Spouse: Stasia Warren

Frank A. Serafini (born February 15, 1945) is a former Republican member of the Pennsylvania House of Representatives. He was sworn in to represent the 114th legislative district in the Pennsylvania House of Representatives in 1979.

== Biography ==
In 1999, Serafini was convicted of federal perjury charges for lying in his federal grand jury testimony regarding a scheme involving his nephew to funnel $129,000 in illegal campaign contributions to 10 political candidates.

After his conviction, he delayed resigning his seat, as was required by the Pennsylvania Constitution, in order to extend a 103-100 Republican majority in the House. He eventually resigned his seat on February 7, 2000.
