= Pat Trusio =

American politician

Pat C. Trusio

Member of the Pennsylvania House of Representatives from the 51st district
- In office 1973–1974
- Preceded by: Fred Taylor
- Succeeded by: Fred Taylor

Personal details
- Born: January 3, 1916 Oliver, Pennsylvania
- Died: November 19, 2001 (aged 85) Uniontown, Pennsylvania
- Party: Democratic

Pat C. Trusio (January 3, 1916 – November 19, 2001) is a former Democratic member of the Pennsylvania House of Representatives.
