= Peter Daley =

American politician (1950–2022)

Peter John Daley, II

Member of the Pennsylvania House of Representatives from the 49th district
- In office 1983–2016
- Preceded by: A. J. DeMedico
- Succeeded by: Bud Cook

Personal details
- Born: August 8, 1950 Brownsville, Pennsylvania, U.S.
- Died: June 1, 2022 (aged 71) California, Pennsylvania, U.S.
- Party: Democratic
- Education: California University of Pennsylvania (B.A.); California University of Pennsylvania (M.A.); University of Pittsburgh (M.P.A.); Widener University Delaware Law School (J.D.)
- Alma mater: California Area School District
- Occupation: Attorney

Peter John Daley, II (August 8, 1950 – June 1, 2022) was an American politician who was a Democratic member of the Pennsylvania House of Representatives, representing the 49th Legislative District until 2016. Daley decided to retire and not seek an 18th term in 2016. His district included portions of Fayette County and Washington County.

== Biography ==
Daley was born in Brownsville, Pennsylvania, and graduated from California Area High School in 1968. He earned a Bachelor of Science degree in social studies from California University of Pennsylvania in 1972, and then taught at California Area High School for seven years. He was a delegate to the 1972 Democratic National Convention and served as chair of the Washington Young Democrats (1972–75).

In 1973, at age 22, Daley was elected mayor of California Borough. He served in that position until he was elected to the Pennsylvania House of Representatives in 1982.

From 2009 to 2011, Daley served as the Pennsylvania House of Representatives Commerce Committee Democratic Chairperson. In 2009-10, he also served on the Game & Fisheries Committee and the Intergovernmental Affairs Committee.

Daley served as the Democratic Chair of the Pennsylvania House of Representatives Consumer Affairs Committee in 2013 to 2016.

Daley announced that he would retire from his position on January 7, 2016.

Daley died on June 1, 2022, in California, Pennsylvania. An announcement by Pennsylvania Governor Tom Wolf was made on June 2, 2022, that all flags on Commonwealth facilities, public buildings, and grounds fly at half-staff immediately.
