= Jonathan Vipond =

American politician

Member of the Pennsylvania House of Representatives from the 114th district
- In office 1973–1974
- Preceded by: John Wansacz
- Succeeded by: John Wansacz

Personal details
- Born: January 9, 1945 (age 81) Scranton, Pennsylvania
- Party: Republican
- Education: Williams College

Jonathan Vipond III (born January 9, 1945) is a former Republican member of the Pennsylvania House of Representatives.
