= Matt Dowling (politician) =

American politician

Member of the Pennsylvania House of Representatives from the 51st district
- In office January 3, 2017 – November 30, 2022
- Preceded by: Timothy S. Mahoney
- Succeeded by: Charity Grimm Krupa

Personal details
- Born: November 18, 1984 (age 41) Uniontown, Pennsylvania, U.S.
- Party: Republican (2014–present)
- Spouse: Rebecca Harmon-Dowling (2010-2024)
- Children: 2
- Education: Waynesburg University
- Website: http://www.MatthewDDowling.com

Matt Dowling (born November 18, 1984) is an American politician who served in the Pennsylvania House of Representatives for the 51st district from 2017 to 2022, as a member of the Republican Party.

== Early life ==
Dowling graduated from Uniontown Area High School in 2003. He studied Theology and Philosophy at Franciscan University of Steubenville and obtained a B.A. in Business Administration and Management from Waynesburg University.

== Political career ==
Dowling began his political career in 2016, when he defeated Tim Mahoney, a five-term Democratic incumbent, in the general election for the 51st District seat in the Pennsylvania House of Representatives.

The 51st Legislative District consisted of portions of Fayette and Somerset counties. In the state House, Dowling was assigned to the Judiciary, Liquor Control, State Government, and Urban Affairs committees.

=== 2020 presidential election ===
In 2020, incumbent President Donald Trump lost Pennsylvania and was defeated in his bid for reelection. Trump and his allies refused to accept his defeat, falsely claimed that the election was fraudulent or marred by irregularities, and carried out a months-long effort to overturn the election result. Dowling was one of many Republican members of the Pennsylvania Legislature who signed a January 4, 2021 letter to Pennsylvania's congressional delegation asking them to seek a halt to the 2021 United States Electoral College vote count (and thus the formalization of the victory of Joe Biden). The letter was sent prior to the January 6 United States Capitol attack, in which a pro-Trump mob stormed the Capitol in a bid to halt the counting of the votes and keep Trump in power.

=== Second Amendment Caucus Chairmanship ===
Matthew Dowling was named chairman of the House Second Amendment Caucus for the 2021-22 Legislative Session. Upon Dowling's retirement Rep. Abby Major (R-Armstrong/Indiana/Butler) was named chair.

=== Drunk driving and retirement ===
On July 1, 2022, three weeks after an automobile crash involving the consumption of alcohol, Dowling ended his bid for reelection, removing his name from the ballot. On September 19, 2022, the Editorial Board of the Pittsburgh Post-Gazette printed a favorable editorial about Dowling's proposed bill to allow self-exclusion from alcohol purchases.

== Personal life ==
In June 2022, Dowling was charged with driving under the influence of alcohol, careless driving, driving an unregistered vehicle, and following too closely. The charges followed his arrest in South Union Township after he rear-ended another vehicle twice at a red light at a busy intersection. Dowling's blood alcohol content was .272, over three times the legal limit in Pennsylvania. The crash took place the day after Dowling's driver's license had been reinstated; his license had previously been medically suspended after an October 2021 automobile crash, which was due to a diabetic emergency. Dowling said he would enter treatment to "address any possible alcohol issues" and attributed the crash to "disappointing behavior that I have faced in the past with respect to alcohol."

In December 2023, Dowling was charged with several misdemeanors. In the midst of divorcing his wife, Dowling was alleged to have filed false reports of child abuse against his wife. The charge was later dropped. Dowling was listed in The Herald-Standard as having been charged with crimes that did not result in conviction. The newspaper printed a correction.

== Electoral history ==
=== 2016 ===
2016 Pennsylvania House of Representatives, District 51 election
Party	Candidate	Votes	%
Republican	Matt Dowling	13,318	53.07%
Democratic	Tim Mahoney (incumbent)	11,779	46.93%
Total votes		25,097	100.00%

=== 2018 ===
2018 Pennsylvania House of Representatives, District 51 election
Party	Candidate	Votes	%
Republican	Matt Dowling (incumbent)	10,773	55.47%
Democratic	Tim Mahoney	8,650	44.53%
Total votes		19,423	100.00%

=== 2020 ===
2020 Pennsylvania House of Representatives, District 51 election
Party	Candidate	Votes	%
Republican	Matt Dowling (incumbent)	19,592	68.64%
Democratic	Kevin Jones	8,953	31.36%
Total votes		28,545	100.00%

=== 2022 ===
2022 Pennsylvania House of Representatives, District 51 Republican primary
Party	Candidate	Votes	%
Republican	Matt Dowling (incumbent)	3,642	60.20%
Republican	Ryan Porupski	2,408	39.80%
Total votes		6,050	100.00%
