= Pennsylvania House of Representatives, District 114 =

American legislative district

Pennsylvania's 114th State House of Representatives district
Representative
Bridget Malloy Kosierowski; D–Scranton
- Population (2022): 62,413

The 114th Pennsylvania House of Representatives District is located in northeast Pennsylvania and has been represented by Democrat Bridget Malloy Kosierowski since 2019.

== District profile ==
The 114th Pennsylvania House of Representatives District is located entirely in Lackawanna County, including the following areas:

- Benton Township
- Clarks Green
- Clarks Summit
- Dickson City
- Greenfield Township
- North Abington Township
- Scott Township
- Scranton (PART)
  - Ward 01, 02, 03, 07, 13, 21, 23
  - Ward 04 (PART)
    - Division 02
- South Abington Township
- Waverly Township

== Representatives ==
Representative	Party	Years	District home	Note
Prior to 1969, seats were apportioned by county.
John Wansacz	Democrat	1969 – 1972		
Jonathan Vipond	Republican	1973 – 1974		
John Wansacz	Democrat	1975 – 1978		
Frank A. Serafini	Republican	1979 – 2000		Resigned on February 7, 2000
James Wansacz	Democrat	2000 – 2010	Old Forge	Elected fill vacancy on June 20, 2000
Sid Michaels Kavulich	Democrat	2011 – 2018	Taylor	Representative Kavulich died in office on October 16, 2018.
Bridget Kosierowski	Democrat	2019 – present		Elected in special election to fill vacancy

== Recent election results ==
PA House election, 2022: Pennsylvania House, District 114
Party	Candidate	Votes	%
Democratic	Bridget Malloy Kosierowski (incumbent)	16,745	62.53
Republican	David Burgerhoff	10,036	37.47
Total votes		26,781	100.00
Democratic hold			

PA House election, 2020: Pennsylvania House, District 114
Party	Candidate	Votes	%
Democratic	Bridget Malloy Kosierowski (incumbent)	19,890	53.87
Republican	James May	17,030	46.13
Total votes		36,920	100.00
Democratic hold			

PA House special election, 2019: Pennsylvania House, District 114
Party	Candidate	Votes	%
Democratic	Bridget Malloy Kosierowski	6,718	62.45
Republican	Frank Scavo	4,040	37.55
Total votes		10,758	100.00
Democratic hold			

PA House election, 2018: Pennsylvania House, District 114
Party	Candidate	Votes	%
Democratic	Sid Michaels Kavulich (incumbent)	Unopposed	
Total votes		15,787	100.00
Democratic hold			

PA House election, 2016: Pennsylvania House, District 114
Party	Candidate	Votes	%
Democratic	Sid Michaels Kavulich (incumbent)	21,450	67.15
Republican	Cheryl Scandale-Murnin	10,495	32.85
Total votes		31,945	100.00
Democratic hold			

PA House election, 2014: Pennsylvania House, District 114
Party	Candidate	Votes	%
Democratic	Sid Michaels Kavulich (incumbent)	12,981	66.95
Republican	Melanie Madeira	6,407	33.05
Total votes		19,388	100.00
Democratic hold			

PA House election, 2012: Pennsylvania House, District 114
Party	Candidate	Votes	%
Democratic	Sid Michaels Kavulich (incumbent)	Unopposed	
Total votes		24,661	100.00
Democratic hold			
