= Thomas Caltagirone =

American politician

Thomas R. Caltagirone

Member of the Pennsylvania House of Representatives from the 127th district
- In office January 5, 1977 – November 30, 2020
- Preceded by: Russell LaMarca
- Succeeded by: Manny Guzman Jr.

Personal details
- Born: October 30, 1942 (age 83) Reading, Pennsylvania, U.S.
- Party: Democratic
- Education: Reading Senior High School; Frederick College; Temple University
- Occupation: Social Worker; Teacher; Community Organizer
- Website: http://www.pahouse.com/caltagirone/

Thomas R. "Tom" Caltagirone (born October 30, 1942) is a former Democratic member of the Pennsylvania House of Representatives. He represented the 127th District (Reading, Berks County) and was the chairman of the House Judiciary Committee and a member of the Gaming Oversight Committee.

== Background ==
Caltagirone was born in Reading, Pennsylvania on October 30, 1942. Prior to Representing the 127th District, Caltagirone was employed in Reading in private business and as a social worker and teacher for the Reading School District. In addition, he has been a member of numerous local charitable and social organizations.

Caltagirone has been the prime sponsor of 32 bills that have been signed into law by the governor. On January 27, 2019, he announced that he had been appointed as the new Democratic chairman of the House Urban Affairs Committee for the 2019–2020 legislative session, and would be working on affordable housing legislation.

Caltagirone refused to support the Democratic nominee, H. William DeWeese for Speaker of the House in 2007, resulting in a member from the minority party serving as Speaker, Dennis M. O'Brien, a Republican from Philadelphia. DeWeese later went to prison for several years for public corruption and O'Brien went on to serve on Philadelphia City Council.

In December 2017 it was revealed that Pennsylvania House Democrats spent nearly a quarter-million dollars in taxpayer money to secretly settle a sexual harassment complaint against Caltagirone. The $248,000 payment of taxpayer's money went to settle a complaint in 2015 against Caltagirone by a legislative staffer who worked for about a decade in his Reading office. A document prepared by the state's Bureau of Risk and Insurance Management that said House Democrats authorized paying $165,500 to the unidentified woman and $82,500 to her lawyer. A "sovereign immunity-tort claims settlement memorandum and invoice" asserted Caltagirone's staffer had initially made a claim of $1.5 million for what was called "a complaint of discrimination, among other things" under a federal law that bans discrimination based on sex, race, color, national origin and religion. Caltagirone said in a written statement the day after the news report that he was prohibited from discussing specifics of any employment-related settlement, but added that from the start he has denied all accusations. The details of the allegations against Caltagirone have not been made public. Governor Tom Wolf and legislative leaders called for Caltagirone's resignation, but he refused to resign.

During his 2018 campaign for reelection, Caltagirone defeated his primary opponent, community activist Manny Guzman Jr., by only 10 percent. He went on to defeat his Republican general election opponent by a margin of 81 to 19 percent.

In January 2020, Caltagirone announced that he would retire after finishing his 22nd term in office, which he claimed made him the state's longest-serving representative. He served alongside 14 Speakers of the House and nine governors.

== Notable committee leadership service ==
Chairman of the House Consumer Affairs Committee – 2016 – 2018

Chairman of the House Urban Affairs Committee – 2014 – 2016

Chairman of the House Judiciary Committee – 1989 – 1998, 2005 – 2014

Chairman of the House Commerce Committee – 1998 – 2005

Chairman of the House Consumer Affairs Committee – 1988 – 1989
