= Pennsylvania House of Representatives, District 55 =

American legislative district

Pennsylvania's 55th State House of Representatives district
Representative
Jill N. Cooper; R–Murrysville
- Population (2022): 66,435

The 55th Pennsylvania House of Representatives district is located in southwest Pennsylvania and has been represented by Jill N. Cooper since 2023.

== District profile ==
The 55th district is located in Westmoreland County and includes the following areas:

- Arnold
- Avonmore
- Bell Township
- Delmont
- Derry Township (part)
  - District Alters
  - District Simpsons
- Export
- Lower Burrell (part)
  - Ward 04 (part)
    - Division 01
- Loyalhanna Township
- Murrysville
- New Alexandria
- New Kensington
- Oklahoma
- Salem Township
- Upper Burrell Township
- Washington Township

== Representatives ==
Representative	Party	Years	District home	Note
Prior to 1969, seats were apportioned by county.
Gust L. Stemmler	Democrat	1969 – 1972		
Joseph A. Petrarca, Sr.	Democrat	1973 – 1994		
Joseph A. Petrarca, Jr.	Democrat	1995 - 2021	Vandergrift	
Jason Silvis	Republican	2021 - 2023		
Jill N. Cooper	Republican	2023–present		Incumbent

== Recent election results ==
PA House election, 2024: Pennsylvania House, District 55
Party	Candidate	Votes	%
Republican	Jill Cooper (incumbent)	26,389	67.80
Democratic	Davon Magwood	12,535	32.20
Total votes		38,924	100.00
Republican hold			

PA House election, 2022: Pennsylvania House, District 55
Party	Candidate	Votes	%
Republican	Jill Cooper	18,523	61.52
Democratic	Scott Gauss	11,585	38.48
Total votes		30,108	100.00
Republican hold			

PA House election, 2020: Pennsylvania House, District 55
Party	Candidate	Votes	%
Republican	Jason Silvis	16,336	52.28
Democratic	Joseph Petrarca, Jr. (incumbent)	14,914	47.72
Total votes		31,250	100.00
Republican gain from Democratic			

PA House election, 2018: Pennsylvania House, District 55
Party	Candidate	Votes	%
Democratic	Joseph Petrarca, Jr. (incumbent)	Unopposed	
Total votes		14,579	100.00
Democratic hold			

PA House election, 2016: Pennsylvania House, District 55
Party	Candidate	Votes	%
Democratic	Joseph Petrarca, Jr. (incumbent)	15,554	56.39
Republican	Michael Geiselhart	12,028	43.61
Total votes		27,582	100.00
Democratic hold			
