= James Wansacz =

American politician

Member of the Lackawanna County Board of Commissioners
- In office January 2, 2012 – January 2, 2016 Serving with Corey O'Brien and Patrick O'Malley
- Preceded by: Mike Washo
- Succeeded by: Jerry Notarianni

Member of the Pennsylvania House of Representatives from the 114th district
- In office June 26, 2000 – November 30, 2010
- Preceded by: Frank Serafini
- Succeeded by: Sid Michaels Kavulich

Personal details
- Born: June 8, 1972 (age 54) Scranton, Pennsylvania
- Party: Democratic
- Education: Indiana University of Pennsylvania

James Wansacz (born June 8, 1972) is an American politician and member of the Democratic Party. He was a member of the Pennsylvania House of Representatives from 2000 through 2010. He was first elected in a special election held on June 20, 2000 and served until his retirement in 2010 after an unsuccessful run for the State Senate. In 2011, Wansacz was elected to serve on the Lackawanna County Board of Commissioners. In the 2015 Democratic primary, he was defeated for renomination by former Democratic chairman Jerry Notarianni and Republican-turned-Democrat Patrick O'Malley.
