= Fred Taylor (Pennsylvania politician) =

American politician (1931–2015)

Member of the Pennsylvania House of Representatives from the 51st district
- In office 1975–1992
- Preceded by: Pat C. Trusio
- Succeeded by: Lawrence Roberts

Member of the Pennsylvania House of Representatives from the 51st district
- In office 1969–1972
- Preceded by: District created
- Succeeded by: Pat C. Trusio

Member of the Pennsylvania House of Representatives from the Fayette County district
- In office 1967–1968

Personal details
- Born: August 30, 1931 Adah, Pennsylvania
- Died: September 19, 2015 (aged 84)
- Party: Democratic

Fred E. Taylor (August 30, 1931 – September 19, 2015) was an American politician who was a Democratic member of the Pennsylvania House of Representatives. Taylor died on September 19, 2015, at the age of 84.
