= Sid Michaels Kavulich =

American politician (1956–2018)

Member of the Pennsylvania House of Representatives from the 114th district
- In office January 4, 2011 – October 16, 2018
- Preceded by: James Wansacz
- Succeeded by: Bridget Kosierowski

Personal details
- Born: August 22, 1956 Taylor, Pennsylvania, U.S.
- Died: October 16, 2018 (aged 62) Philadelphia, Pennsylvania, U.S.
- Party: Democratic
- Spouse: Linda Vass
- Children: 3
- Education: Williamsport Area Community College
- Occupation: Radio and television broadcaster
- Website: Official Website

Michael G. Kavulich (August 22, 1956 – October 16, 2018), known as Sid Michaels Kavulich, was an American politician, radio, and television broadcaster.

== Biography ==
Kavulich was born in Taylor, Pennsylvania and graduated from Riverside Jr/Sr High School in 1974. In 1976, he received his associate arts degree in broadcasting from Williamsport Area Community College. Kavulich was a radio and television broadcaster.

== Political career ==
He was a Democratic member of the Pennsylvania House of Representatives. He was first elected in 2010, and was sworn in on January 4, 2011. He served on the Aging & Older Adult Services, Agriculture and Rural Affairs, Commerce, and the Finance Committees.

== Death ==
Kavulich died on October 16, 2018, at the University of Pennsylvania, in Philadelphia, Pennsylvania, following complications from heart surgery. He was reelected unopposed on November 6, 2018, having died too late into the race for his name to be removed or replaced with another candidate.
