= Pennsylvania House of Representatives, District 51 =

American legislative district

Pennsylvania's 51st State House of Representatives district
Representative
Charity Grimm Krupa; R–Smithfield
- Population (2022): 65,033

The 51st Pennsylvania House of Representatives District is located in southern Pennsylvania and has been represented by Charity Grimm Krupa since 2023.

== District profile ==
The 51st Pennsylvania House of Representatives District is located in Fayette County and includes the following areas:

- Fairchance
- Georges Township
- German Township
- Henry Clay Township
- Markleysburg
- Masontown
- Menallen Township
- Nicholson Township
- North Union Township
- Point Marion
- Smithfield
- South Union Township
- Springhill Township
- Uniontown
- Wharton Township

== Representatives ==
Representative	Party	Years	District home	Note
Prior to 1969, seats were apportioned by county.
Fred Taylor	Democrat	1969 – 1972		
Pat C. Trusio	Democrat	1973 – 1974		
Fred Taylor	Democrat	1975 – 1992		
Lawrence Roberts	Democrat	1992 – 2006		
Timothy S. Mahoney	Democrat	2007 – 2016	Uniontown	
Matt Dowling	Republican	2017 – 2023		
Charity Grimm Krupa	Republican	2023 – present		

== Recent election results ==
PA House election, 2024: Pennsylvania House, District 51
Party	Candidate	Votes	%
Republican	Charity Grimm Krupa (incumbent)	19,945	65.67
Democratic	George Huck Rattay	10,425	34.33
Total votes		30,370	100.00
Republican hold			

PA House election, 2022: Pennsylvania House, District 51
Party	Candidate	Votes	%
Republican	Charity Grimm Krupa	13,383	61.81
Democratic	Richard Ringer	8,269	38.19
Total votes		21,652	100.00
Republican hold			

PA House election, 2020: Pennsylvania House, District 51
Party	Candidate	Votes	%
Republican	Matt Dowling (incumbent)	19,592	68.64
Democratic	Kevin Jones	8,953	31.36
Total votes		28,545	100.00
Republican hold			

PA House election, 2018: Pennsylvania House, District 51
Party	Candidate	Votes	%
Republican	Matt Dowling (incumbent)	10,773	55.47
Democratic	Timothy Mahoney	8,650	44.53
Total votes		19,423	100.00
Republican hold			

PA House election, 2016: Pennsylvania House, District 51
Party	Candidate	Votes	%
Republican	Matt Dowling	13,318	53.07
Democratic	Timothy Mahoney (incumbent)	11,779	46.93
Total votes		25,097	100.00
Republican gain from Democratic			
