= Bud Cook (politician) =

American politician (born 1956)

Donald "Bud" Cook

Member of the Pennsylvania House of Representatives
- Incumbent
- Assumed office January 3, 2017
- Preceded by: Peter Daley
- Succeeded by: Ismail Smith-Wade-El
- Constituency: 49th District (2017–2022)
- Preceded by: Pam Snyder
- Constituency: 50th District (2023–present)

Personal details
- Born: June 29, 1956 (age 70)
- Party: Republican
- Education: West Virginia Wesleyan College (B.S.)
- Alma mater: California Area High School
- Website: repbudcook.com

Donald "Bud" Cook (born June 29, 1956) is a Republican member of the Pennsylvania House of Representatives, who has represented the 50th District since 2023. Prior to redistricting, Cook represented the 49th District from 2017 to 2022.

== Biography ==
Cook was born on June 29, 1956. He graduated from California Area High School. After earning a Bachelor of Science degree from West Virginia Wesleyan College, Cook served two terms from 1986 to 1989 as a councilman in Buckhannon, West Virginia.

=== Pennsylvania House of Representatives ===
In 2014, Cook unsuccessfully sought election to the Pennsylvania House of Representatives, losing to Democratic incumbent Peter Daley in the 49th District race. In 2016, Daley chose not to run for re-election. Cook once again ran for the 49th District seat and won. He won re-election in 2018 and 2020. Following redistricting, Cook ran for the 50th District seat in 2022, and won. Cook won his reelection in the 2024 Pennsylvania House of Representatives election, defeating Democratic challenger Drew Ross Manko. He was defeated in the Republican primary election by Benjamin Humble in 2026.

Cook's legislative priorities include lower taxes and gun rights. In 2020, he was among 26 State House Republicans who called for the reversal of Joe Biden's certification as the winner of Pennsylvania's electoral votes in the 2020 United States presidential election, citing false claims of election irregularities. He also was involved in a multi-year investigation of Local Share Accounts (LSA) and their use in Washington County.

== Electoral history ==
2014 Pennsylvania House of Representatives election, 49th District
Party	Candidate	Votes	%
Democratic	Peter Daley (incumbent)	8,557	56.4
Republican	Bud Cook	6,608	43.6
Total votes		15,165	100.00

2016 Pennsylvania House of Representatives Republican primary election, 49th District
Party	Candidate	Votes	%
Republican	Bud Cook	2,672	53.8
Republican	Melanie S. Patterson	2,257	46.2
Total votes		4,929	100.00

2016 Pennsylvania House of Representatives election, 49th District
Party	Candidate	Votes	%
Republican	Bud Cook	13,749	54.1
Democratic	Alan D. Benyak	11,667	45.9
Total votes		25,416	100.00

2018 Pennsylvania House of Representatives election, 49th District
Party	Candidate	Votes	%
Republican	Bud Cook (incumbent)	9,945	50.03
Democratic	Steven Toprani	9,934	49.97
Total votes		19,879	100.00

2020 Pennsylvania House of Representatives Republican primary election, 49th District
Party	Candidate	Votes	%
Republican	Bud Cook (incumbent)	3,353	60.9
Republican	Anthony James Bottino, Jr.	2,155	39.1
Total votes		5,508	100.00

2020 Pennsylvania House of Representatives election, 49th District
Party	Candidate	Votes	%
Republican	Bud Cook (incumbent)	17,926	63.6
Democratic	Randy J. Barli	10,278	36.4
Total votes		28,204	100.00

2022 Pennsylvania House of Representatives election, 50th District
Party	Candidate	Votes	%
Republican	Bud Cook	15,003	61.9
Democratic	Doug Mason	9,216	38.1
Total votes		24,219	100.00

2024 Pennsylvania House of Representatives Republican primary election, District 50
Party	Candidate	Votes	%
Republican	Bud Cook (incumbent)	3,920	62.05
Republican	Stephanie Waggett	2,367	37.47
Write-in		30	0.47
Total votes		6,317	100.00

2024 Pennsylvania House of Representatives election, 50th District
Party	Candidate	Votes	%
Republican	Bud Cook (incumbent)	20,318	69.18
Democratic	Drew Ross Manko	9,053	30.82
Total votes		29,371	100.00

Pennsylvania House of Representatives
Preceded by Peter Daley	Member of the Pennsylvania House of Representatives from the 49th district 2017–2023	Succeeded by Ismail Smith-Wade-El
Preceded by Pam Snyder	Member of the Pennsylvania House of Representatives from the 50th district 2023–present	Incumbent
