= Russell LaMarca =

American politician

Russell J. LaMarca

Member of the Pennsylvania House of Representatives from the 127th district
- In office January 7, 1969 – November 30, 1970
- Preceded by: District created
- Succeeded by: Thomas Caltagirone

Member of the Pennsylvania House of Representatives from the Berks County district
- In office 1965–1968

Personal details
- Born: December 17, 1928 Reading, Pennsylvania
- Died: October 7, 2001 (aged 72) West Reading, Pennsylvania
- Party: Democratic

Russell J. LaMarca (December 17, 1928 – October 7, 2001) was a Democratic member of the Pennsylvania House of Representatives.
