= Pennsylvania House of Representatives, District 49 =

American legislative district

Pennsylvania's 49th State House of Representatives district
Representative
Ismail Smith-Wade-El; D–Lancaster
- Population (2022): 62,983

The 49th Pennsylvania House of Representatives District in Lancaster, Pennsylvania has been represented by Ismail Smith-Wade-El since 2023.

== District profile ==
Following 2022 redistricting, the 49th District is located in Lancaster County and includes the following areas:

- Lancaster (part)
  - Ward 02 (part)
    - Division 02
  - Ward 03
  - Ward 04
  - Ward 06 (part)
    - Division 08
  - Ward 07
  - Ward 08
- Lancaster Township
- Millersville

== Representatives ==
Representative	Party	Years	District home	Note
Prior to 1969, seats were apportioned by county.
A. J. DeMedio	Democrat	1969 – 1982		
Peter J. Daley	Democrat	1983 – 2017	California	
Bud Cook	Republican	2017 – 2023	California	
District moved from Fayette and Washington Counties to Lancaster County in 2022 redistricting
Ismail Smith-Wade-El	Democrat	2023 – present	Lancaster	Incumbent

== Recent election results ==
PA House election, 2024: Pennsylvania House, District 49
Party	Candidate	Votes	%
Democratic	Izzy Smith-Wade-El (incumbent)	Unopposed	
Total votes		18,064	100.00
Democratic hold			

PA House election, 2022: Pennsylvania House, District 49
Party	Candidate	Votes	%
Democratic	Izzy Smith-Wade-El	11,045	66.71
Republican	Anne Rivers	5,511	33.29
Total votes		16,556	100.00
Democratic gain from Republican			

PA House election, 2020: Pennsylvania House, District 49
Party	Candidate	Votes	%
Republican	Bud Cook (incumbent)	17,926	63.56
Democratic	Randy Barli	10,278	36.44
Total votes		28,204	100.00
Republican hold			

PA House election, 2018: Pennsylvania House, District 49
Party	Candidate	Votes	%
Republican	Bud Cook (incumbent)	9,945	50.03
Democratic	Steven Toprani	9,934	49.97
Total votes		19,879	100.00
Republican hold			

PA House election, 2016: Pennsylvania House, District 49
Party	Candidate	Votes	%
Republican	Bud Cook	13,749	54.10
Democratic	Alan Benyak	11,667	45.90
Total votes		25,416	100.00
Republican gain from Democratic			
