= Timothy S. Mahoney =

American politician

Member of the Pennsylvania House of Representatives from the 51st district
- In office January 2, 2007 – November 8, 2016
- Preceded by: Larry Roberts
- Succeeded by: Matt Dowling

Personal details
- Party: Democratic
- Spouse: Beth
- Children: 4 children
- Website: http://www.vote4mahoney.com

Timothy S. "Tim" Mahoney is a Democratic member of the Pennsylvania House of Representatives for the 51st legislative district. He was elected in 2006.

== Biography ==
Prior to elective office, Mahoney worked as a coal miner and a member of the United Mine Workers. He also has owned many bar/taverns around the Fayette County area. He was elected jury commissioner for Fayette County, Pennsylvania in 2001. He was an independent candidate for the 51st legislative district in 2004, losing to incumbent democrat Larry Roberts.

Mahoney has served his community in many ways including an annual toy drive for needy children, college scholarships for local students, underage drinking seminars for teens, and a free annual dinner on Christmas Day for anyone who feels alone or lonely. Also, Mahoney has coached youth baseball and basketball teams, has been an active member in area booster clubs and has served on the Uniontown YMCA and Fayette County Airport Authority boards of directors.
