= A. J. DeMedio =

American politician

Member of the Pennsylvania House of Representatives from the 49th district
- In office 1969–1982
- Preceded by: District created
- Succeeded by: Peter Daley

Member of the Pennsylvania House of Representatives from the Washington County district
- In office 1967–1968

Personal details
- Born: March 25, 1916 Donora, Pennsylvania, United States
- Died: May 15, 1997 (aged 81) Donora, Pennsylvania, United States
- Party: Democratic

A. J. DeMedio (March 25, 1916 – May 15, 1997) was a Democratic member of the Pennsylvania House of Representatives and an attorney. He was elected in 1966 and served a total of 8 consecutive terms before retiring in 1982.

DeMedio was a World War II veteran, serving in the United States Army from 1942 to 1946.
