= Ismail Smith-Wade-El =

American politician

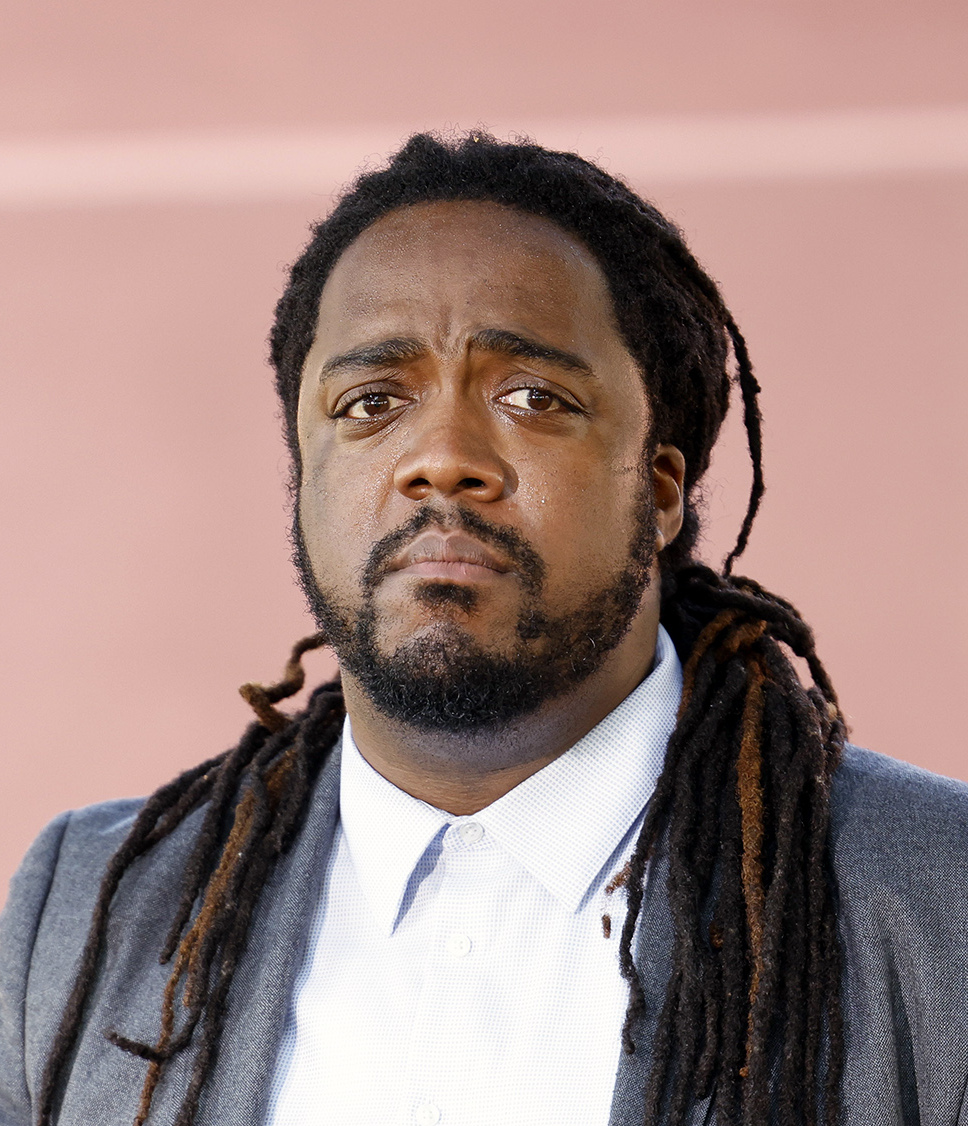
- Smith-Wade-El in 2021

Member of the Pennsylvania House of Representatives from the 49th district
- Incumbent
- Assumed office December 1, 2022
- Preceded by: Bud Cook

Personal details
- Born: 1989 or 1990 (age 35–36) Lancaster, Pennsylvania, U.S.
- Party: Democratic
- Parent: Rita Smith-Wade-El
- Education: Carnegie Mellon University (BA)

Ismail "Izzy" Smith-Wade-El (born 1989 or 1990) is an American politician serving as a member of the Pennsylvania House of Representatives for the 49th district. Elected in November 2022, he assumed office on December 1, 2022.

== Early life and education ==
Smith-Wade-El was born and raised in Lancaster, Pennsylvania. He is the son of Dr. Rita Smith-Wade-El (1948-2018), a professor of psychology and African-American studies at Millersville University. He earned a Bachelor of Arts degree in theatre and anthropology from Carnegie Mellon University in 2014.

== Career ==
Smith-Wade-El served as a member of the Lancaster City Council from 2017 until his resignation in 2022 following his election to the Pennsylvania House of Representatives. He also worked as a program specialist at the Lancaster County Homeless Coalition. Smith-Wade-El was elected to the Pennsylvania House of Representatives in November 2022, becoming the first black and first LGBTQ representative for the 49th district.

== Personal life ==
Smith-Wade-El is Catholic, nonbinary, and identifies as queer.
