= Jill Cooper (politician) =

American politician

Member of the Pennsylvania House of Representatives from the 55th district
- Incumbent
- Assumed office January 3, 2023
- Preceded by: Jason Silvis

Personal details
- Born: c. 1962 Allegheny County, Pennsylvania, U.S.
- Party: Republican
- Spouse: Leighton Cooper (m. 1999)
- Children: 2
- Education: Grove City College (B.S.)
- Alma mater: Plum High School
- Website: repjillcooper.com

Jill Cooper (née Nixon; born c. 1962) is an American politician who is a Republican member of the Pennsylvania House of Representatives, representing the 55th District since 2023.

== Early life, education, and career ==
Born Jill Nixon in Allegheny County, Pennsylvania, she grew up as one of four sisters in Plum, Pennsylvania. Nixon graduated from Plum High School in 1980 and earned a Bachelor of Science degree in management engineering from Grove City College in 1984.

Nixon worked for Alcoa for fourteen years, eventually becoming vice president of sales and overseas marketing at a subsidiary in Atlanta, Georgia. She retired from Alcoa to raise her children.

== Political career ==
In 2008, Cooper was elected to the Westmoreland County Republican Committee, chairing it from 2012 to 2014. She was later elected to the Pennsylvania Republican State Committee in 2014.

Cooper was a political organizer who participated in protests against lockdowns and business closures during the COVID-19 pandemic.

In 2022, Cooper unseated incumbent Pennsylvania State Representative Jason Silvis in the primary with 49% of the vote in an election against Silvis and another primary contender. Cooper said she took the opportunity to run against Silvis, not because she opposed him, but because Silvis's district, the recently redrawn 55th District, had 75% new constituents and was an "open seat" in her mind. She was additionally "passion[ate]" to represent the district. She defeated Democratic candidate Scott Gauss in the general election.

In 2025, Cooper called for removing candidates' home counties from primary election ballots, deeming the notation as unnecessary and biased towards certain counties.

== Personal life ==
Nixon met her husband, Leighton Cooper, in Atlanta, Georgia while she was working for Alcoa. The couple married in 1999 and moved to Murrysville, Pennsylvania in 2005 where they currently reside with their two children.

== Electoral history ==
2022 Pennsylvania House of Representatives Republican primary election, 55th District
Party	Candidate	Votes	%
Republican	Jill Cooper	4,560	48.74
Republican	Jason Silvis (incumbent)	3,937	42.08
Republican	Michelle A. Schmidt	838	8.96
Write-in		20	0.21
Total votes		9,355	100.00

2022 Pennsylvania House of Representatives election, 55th District
Party	Candidate	Votes	%
Republican	Jill Cooper	18,523	61.32
Democratic	Scott Gauss	11,585	38.35
Write-in		98	0.32
Total votes		30,206	100.00

2024 Pennsylvania House of Representatives Republican primary election, District 55
Party	Candidate	Votes	%
Republican	Jill Cooper (incumbent)	6,034	78.08
Republican	Jamie Lingg	1,676	21.69
Write-in		18	0.23
Total votes		7,728	100.00

2024 Pennsylvania House of Representatives election, District 55
Party	Candidate	Votes	%
Republican	Jill Cooper (incumbent)	26,389	67.64
Democratic	Davon Magwood	12,535	32.13
Write-in		91	0.23
Total votes		39,015	100.00
