= Manny Guzman Jr. =

American politician

Manuel M. Guzman, Jr.
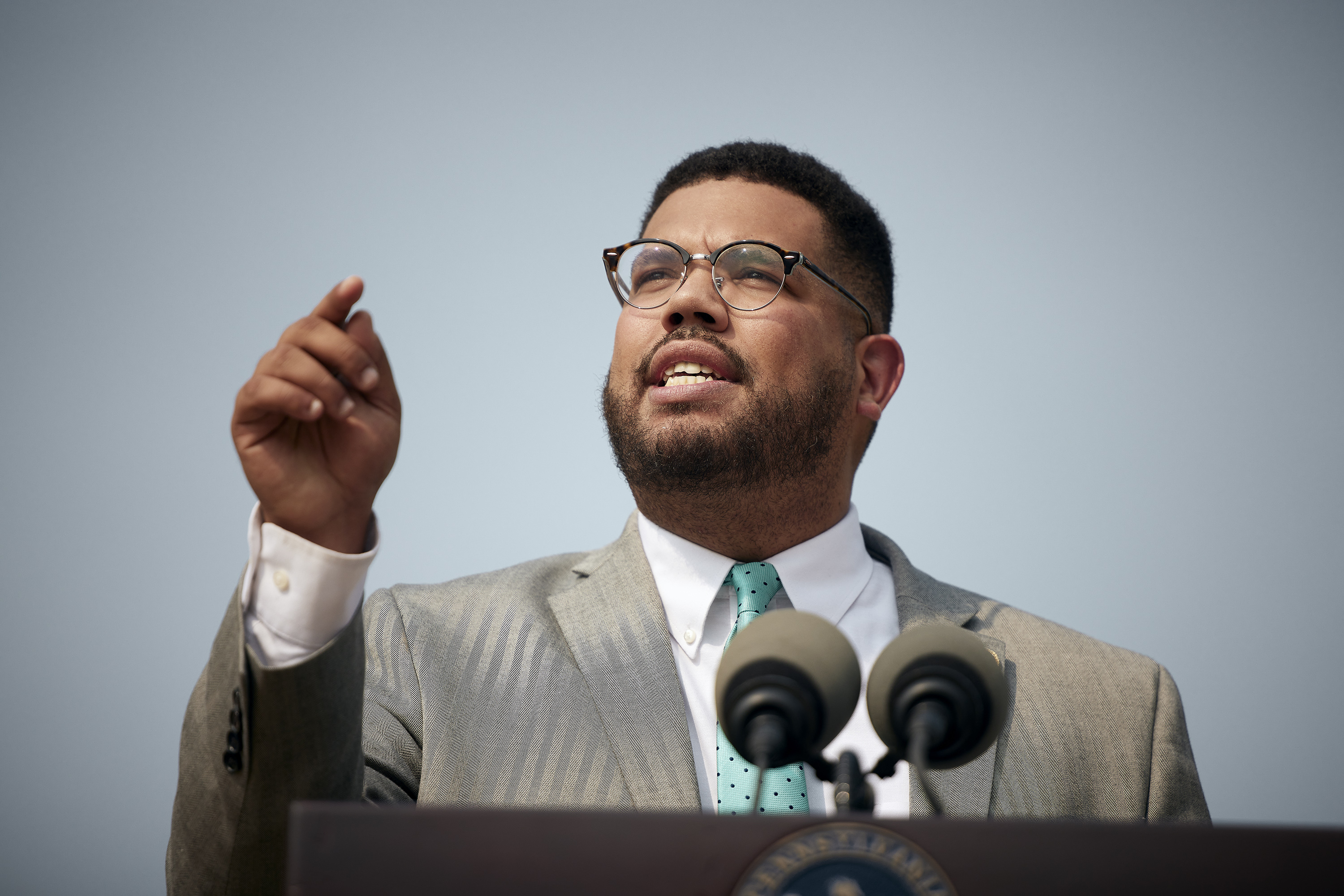

Member of the Pennsylvania House of Representatives from the 127th district
- Incumbent
- Assumed office January 5, 2021
- Preceded by: Thomas R. Caltagirone

Personal details
- Born: March 28, 1988 (age 38)
- Party: Democratic
- Education: Reading High School; Kutztown University of Pennsylvania
- Website: https://voteformannyguzman.com/

Manuel M. "Manny" Guzman Jr. (born c. 1988) is an American politician who is a Democratic member of the Pennsylvania House of Representatives for the 127th district in Kenhorst and Reading, Pennsylvania.

== Background ==
Guzman graduated from Reading High School and studied Professional, Technical, Business, and Scientific Writing at Kutztown University of Pennsylvania.

== Political career ==
Guzman was elected to the Reading School Board in 2013 to a four-year term. In 2017, Guzman won the Democratic primary for Reading City Council's District 1. However, Guzman lived in a different district and was removed from the ballot. In 2018, he lost in the 127th district Democratic Primary, to incumbent Thomas R. Caltagirone. Guzman served as the Coalitions Director with the Pennsylvania Democratic Party from 2018 to January 2020 and as was appointed Deputy Coalitions Director for Latino Engagement in Pennsylvania for Joe Biden's presidential campaign. On January 28, 2020, he announced his candidacy for 127th, after the announcement of incumbent Caltagirone's retirement, who then endorsed Guzman.

Guzman currently sits on the Appropriations, Environmental Resources & Energy, Gaming Oversight, Liquor Control, and Professional Licensure committees.

Political offices
Pennsylvania House of Representatives
Preceded by Thomas Caltagirone	Member of the Pennsylvania House of Representatives from the 127th district 2021–present	Incumbent
