= Bridget Malloy Kosierowski =

American politician

Bridget Kosierowski
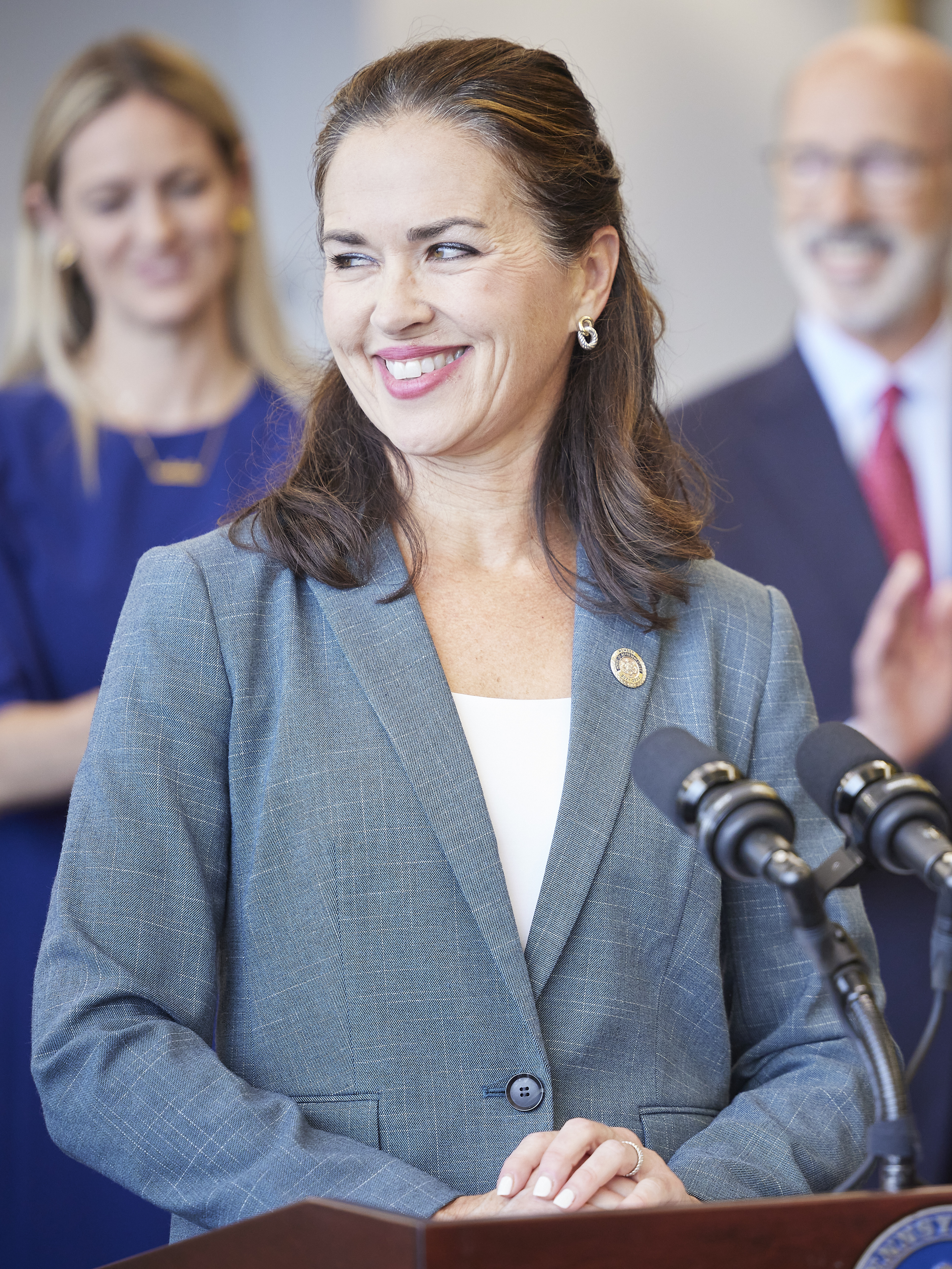
- Kosierowski in 2022

Member of the Pennsylvania House of Representatives from the 114th district
- Incumbent
- Assumed office April 8, 2019
- Preceded by: Sid Michaels Kavulich

Personal details
- Born: March 31, 1972 (age 54) Philadelphia, Pennsylvania, U.S.
- Party: Democratic
- Spouse: Joseph
- Children: 4
- Education: Villanova University (BS)
- Website: Campaign website

Bridget Malloy Kosierowski (born March 31, 1972) is an American politician. She is a Democrat who represents the 114th district in the Pennsylvania House of Representatives.

== Political career ==
In March 2019, Kosierowski won a special election to represent the 114th district in the Pennsylvania House of Representatives, replacing Sid Michaels Kavulich, who had died of complications from open heart surgery. She currently serves on the following House committees:

- Appropriations
- Health
- Insurance
- Professional Licensure

Kosierowski is currently the only registered nurse serving in the Pennsylvania House of Representatives.

Kosierowski won re-election in 2022.

== Electoral record ==
Pennsylvania House of Representatives, District 114 special election, 2019
Party	Candidate	Votes	%
Democratic	Bridget Malloy Kosierowski	6,718	62.45
Republican	Frank Scavo III	4,040	37.55
Total votes		10,758	100.00
Democratic hold			

Pennsylvania House of Representatives, District 114 primary election, 2020
Party	Candidate	Votes	%
Democratic	Bridget Malloy Kosierowski	Unopposed	
Total votes		9,183	100.00

Pennsylvania House of Representatives, District 114 general election, 2020
Party	Candidate	Votes	%
Democratic	Bridget Malloy Kosierowski	19,860	53.82
Republican	James May	17,003	46.08
Total votes		36,863	100.00
Democratic hold			

Pennsylvania House of Representatives, District 114 primary election, 2022
Party	Candidate	Votes	%
Democratic	Bridget Malloy Kosierowski	Unopposed	
Total votes		7,991	100.00

Pennsylvania House of Representatives, District 114 general election, 2022
Party	Candidate	Votes	%
Democratic	Bridget Malloy Kosierowski	16,745	62.40
Republican	David Burgerhoff	10,036	37.40
Total votes		26,781	100.00
Democratic hold			
