= Pennsylvania House of Representatives, District 127 =

American legislative district

Pennsylvania's 127th State House of Representatives district
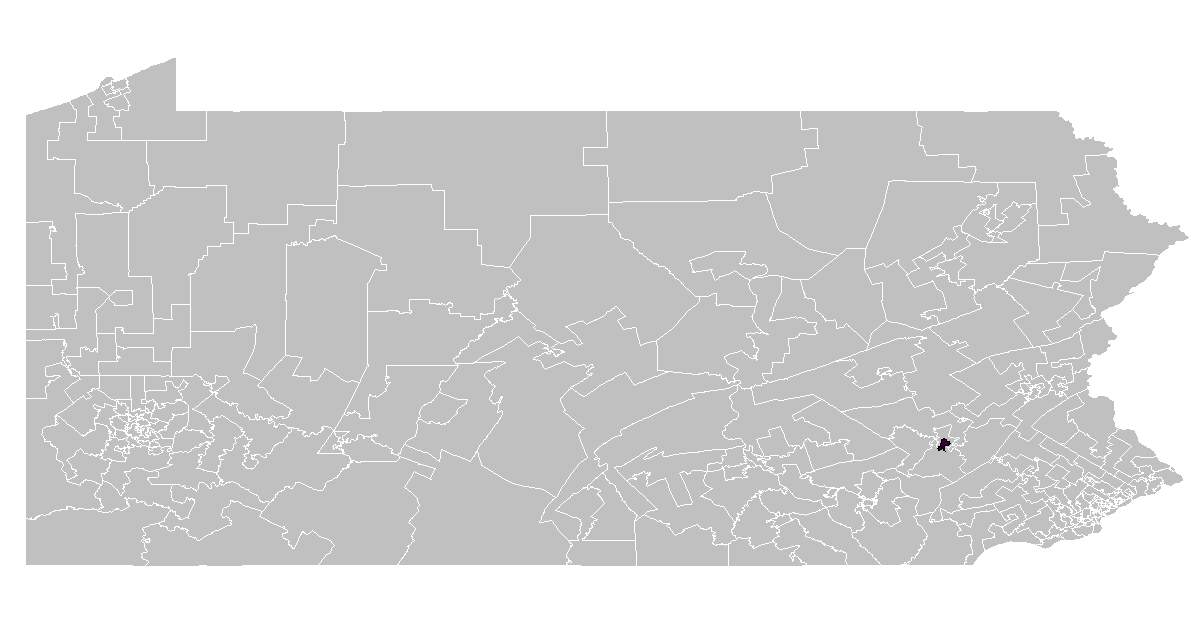
Representative
Manny Guzman Jr. D–Reading

The 127th Pennsylvania House of Representatives District is located in Berks County and includes the following areas:

- Kenhorst
- Reading (PART)
  - Ward 01
  - Ward 02
  - Ward 03
  - Ward 04
  - Ward 05
  - Ward 06 [PART, Division 01]
  - Ward 07
  - Ward 08
  - Ward 09
  - Ward 10
  - Ward 11
  - Ward 12
  - Ward 13
  - Ward 14 [PART, Divisions 01, 04 and 05]
  - Ward 15 [PART, Division 01]
  - Ward 16
  - Ward 17 [PART, Divisions 01 and 02]
  - Ward 18 [PART, Divisions 02 and 03]

== Representatives ==
Representative	Party	Years	District home	Note
Prior to 1969, seats were apportioned by county.
Russell J. LaMarca	Democratic	1969 – 1976		
Thomas R. Caltagirone	Democratic	1977 – 2020	Reading	Not seeking re-election in 2020
Manny Guzman Jr.	Democratic	2021 – Now	Reading	Currently holding office
