= Jason Silvis =

American politician

Member of the Pennsylvania House of Representatives from the 55th district
- In office January 5, 2021 – November 30, 2022
- Preceded by: Joseph Petrarca
- Succeeded by: Jill N. Cooper

Personal details
- Born: Pennsylvania, United States
- Party: Republican
- Website: Official website

Jason Silvis is an American politician. He was a Republican member of the Pennsylvania House of Representatives, representing the 55th district in parts of Westmoreland County, Armstrong County, and Indiana County during the 2021 and 2022 legislative sessions.

== Formative years ==
Born in Pennsylvania, Silvis graduated from Kiski Area High School in 1994 and subsequently pursued business studies at Penn State New Kensington.

== Career ==
A stunt coordinator and performer in the film industry for twenty-two years, Silvis was elected to the Pennsylvania House of Representatives in 2020, representing the 55th district, which includes parts of Westmoreland County, Armstrong County, and Indiana County. He defeated incumbent Democratic representative Joseph Petrarca with 52.3% of the vote in the November general election.

He was unsuccessful in his 2022 bid for reelection.
