= Joseph Petrarca Sr. =

American politician

Joseph A. Petrarca Sr.

Member of the Pennsylvania House of Representatives from the 55th district
- In office 1973–1994
- Preceded by: Gust L. Stemmler
- Succeeded by: Joseph A. Petrarca, Jr.

Personal details
- Born: December 20, 1928 Vandergrift, Pennsylvania
- Died: March 13, 1995 (aged 66) Vandergrift, Pennsylvania
- Party: Democratic
- Spouse: Madeline Petrarca
- Children: Joseph Petrarca, Jr., Kristen Petrarca

Joseph A. Petrarca Sr. (December 20, 1928 – March 13, 1995) is a former Democratic member of the Pennsylvania House of Representatives.
