= Charity Grimm Krupa =

American politician

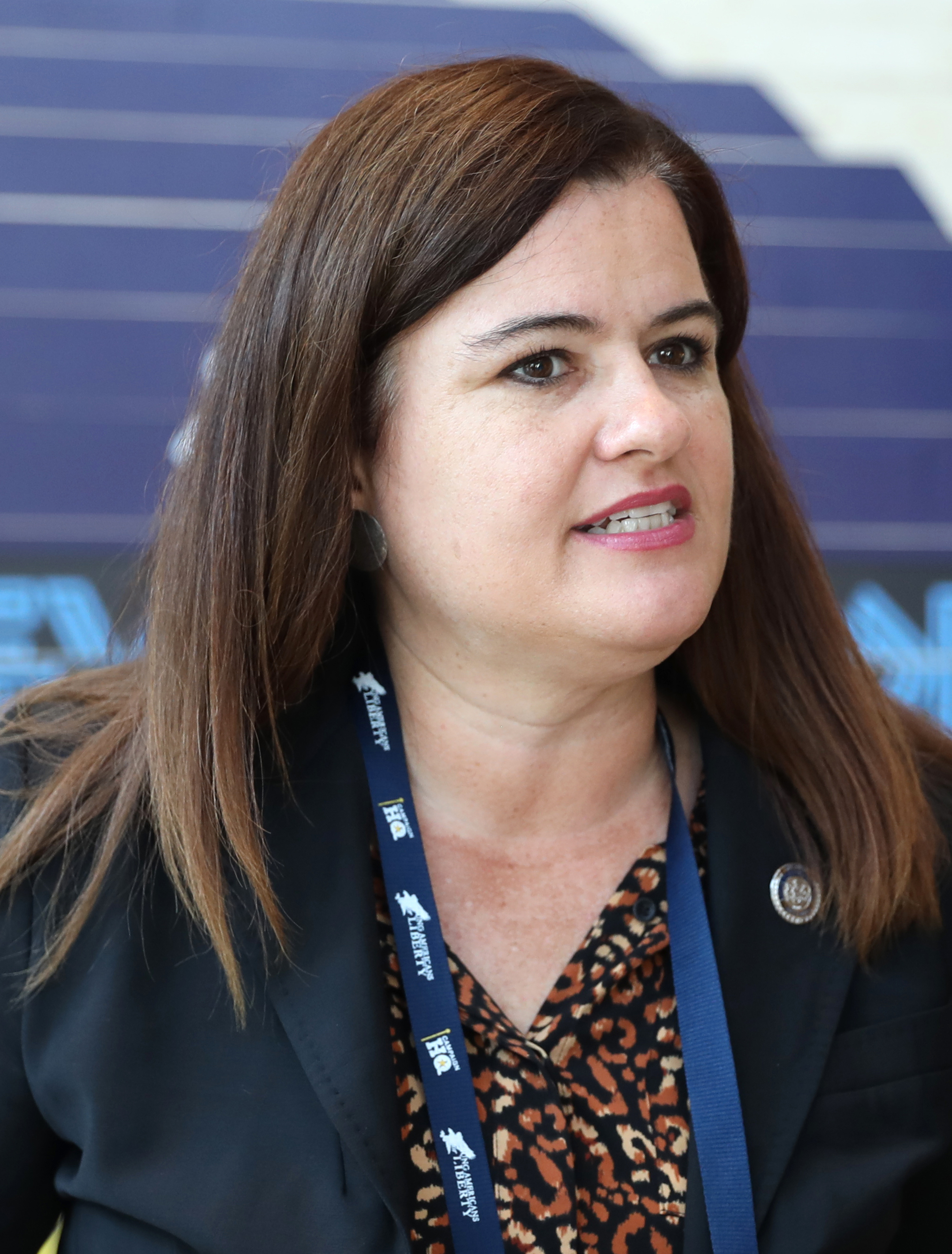

Member of the Pennsylvania House of Representatives from the 51st district
- Incumbent
- Assumed office January 3, 2023

Personal details
- Born: c. 1980 near Fort Bragg, North Carolina, U.S.
- Party: Republican
- Spouse: Brian J. Krupa
- Children: 3
- Education: Albert Gallatin High School (1998); Penn State University (B.A., 2002); West Virginia University (J.D., 2005)
- Website: www.repgrimmkrupa.com

Charity Grimm Krupa (born c. 1980) is an American attorney and Republican member of the Pennsylvania House of Representatives, representing the 51st District since 2023.

== Early life and education ==
Krupa was born into a military family near Fort Bragg, North Carolina. She graduated from Albert Gallatin High School in 1998 and earned a Bachelor of Arts degree in history from Penn State University in 2002. She received her Juris Doctor from West Virginia University in 2005.

== Career ==
Krupa worked as a law clerk for Fayette County Court of Common Pleas Judge Steve Leskinen and later served as Assistant Fayette County Public Defender from 2012 to 2014. She was elected to the Albert Gallatin Area School Board, serving from 2017 to 2020.

== Committee assignments ==
As of 2025, Krupa serves on the following Pennsylvania House committees:

- Appropriations
- Government Oversight
- Agriculture & Rural Affairs
- Health
- Veterans Affairs & Emergency Preparedness (Republican Secretary)

== Elections ==
Year	Office	Result	Vote (%)	Opponent	Vote (%)
2015	Magisterial District Judge (Fayette County, 14‑3‑02)	Lost	2,111 (48.5%)	Dan Shimshock	2,241 (51.5%)
2022	Pennsylvania House District 51	Won	13,383 (61.8%)	Richard Ringer	8,269 (38.2%)
2024	Pennsylvania House District 51 (re‑election)	Won	19,945 (65.6%)	George Rattay	10,425 (34.3%)

== Political positions and endorsements ==
Krupa supports limited government, opposes critical race theory, and is a lifetime member of the National Rifle Association of America. She is pro-life with exceptions for rape, incest, and the life of the mother, supports raising the minimum wage (but not to $15/hour), and advocates reducing property and gasoline taxes.

=== Endorsements ===
- Gun Owners of America (GOA)
- NRA Political Victory Fund
- Firearm Owners Against Crime (FOAC)

== Controversies ==
By mid‑2025, Krupa’s confrontational approach, legal background, and office practices drew criticism.

=== Lost legal cases ===
In 2019, Krupa represented John and Rosa Stoffa in a property dispute seeking $58,000. The case settled for $20,001—less than half the original claim. A client remarked: > “We hoped for justice, but we had to settle for scraps. I felt let down.”

=== Family legal history ===
Krupa’s father, Michael Grimm, was named in a 2022 malpractice lawsuit. Three of five claims were dismissed, but two went to trial before he was ultimately cleared.

=== Legislative disputes and social media controversies ===
Krupa’s clashes with House leadership—including accusing them of “gross incompetence” during a roll-call vote dispute and being threatened with loss of recognition by the Appropriations chair—have further eroded trust.

Her social media posts—including calls for mandatory drug testing of lawmakers and criticism of marijuana legalization—were also viewed as divisive distractions from district priorities.

=== Judicial ambitions ===
In June 2025, Krupa confirmed she was considering resigning to run for a judgeship on the Fayette County Court of Common Pleas.
