= Joseph Petrarca Jr. =

American politician

Joseph Petrarca

Member of the Pennsylvania House of Representatives from the 55th district
- In office January 3, 1995 – November 30, 2020
- Preceded by: Joseph Petrarca Sr.
- Succeeded by: Jason Silvis

Personal details
- Born: April 2, 1961 (age 65) Vandergrift, Pennsylvania
- Party: Democratic
- Spouse: Elise
- Parent: Joseph Petrarca Sr.
- Education: Saint Vincent College; University of Pittsburgh School of Law
- Website: pahouse.com/petrarca

Joseph A. "Joe" Petrarca Jr. (born April 2, 1961) was a Democratic member of the Pennsylvania House of Representatives from 1995 to 2020.
