= 2025 Pennsylvania Supreme Court election =

2025 Pennsylvania Supreme Court retention election
- November 4, 2025
- Shall Christine Donohue be retained for an additional term as Justice of the Supreme Court of the Commonwealth of Pennsylvania?

Results
Yes	61.80%
No	38.20%

- Shall Kevin M. Dougherty be retained for an additional term as Justice of the Supreme Court of the Commonwealth of Pennsylvania?

Results
Yes	61.79%
No	38.21%

- Shall David Wecht be retained for an additional term as Justice of the Supreme Court of the Commonwealth of Pennsylvania?

Results
Yes	61.46%
No	38.54%

The 2025 Pennsylvania Supreme Court retention election was held on November 4, 2025, to determine whether three Pennsylvania Supreme Court justices would serve their second 10-year terms. Christine Donohue, Kevin Dougherty, and David Wecht, who were first elected as Democrats in 2015, were all retained by large margins, including in over a dozen counties (Note: Voted to retain all three justices: Erie; Beaver; Washington; Union; Montour; Columbia; Luzerne; Pike; Monroe; Northampton; Bucks; Berks; Lancaster; Cumberland; Westmoreland; York; Voted to retain Dougherty only: Northumberland) won by Donald Trump in 2024.

== Background ==
At the time of the election, the Supreme Court of Pennsylvania had a 5–2 Democratic majority. (Note: In May 2026, David Wecht left the Democratic Party, citing concerns over growing tolerance of antisemitism within the party. He now sits on the court as an independent.) The court has been Democratic-controlled since 2015, when Donohue, Dougherty, and Wecht won election to their seats.

Had voters chosen not to retain any of the justices, Governor Josh Shapiro could have appointed a temporary replacement until 2027—with approval from two-thirds of the Republican-controlled Pennsylvania Senate—when an election would have been held for a permanent replacement. If all three justices were not retained and the Senate did not approve Shapiro's nominees, the court would have been split with two Democrats and two Republicans, which would have left the court "unlikely to reach majority decisions", according to The Philadelphia Inquirer.

Since retention elections were established in 1968, only one Pennsylvania justice, Russell Nigro in 2005, has not been retained.

== Campaign ==
The justices themselves were not permitted to directly campaign. Instead, they engaged in a statewide speaking tour where they pledged to exercise their judicial power without partisan bias. The Philadelphia Inquirer said that over $14 million had been raised in support of retention, while the Brennan Center for Justice estimated that $7.5 million was spent by liberal political action committees on TV ads in support of a 'Yes' vote to "protect elections and preserve abortion rights". They also claimed that the race was the second most expensive retention election in U.S. history.

Deborah Gross, executive director of the non-profit Pennsylvanians for Modern Courts, claimed that the significant spending 'pervert[ed] the intent of the retention process' by focusing on party affiliation rather than the justices' records. Talking to the Pennsylvania Capital-Star, Gross said, "[i]f someone is not doing their job properly, if they're not showing up for court, if they're doing bad acts, if they have judicial conduct issues. Those are reasons why someone should not be retained."

The Democratic National Committee announced a "six-figure investment" into the Pennsylvania Democratic Party to help support retaining the 3 judges, with DNC Chair Ken Martin issuing a statement saying that "[t]he Pennsylvania Supreme Court is on the frontlines of decisions related to voting rights, redistricting, abortion protections" and that "[t]he stakes couldn't be higher."

The state and national chapters of the American Civil Liberties Union spent over $900,000 during the campaign, including $500,000 on mailers informing voters about the race "and what it means for their civil rights and civil liberties." The organization's website did not make an explicit case for or against retaining any of the judges, though their disclosure records described the expenditures as supportive of retention.

Conservative activist Scott Presler told Fox News that his PAC, Early Vote Action, was targeting Bucks County—which voted Republican in 2024 for the first time in almost four decades—by sending 100,000 text messages as part of a campaign that recognizes Charlie Kirk’s birthday. Presler also stated that the group was producing stickers that say 'I voted in honor of Charlie' with a "really classy photo" of Kirk with his hands together in prayer. Bucks County chose to retain all 3 justices by over 20 points.

Multiple PACs affiliated with Republican businessman Matthew Brouillette and funded almost entirely by billionaire Jeff Yass—a registered Libertarian—spent millions on social media ads, mailers, and text messages opposing retaining all 3 judges, telling voters they should "term limit the woke Democrat Pennsylvania Supreme Court."

=== Mailer controversy ===
The Commonwealth Leaders Fund, a Yass-affiliated PAC, was criticized by the advocacy group Fair Districts PA after they sent out mailers claiming that the "liberal Supreme Court gerrymandered our congressional districts to help Democrats win." The mailers also featured an outdated image of two congressional districts from a map that was drawn up by the Republican-controlled state legislature in 2011 and later overturned for partisan gerrymandering that disproportionately benefitted the Republican Party.

After the mailer controversy was publicized, Pennsylvania Democratic Party chair Eugene DePasquale issued a statement condemning "MAGA billionaires" for funneling money into the election. In late September, 2025, the Pennsylvania Working Families Party organized a protest outside Susquehanna International Group, a financial trading company founded by Jeff Yass, criticizing his involvement in the campaign and urging passers-by to "Vote 'Yes', not Yass".

The League of Women Voters of Pennsylvania declined to endorse for or against retention, though they criticized the leading 'No' campaign PACs for misleading voters by including inaccurate information on their campaign mailers. In 2017, the group argued in a lawsuit that Republican-gerrymandered maps violate the state constitution's guarantee of free and fair elections. The state Supreme Court, which included the 3 justices up for retention, ruled in favor of the claim.

== Election logistics ==
The voter registration deadline was set for October 20, 2025, two weeks before the election. With limited exceptions, ballots had to be received by 8pm on election day to be counted. Pennsylvania permits the use of mail-in ballots, including no-excuse postal votes, allowing any registered voter to request a mail-in ballot. However, state law prohibits pre-processing of received mail-in ballots, meaning election officials had to wait until election day to begin ballot curing.

Republican activists and politicians urged voters to cast mail-in ballots before election day, despite Donald Trump's repeated support for a ban on mail-in voting. The Pennsylvania Republican Party encouraged voters to request an absentee ballot, posting on Twitter that "if there is even a 1% chance that you might miss the 2025 Election, sign up for a mail-in ballot today! It's quick and easy!"

Increased Republican support for mail-in voting was also seen in the New Jersey gubernatorial election, where unsuccessful Republican candidate Jack Ciattarelli boasted that "more Republicans [have] return[ed] vote-by-mail ballots than ever before." Similarly, the California Republican Party urged the use of mail-in ballots to vote against Proposition 50, a ballot measure that permitted redrawing the state's congressional districts.

Despite all three justices originally running as Democrats, retention elections are considered nonpartisan, meaning that ballots do not feature a candidate's party affiliation. Votebeat spoke to a voter who expressed frustration over this, saying that they weren’t immediately sure if the justices were Republicans or Democrats. Chris Borick, a professor of political science at Muhlenberg College, told Votebeat that the removal of partisan designation on a retention ballot can confuse voters.

=== Chester County provisional ballots ===
On election day, NBC News reported that independent and unaffiliated voters in Chester County were forced to cast provisional ballots after poll books listing only Republicans and Democrats were delivered to polling sites, meaning that independent voters didn't appear as registered voters, and their ballots were only counted after election officials were able to prove their eligibility. A county spokeswoman later confirmed that voters registered as Libertarians or Greens were also forced to cast their votes with provisional ballots.

Chester County posted on social media that "supplemental poll books" were sent out to 230 polling sites, allowing voters to vote normally throughout the afternoon and evening. A judge later extended polling hours in the county until 10pm rather than 8pm to allow impacted voters to cast non-provisional ballots.

Two weeks after election day, nonprofit organization Spotlight PA confirmed that roughly 11,200 of the 12,600 provisional ballots used in Chester County were counted in the final tally. The newspaper also reported that the Republican Committee of Chester County challenged around 1,400 provisional ballots, some of which were missing signatures from voters or poll workers.

In a hearing on November 17, 2025, the Republican Committee dropped most of their objections, with the exception of ballots received in unsigned envelopes, and ballots that had no envelopes at all. The Chester County Board of Elections, who held the hearing, voted 2–1 to accept ballots where the voter had not signed the envelope in the correct place, as well as signed ballots that were received without envelopes. The board also voted unanimously to reject three unsigned ballots without envelopes. Some 300 other provisional ballots were rejected for other reasons, including a number of ballots filled out by unregistered voters.

That same day, Chester County officials announced they had hired a law firm to investigate the missing poll books. According to CBS News, investigators interviewed county staff and examined current election processes before making their final recommendations for improvement at a public meeting. On December 19, 2025, the investigation concluded, though county officials did not publicly reveal the cause of the error. The law firm concluded that the poll book issue was caused by "simple human error" in their report, which also proposed new reforms and criticized the county's lack of safeguards.

== Seat 2 ==
2025 Pennsylvania Supreme Court Seat 2 retention election
- November 4, 2025
- Shall Christine Donohue be retained for an additional term as Justice of the Supreme Court of the Commonwealth of Pennsylvania?

Results
Choice	Votes	%
Yes	2,231,527	61.80%
No	1,379,599	38.20%
Total votes	3,611,126	100.00%
County results
Yes
80–90%
70–80%
60–70%
50–60%
No
70–80%
60–70%
50–60%

=== Background ===
Christine Donohue was first elected in 2015, and assumed office the year after. Prior to being elected, Donohue served on the Superior Court of Pennsylvania, as well as on the Pennsylvania Judicial Conduct Board and the Pennsylvania Court of Judicial Discipline. She also served as a member of the Pennsylvania Board of Law Examiners. Before that, she served as a civil trial lawyer and litigator for nearly three decades.

In 2024, Donohue voted with the majority to order lower courts to reconsider the legality of barring Medicaid recipients from receiving abortion services.

"The Pennsylvania Constitution secures the fundamental right to reproductive autonomy, which includes the right to decide whether to have an abortion or carry a pregnancy to term."

— Justice Christine Donohue

In 2022, Donohue wrote the majority opinion in the case which upheld Pennsylvania's no-excuse mail voting law. The law allows Pennsylvania voters to apply for mail-in ballots without providing a reason why they need to vote by mail. That same year, she sided with the majority in a case that determined Pennsylvania's school funding system was unconstitutional because it disadvantaged lower-income school districts.

=== Endorsements ===
Support retention

Executive branch officials

- Barack Obama, former president of the United States (2009–2017)
- Eric Holder, former U.S. attorney general (2009–2015)

U.S. senators

- John Fetterman, Pennsylvania (2023–present)
- Elissa Slotkin, Michigan (2025–present)

U.S. representatives

- Chris Deluzio, PA-17 (2023–present)

Statewide officials

- Josh Shapiro, governor of Pennsylvania (2023–present)

State legislators

- Malcolm Kenyatta, state representative from the 181st district (2019–present) and vice chair of the Democratic National Committee (2025–present)
- Bridget Malloy Kosierowski, state representative from the 114th district (2019–present)
- Kyle Donahue, state representative from the 113th district (2023–present)
- Jim Haddock, state representative from the 118th district (2023–present)
- Eddie Day Pashinski, state representative from the 121st district (2007–present)

Local officials

- Cherelle Parker, mayor of Philadelphia (2024–present)

Party officials

- Ken Martin, chair of the Democratic National Committee (2025–present)

Labor unions

- AFL-CIO Pennsylvania
- American Federation of State, County and Municipal Employees District Councils 33 and 47
- Fraternal Order of Police Pennsylvania State Lodge
- Pennsylvania Association of Staff Nurses and Allied Professionals
- Pennsylvania State Education Association
- OPCMIA Local 526
- International Brotherhood of Boilermakers Local 154
- Greater PA Regional Council of Carpenters
- Ironworkers Local 3
- United Mine Workers of America
- Laborers District Council of Western Pennsylvania
- International Union of Operating Engineers Local 66
- United Association Plumbers Local 27
- United Association Plumbers and Pipefitters Local 354
- United Association Sprinkler Fitters Local 542
- United Association Steamfitters Local 449
- United Union of Roofers, Waterproofers and Allied Workers Local 37
- International Union of Bricklayers and Allied Craftworkers PA Local 9
- Sheet Metal Workers' International Association Local 12
- International Association of Insulators Local 2
- International Brotherhood of Electrical Workers Local 5
- International Union of Painters and Allied Trades District Council 57
- Association of Pennsylvania State College and University Faculties
- Service Employees International Union Local 668

Organizations

- Conservation Voters of Pennsylvania
- Pennsylvania Bar Association
- EMILYs List
- Jewish Democratic Council of America
- Planned Parenthood Pennsylvania PAC
- Reproductive Freedom for All
- National Organization for Women Pennsylvania PAC
- Democratic Legislative Campaign Committee
- Red Wine & Blue
- National Democratic Redistricting Committee
- Feminist Majority Foundation

Political parties

- Pennsylvania Democratic Party

Newspapers

- The Philadelphia Inquirer
- Philadelphia Gay News
- The Philadelphia Tribune
Oppose retention

Executive branch officials

- Donald Trump, president of the United States (2017–2021, 2025–present)

U.S. senators

- Dave McCormick, Pennsylvania (2025–present)

Statewide officials

- Stacy Garrity, treasurer of Pennsylvania (2021–present) and 2026 gubernatorial candidate

Individuals

- Scott Presler, conservative activist

Organizations

- Republican State Leadership Committee

Political parties

- Pennsylvania Republican Party

=== Fundraising ===
Campaign finance reports as of November 24, 2025
Candidate	Raised	Spent	Cash on hand
Christine Donohue	$891,029	$820,521	$69,542
Source: PA Department of State

=== Polling ===
Poll source	Date(s) administered	Sample size (Note: Key: A – all adults RV – registered voters LV – likely voters V – unclear)	Margin of error	For retain	Against retain	Undecided
Franklin & Marshall	September 24 – October 5, 2025	929 (RV)	± 4.0%	31%	27%	42%
Franklin & Marshall	September 24 – October 5, 2025	831 (LV)	± 4.0%	39%	29%	32%

=== Results ===
Justice Christine Donohue retention, 2025
Choice	Votes	%
For	2,231,527	61.80
Against	1,379,599	38.20
Total	3,611,126	100.00
Source: Commonwealth of Pennsylvania Election Results

== Seat 3 ==
2025 Pennsylvania Supreme Court Seat 3 retention election
- November 4, 2025
- Shall Kevin M. Dougherty be retained for an additional term as Justice of the Supreme Court of the Commonwealth of Pennsylvania?

Results
Choice	Votes	%
Yes	2,227,880	61.79%
No	1,377,687	38.21%
Total votes	3,605,567	100.00%
County results
Yes
80–90%
70–80%
60–70%
50–60%
No
70–80%
60–70%
50–60%

=== Background ===
Kevin Dougherty was first elected in 2015, and assumed office the year after. He began his law career as an assistant district attorney at the Philadelphia District Attorney's Office, before going into private practice. He was later be appointed to the Philadelphia Court of Common Pleas, becoming administrative judge and overseeing reforms.

Like both other judges up for retention, Dougherty sided with the majority in the 2024 abortion ruling and the case that deemed Pennsylvania's school funding system unconstitutional.

In 2024, Dougherty authored the decision that upheld Stroud Township's restrictions on where gun ranges can be located. Dougherty also spearheaded the creation of the Office of Behavioral Health, who seek to improve outcomes for those in the criminal justice system with behavioral or mental health issues.

"Mental health challenges are no longer a quiet issue on the sidelines; they are a full-blown crisis affecting every part of life in Pennsylvania."

— Justice Kevin Dougherty

Dougherty also led initiatives to create more inclusive courtrooms for people with sensory issues.

=== Endorsements ===
Support retention

Executive branch officials

- Barack Obama, former president of the United States (2009–2017)
- Eric Holder, former U.S. attorney general (2009–2015)

U.S. senators

- John Fetterman, Pennsylvania (2023–present)
- Elissa Slotkin, Michigan (2025–present)

U.S. representatives

- Chris Deluzio, PA-17 (2023–present)

Statewide officials

- Josh Shapiro, governor of Pennsylvania (2023–present)

State legislators

- Malcolm Kenyatta, state representative from the 181st district (2019–present) and vice chair of the Democratic National Committee (2025–present)
- Bridget Malloy Kosierowski, state representative from the 114th district (2019–present)
- Kyle Donahue, state representative from the 113th district (2023–present)
- Jim Haddock, state representative from the 118th district (2023–present)
- Eddie Day Pashinski, state representative from the 121st district (2007–present)

Local officials

- Cherelle Parker, mayor of Philadelphia (2024–present)

Party officials

- Ken Martin, chair of the Democratic National Committee (2025–present)

Labor unions

- AFL-CIO Pennsylvania
- American Federation of State, County and Municipal Employees District Councils 33 and 47
- Pennsylvania State Education Association
- Fraternal Order of Police Pennsylvania State Lodge
- Fraternal Order of Police Philadelphia Lodge 5
- Service Employees International Union Local 668

Organizations

- Planned Parenthood Pennsylvania PAC
- National Organization for Women Pennsylvania PAC
- Jewish Democratic Council of America
- Feminist Majority Foundation
- Democratic Legislative Campaign Committee
- Conservation Voters of Pennsylvania
- Reproductive Freedom for All
- National Democratic Redistricting Committee
- Red Wine & Blue

Political parties

- Pennsylvania Democratic Party

Newspapers

- The Philadelphia Inquirer
- Philadelphia Gay News
- The Philadelphia Tribune
Oppose retention

Executive branch officials

- Donald Trump, president of the United States (2017–2021, 2025–present)

U.S. senators

- Dave McCormick, Pennsylvania (2025–present)

Statewide officials

- Stacy Garrity, treasurer of Pennsylvania (2021–present) and 2026 gubernatorial candidate

Individuals

- Scott Presler, conservative activist

Organizations

- Republican State Leadership Committee

Political parties

- Pennsylvania Republican Party

=== Fundraising ===
Campaign finance reports as of November 24, 2025
Candidate	Raised	Spent	Cash on hand
Kevin Dougherty	$2,623,079	$2,614,952	$8,126
Source: PA Department of State

=== Polling ===
Poll source	Date(s) administered	Sample size	Margin of error	For retain	Against retain	Undecided
Franklin & Marshall	September 24 – October 5, 2025	929 (RV)	± 4.0%	30%	19%	51%
Franklin & Marshall	September 24 – October 5, 2025	831 (LV)	± 4.0%	39%	22%	39%

=== Results ===
Justice Kevin Dougherty retention, 2025
Choice	Votes	%
For	2,227,880	61.79
Against	1,377,687	38.21
Total	3,605,567	100.00
Source: Commonwealth of Pennsylvania Election Results

== Seat 4 ==
2025 Pennsylvania Supreme Court Seat 4 retention election
- November 4, 2025
- Shall David Wecht be retained for an additional term as Justice of the Supreme Court of the Commonwealth of Pennsylvania?

Results
Choice	Votes	%
Yes	2,209,781	61.46%
No	1,385,673	38.54%
Total votes	3,595,454	100.00%
County results
Yes
80–90%
70–80%
60–70%
50–60%
No
70–80%
60–70%
50–60%

=== Background ===
David Wecht was first elected in 2015, and assumed office the year after. Wecht began his law career clerking for Judge George MacKinnon on the U.S. Court of Appeals in Washington, D.C.

He founded a private practice in 1996, and later served on the Superior Court of Pennsylvania.

Wecht sided with the majority in the 2024 abortion ruling, writing a concurring opinion, and stating that he agreed with the Majority that, "under the Equal Rights Amendment to the Pennsylvania Constitution, a sex-based distinction is presumptively unconstitutional."

"The Pennsylvania Constitution’s [Equal Rights Amendment] (Note: Article I, § 28) did away with the antiquated and misogynistic notion that a woman has no say over what happens to her own body."

— Justice David Wecht

Wecht also voted to uphold former governor Tom Wolf's emergency powers in 2020 during the COVID-19 pandemic. In a November 2020 lawsuit challenging Joe Biden's victory in Pennsylvania, Wecht asserted that the attempt to overturn the results of the election was "futile" and "a dangerous game."

=== Endorsements ===
Support retention

Executive branch officials

- Barack Obama, former president of the United States (2009–2017)
- Eric Holder, former U.S. attorney general (2009–2015)

U.S. senators

- John Fetterman, Pennsylvania (2023–present)
- Elissa Slotkin, Michigan (2025–present)

U.S. representatives

- Chris Deluzio, PA-17 (2023–present)

Statewide officials

- Josh Shapiro, governor of Pennsylvania (2023–present)

State legislators

- Malcolm Kenyatta, state representative from the 181st district (2019–present) and vice chair of the Democratic National Committee (2025–present)
- Bridget Malloy Kosierowski, state representative from the 114th district (2019–present)
- Kyle Donahue, state representative from the 113th district (2023–present)
- Jim Haddock, state representative from the 118th district (2023–present)
- Eddie Day Pashinski, state representative from the 121st district (2007–present)

Local officials

- Cherelle Parker, mayor of Philadelphia (2024–present)

Party officials

- Ken Martin, chair of the Democratic National Committee (2025–present)

Labor unions

- AFL-CIO Pennsylvania
- Pennsylvania State Education Association
- Fraternal Order of Police Pennsylvania State Lodge
- International Brotherhood of Electrical Workers Local 5
- Ironworkers Local 3
- International Union of Painters and Allied Trades District Council 57
- International Union of Operating Engineers Local 66
- Pittsburgh Firefighters Local 1
- United Association Plumbers Local 27
- United Association Plumbers Local 690
- Sheet Metal Workers' International Association Local 12
- United Association Sprinkler Fitters Local 692
- United Association Steamfitters Local 449
- Teamsters Local 205
- United Association Plumbers and Pipefitters Local 524
- Association of Pennsylvania State College and University Faculties
- American Federation of State, County and Municipal Employees District Councils 33 and 47
- Pittsburgh Federation of Teachers
- Service Employees International Union Local 668

Organizations

- Pennsylvania Bar Association
- Planned Parenthood Pennsylvania PAC
- National Organization for Women Pennsylvania PAC
- Jewish Democratic Council of America
- Reproductive Freedom for All
- People for the American Way
- Democratic Legislative Campaign Committee
- Conservation Voters of Pennsylvania
- Feminist Majority Foundation
- National Democratic Redistricting Committee
- Red Wine & Blue

Political parties

- Pennsylvania Democratic Party

Newspapers

- The Philadelphia Inquirer
- Philadelphia Gay News
- The Philadelphia Tribune
Oppose retention

Executive branch officials

- Donald Trump, president of the United States (2017–2021, 2025–present)

U.S. senators

- Dave McCormick, Pennsylvania (2025–present)

Statewide officials

- Stacy Garrity, treasurer of Pennsylvania (2021–present) and 2026 gubernatorial candidate

Individuals

- Scott Presler, conservative activist

Organizations

- Republican State Leadership Committee

Political parties

- Pennsylvania Republican Party

=== Fundraising ===
Campaign finance reports as of November 24, 2025
Candidate	Raised	Spent	Cash on hand
David Wecht	$1,226,760	$1,227,409	$0
Source: PA Department of State

=== Polling ===
Poll source	Date(s) administered	Sample size	Margin of error	For retain	Against retain	Undecided
Franklin & Marshall	September 24 – October 5, 2025	929 (RV)	± 4.0%	25%	21%	55%
Franklin & Marshall	September 24 – October 5, 2025	831 (LV)	± 4.0%	38%	25%	38%

=== Results ===
Justice David Wecht retention, 2025
Choice	Votes	%
For	2,209,781	61.46
Against	1,385,673	38.54
Total	3,595,454	100.00
Source: Commonwealth of Pennsylvania Election Results

== Analysis ==
County results map comparing retention results to the 2024 presidential election results Trump; against retaining all Harris; for retaining all Trump; for retaining all Trump; for retaining Dougherty

The justices were retained by large margins, with over 60% of the votes on all three ballot questions being in favor of retention. 16 counties (Note: Erie; Beaver; Washington; Union; Montour; Columbia; Luzerne; Pike; Monroe; Northampton; Bucks; Berks; Lancaster; Cumberland; Westmoreland; York) that voted for Donald Trump in the 2024 presidential election chose to retain all three justices.

Anti-retention campaigners heavily targeted Bucks County, which the Democrats had carried for 8 consecutive elections before it was won by Trump in 2024 by less than three hundred votes. The county voted to retain each of the justices with margins of over 20 points.

In Northumberland County, which Trump carried by 40 points in 2024, voters chose to retain only one justice, Dougherty. In Union County, where a Democratic candidate has not been backed at the presidential level since 1832, all three justices were retained by an average of approximately 8%.

Though Northeastern Pennsylvania has reliably voted Republican on the presidential level for decades, the three justices outperformed Kamala Harris in counties like Luzerne and Montour, both of which chose to retain the three justices on 10 point margins despite Trump carrying them by 20 points. Chris Borick, director of the Muhlenberg College Institute of Public Opinion, told The Philadelphia Inquirer that Democratic or independent voters upset with the Trump administration were more motivated to vote than they previously were, while Republican voters had a lower turnout compared to 2024.

A post-election review by nonprofit organization Spotlight PA noted unusually high turnout for an off-year election, particularly in Philadelphia and the surrounding suburbs, which are Democratic strongholds. Conservative columnist Timothy P. Carney said that the Pennsylvania Republican Party alienated suburban moderate voters by campaigning for the removal of the judges. Writing for the American Enterprise Institute, Carney said that opposing retention "made Republicans look extreme, and made the election about abortion," which played poorly with swing voters.

== Aftermath ==
=== Reactions ===
Despite the heavy spending, many voters reported that they had seen little political messaging leading up to the election. Speaking to Votebeat, some voters in favor of retention said they wanted to send a message to Donald Trump when casting their ballots, though few voters claimed to be familiar with the justices' specific rulings. A representative from One Pennsylvania, a progressive non-profit, said the vote was a rejection of Jeff Yass and "the MAGA agenda."

After the election was called, Justice Donohue released a statement saying that the result shows that "Pennsylvanians have trust in the independence of the Pennsylvania Supreme Court and, additionally, appreciate the importance of a stable Pennsylvania Supreme Court." Governor Josh Shapiro called the results "a resounding message" of support, and that "the good people of Pennsylvania will always stand for freedom."

Former U.S. attorney general Eric Holder, who endorsed all three justices for retention, stated that the result "demonstrates that an engaged citizenry is more powerful than the billionaires and special interests," while DNC chair Ken Martin, who actively campaigned in support of retention, said the election was a victory for reproductive rights and voting rights, claiming that "Pennsylvania delivered a message on behalf of the entire country: No matter how rich you are, and no matter how much power you think you might have, our courts are not for sale."

In an opinion piece after the election, leading 'No' campaigner Matthew Brouillette called for increased Republican spending to match that of the Democrats, telling conservative groups to "send in [their] own cavalry to win Pennsylvania."

== See also ==
- 2025 Pennsylvania elections
- Judicial retention
