= Scott Presler =

American conservative activist (born 1988)

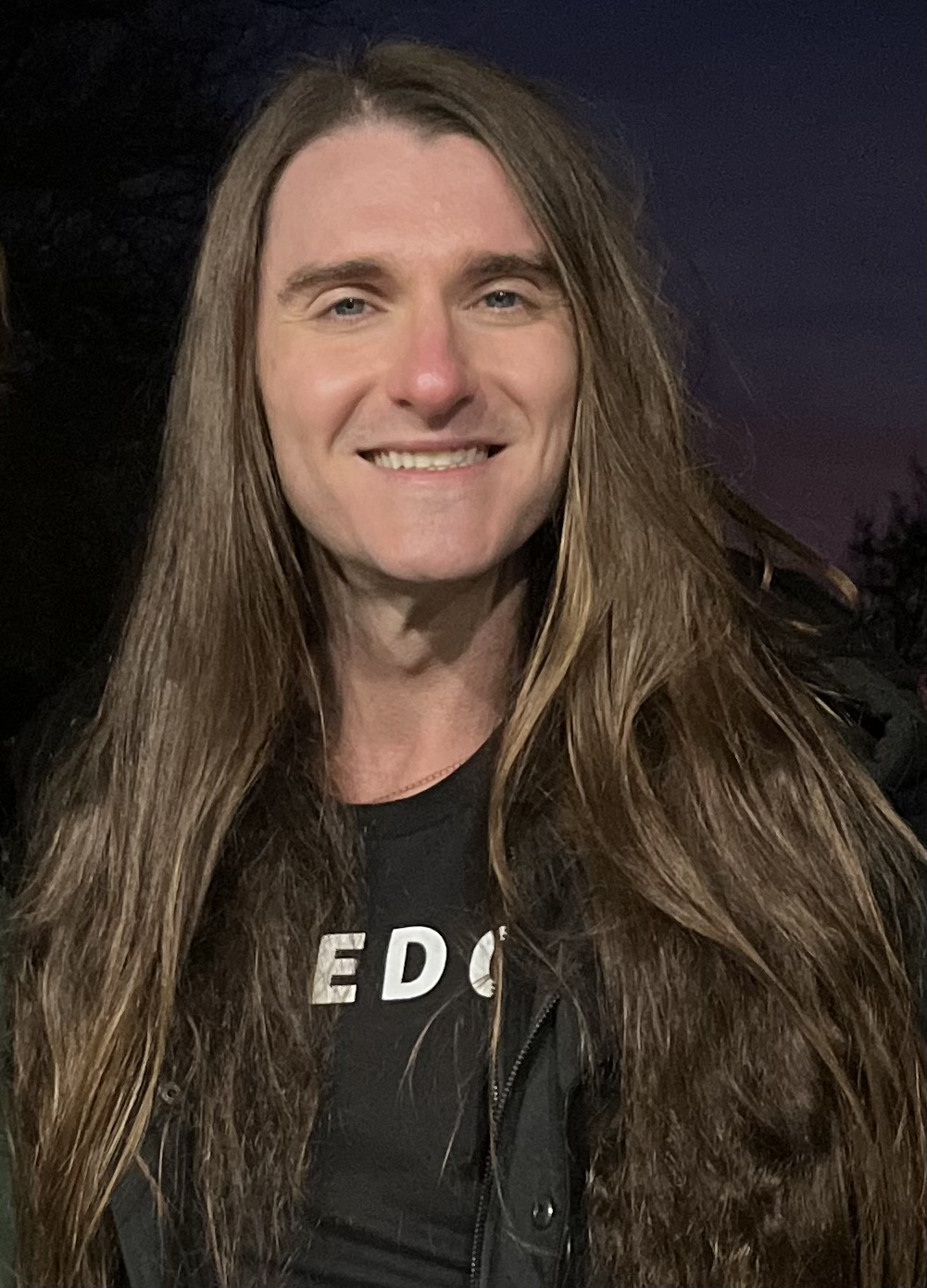
- Presler in 2026
- Born: Scott Ryan Presler; May 15, 1988 (age 38); Jacksonville, Florida, U.S.
- Education: George Mason University (BA)
- Occupation: Political activist
- Years active: 2015–present
- Political party: Republican

Scott Ryan Presler (born May 15, 1988) is an American conservative activist. Briefly an organizer for the Republican Party of Virginia before the 2016 U.S. elections, Presler came to prominence as coordinator of the "March Against Sharia" events organized by anti-Muslim advocacy group ACT for America.

Presler was a participant, and sometimes a speaker or organizer, in the "Stop the Steal" protests promoting the false claim that widespread electoral fraud allowed former vice president Joe Biden to win the 2020 U.S. presidential election against incumbent Donald Trump.

== Early life ==
Scott Ryan Presler was born in Jacksonville, Florida, on May 15, 1988. The son of a United States Navy captain, Presler was raised in Florida and Fairfax County, Virginia, and had lived in Virginia Beach for around a year by 2016. Presler earned a degree in criminal justice from George Mason University. When interviewed by The Virginian-Pilot in 2016, Presler said that he had come out as gay in June that year following the shooting at the Pulse gay nightclub in Orlando, Florida, in which 49 people were killed.

== Career ==
=== 2016 U.S. elections ===
Presler was employed as a regional field director for the Republican Party of Virginia in 2015 and 2016. With other Trump supporters, Presler constructed a small political display in Virginia Beach that was featured in The Virginian-Pilot. He also attended Norfolk's PrideFest, an LGBT festival, later that year with Republican Party officials. Politico Playbook reported in January 2023 that, according to three of the publication's sources, Presler's work with the Republican Party of Virginia in 2016 ended in August after he "engaged in sexual activity inside a Virginia Beach office the RNC shared with the state party – and posted explicit pictures of the encounter on Craigslist."

Presler co-founded the LGBTQ coalition Gays for Trump, and was reported to be its chairman in 2017. Presler was present at the Gays for Trump DeploraBall held in Maryland after the inauguration of Trump as president on January 20, 2017, and led the Virginia branch of the nationwide March 4 Trump later that March.

=== ACT for America, 2017–2018 ===
In a 2017 Washington Post interview, Presler said he was motivated to become a volunteer for anti-Muslim advocacy group ACT for America that year after hearing its founder, Brigitte Gabriel, speak. He volunteered for ACT for America for three months.

In June 2017, Presler was reported to be the coordinator of the "March Against Sharia" events organized by ACT for America in various states, as part of the counter-jihad movement. According to the Southern Poverty Law Center, a nonprofit legal advocacy organization, the marches "attracted various factions of the radical right, including white nationalists, neo-Nazis and antigovernment extremists" that were all "united by anti-Muslim animus." Presler organized a local offshoot of the March Against Sharia in Portland, Oregon, that month, which he later cancelled, citing Portland mayor Ted Wheeler's request for the General Services Administration (GSA) to not issue a permit for Presler's event to occur at a park across from the Portland City Hall. A march on the same date in Seattle, Washington, was organized by Presler soon after.

Prior to the 2017 Virginia gubernatorial election, Republican Party candidate Ed Gillespie requested and received an endorsement from Presler, as Presler was at that time the vice chairman of the Virginia Beach Young Republicans and a volunteer for Gillespie's campaign. A spokesperson of Gillespie told The Washington Post that he was not aware of Presler's involvement with ACT for America; Gillespie's campaign did not denounce Presler's endorsement.

=== 2020 U.S. elections ===
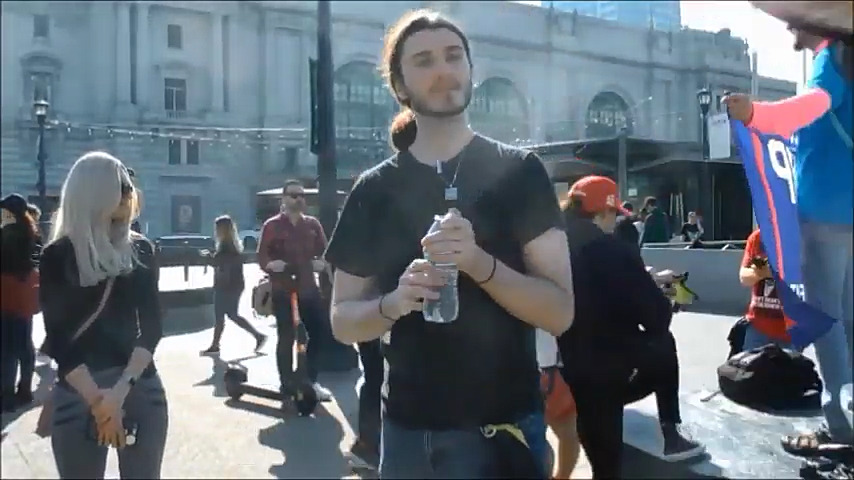
Presler in San Francisco in 2020

According to a 2021 report by Media Matters for America, a left-leaning media watchdog, Presler promoted the QAnon conspiracy theory and political movement by using hashtags in dozens of posts on Instagram in 2018 and 2019.

In April 2019, Presler held an activism workshop in the town of Kent, Connecticut, for the Connecticut Republican Party in preparation for the 2020 elections. A protest of Presler's event was organized by the Kent Democratic Town Committee after it failed to have his event canceled.

Presler organized a small clean-up event in Baltimore, Maryland, through social media the month after President Trump's tweets in July 2019 which described the congressional district represented by Democratic Party congressman Elijah Cummings as a "rodent infested mess". The event was attended by more than 100 volunteers and resulted in 29 tons of trash cleaned from streets. Another event in Los Angeles, California, organized by Presler involved dozens of volunteers. In December, Presler was advertised as appearing alongside activist Dylan Wheeler at an immigration-focused event in Bettendorf, Iowa, hosted by the Scott County Teenage Republicans; the event concluded with a speech by white supremacist political commentator Nick Fuentes.

In 2020, Presler continued to be involved in events in support of President Trump's re-election campaign. On November 5, 2020, two days after polls had closed but before the election's winner had been determined, Presler led a two-day "Stop the Steal" demonstration at the Pennsylvania State Capitol in Harrisburg attended by around 100 Trump supporters. A week after the victory of the Democratic Party candidate Joe Biden in the election, Presler was involved in a pro-Trump demonstration in downtown Washington, D.C. Later that month, he spoke at a "Stop the Steal" rally at the Georgia State Capitol.

Presler attended the "Save America" rally on January 6, 2021, that preceded the attack on the United States Capitol. Presler posted a video of himself near the Capitol that day in which he described the events that day as the "largest civil rights protest in American history."

=== Voter registration efforts and other political activities, 2021–2023 ===
Presler was a speaker at the 2021 Conservative Political Action Conference held in Orlando, Florida, in February 2021. According to 2023 reporting by Newsday, in May 2021, Presler became the brand ambassador for Rise NY PAC, a political action committee operated by the sister of New York congressional candidate George Santos following his unsuccessful run for Congress in 2020.

Presler was scheduled to appear at a Republican Party voter registration event in the town of Wilton, in Upstate New York, on August 25, 2021. The event was sponsored by the Saratoga County Republican Committee, and House Representative Elise Stefanik, who promoted Presler's appearance on Twitter. Stefanik and the county Republican Party were criticized by Democratic Party officials from her congressional district, who urged them to renounce Presler, but in response the Republican Party county chairman claimed the Democrats wanted to divert attention from their political failures. Stefanik later deleted her tweet and Presler ultimately canceled his appearance due to a Rise NY staff member contracting COVID-19.

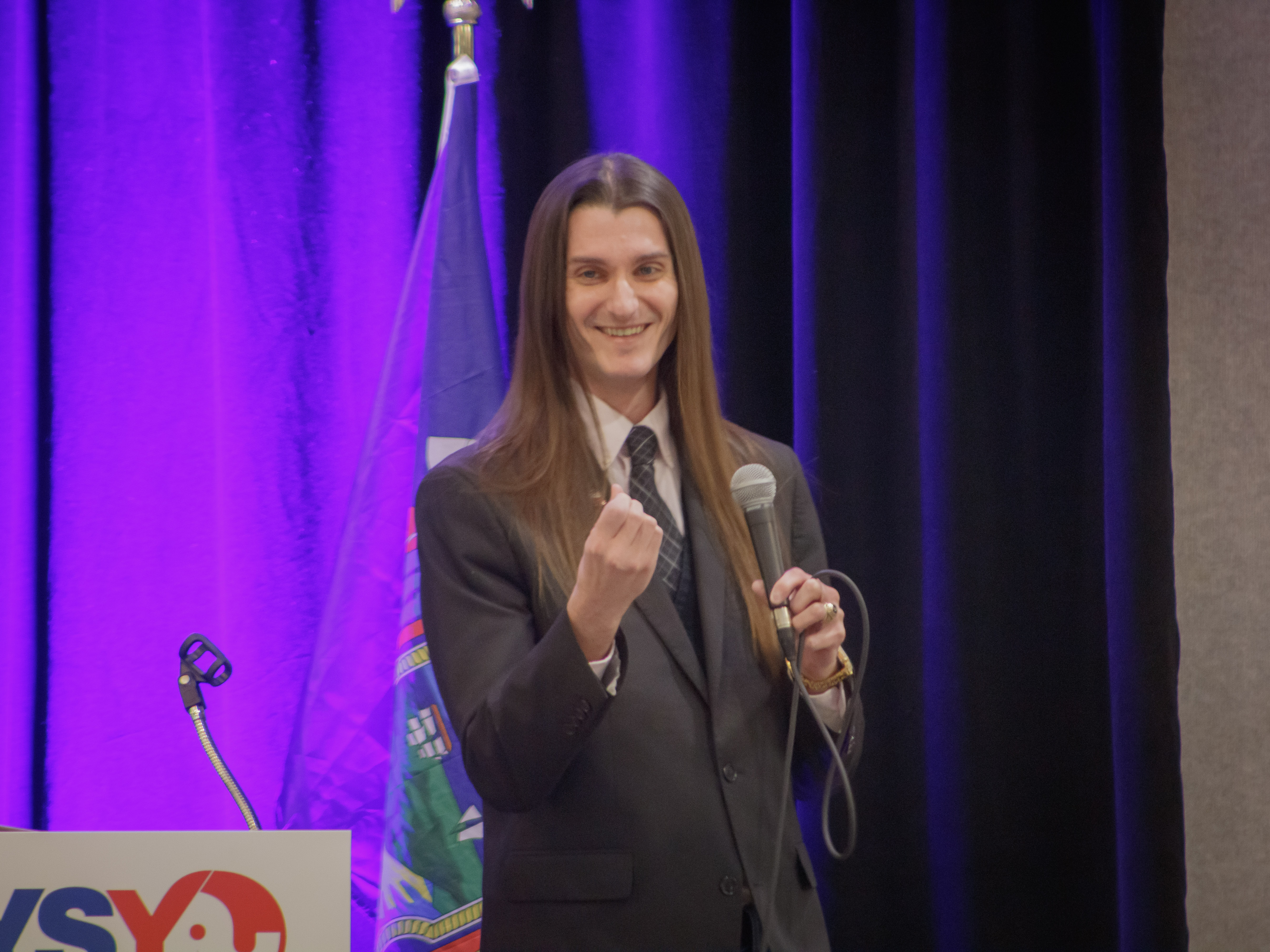
Presler speaking with the New York State Young Republicans in 2022

In December 2022, Presler was involved in get-out-the-vote efforts during the runoff election in the U.S. Senate election in Georgia. Later in December, Harmeet Dhillon, a lawyer and Republican National Committee (RNC) committee member, announced her candidacy in the 2023 RNC chairman election, challenging incumbent chair Ronna McDaniel. The day of her announcement, Dhillon said on Twitter that she would offer a job to Presler if she was elected. During the race, Presler published the email addresses and Twitter account names of RNC committee members on a website called "hireharmeet.com", which Dhillon shared on Twitter.

Prior to the Wisconsin Supreme Court election in April 2023, Presler traveled through Wisconsin and appeared on conservative talk radio shows to promote candidate Daniel Kelly, a former Wisconsin Supreme Court Justice. After posting a video on Twitter of himself standing alongside Presler, Kelly was questioned by press on Presler's presence at the United States Capitol on the day of the Capitol attack, to which Kelly responded that he was not aware of Presler's previous activities.

=== 2024 U.S. elections ===
Presler runs a non-profit organization, Early Vote Action, intended to "organize & mobilize Republicans to vote early." Shortly after her installation as Republican National Committee co-chair, Lara Trump, Donald Trump's daughter-in-law, expressed her interest to hire Presler to lead the Republican Party's "legal ballot harvesting" efforts. The RNC later clarified it would not be hiring Presler.

In the 2024 United States presidential election, Presler worked on encouraging voters to vote for Donald Trump in the swing state of Pennsylvania, including some Amish communities. He cited the local case of an Amish farmer whose dairy was raided by state authorities for selling unpasteurized milk without a permit; the raid preceded reports that two children had fallen sick due to E. coli poisoning connected to the farmer's milk. He threatened to sue Luzerne County at a county meeting over claims of a voter registration and mail-in ballot application backlog, but did not ultimately file a lawsuit. He leveled similar accusations during appearances on right-wing media, notably the War Room podcast hosted by political operative Steve Bannon.

In early 2025, after Presler's efforts to ensure a Republican victory in an election to the Wisconsin Supreme Court failed, fellow gay pro-Trump activist and former friend Brandon Straka, who founded the WalkAway campaign, started a website with other conservatives, that criticized Presler as largely a beneficiary of media hype he orchestrated. They observed that the Amish vote was relatively inconsequential to the outcome in Pennsylvania. In Lancaster County, where most of the state's Amish population is concentrated, they noted, the total vote for Trump increased by only 6,000 over the 2020 election. He also carried the county in that election, even when it had more registered Democrats. Presler's critics also faulted him for not correcting a claim by his supporters that he had registered 180,000 Amish, since there are only 100,000 in the state.

=== 2025 elections ===
Presler and his PAC Early Vote Action campaigned against retaining three judges in the 2025 Pennsylvania Supreme Court election. Had the judges not been retained, it would have opened up their seats for replacement by judges more-preferred by Republicans. Presler told reporters he had hired 25 staffers for the campaign, which "barnstormed" the state at county fairs and gun shows, sent 100,000 text messages, and ran advertising.

=== Alleged violations of election and lobbying laws ===
Public Citizen alleged that in its 2025 Pennsylvania judicial election campaign Presler and Early Vote Action failed to register with the state and failed to report contributions or expenditures as required by Pennsylvania law. Campaign committees which spend more than $250 must register and report their expenses. Contributors of over $50 must also be reported. An earlier complaint from the same organization alleged failure to register and disclose lobbying activities, required under federal law, when lobbying for the SAVE Act. A representative from Public Citizen stated Presler has "a history of not registering and disclosing his expenditures in politics altogether".

In 2026 The Bulwark reported that in 2024 three campaign operatives from other locales had registered and voted using Presler's residence address. It alleged these temporary visitors had failed to establish residency as required by Pennsylvania election law.

== Views ==
=== LGBT rights ===
In a 2016 interview by The Virginian-Pilot, Presler said he was not put off by the Republican Party's positions on gay rights despite being a gay man. Presler further explained that he was supporting Trump's 2016 presidential campaign over Hillary Clinton partly because of the Second Amendment: "I 100 percent believe in the notion that armed gays don't get bashed. It is our right to feel safe."

Presler expressed disagreement with President Trump's 2017 Presidential Memorandum on Military Service by Transgender Individuals, which prohibited open military service and enlistment of transgender Americans. Presler added, "'Generals know more about war than I do. I am cognisant that they understand what it takes to go to war... I don't think this is an attack on the LGBT community... I'm mixed, but I have confidence in the guidance that President Trump is receiving. I don't think for a second he's prejudiced.'"

Presler voiced his support for the Florida Parental Rights in Education Act, commonly referred to as the "Don't Say Gay" law, signed into law by state governor Ron DeSantis in 2022.

=== Islam ===
In 2017, while employed by anti-Muslim advocacy group ACT for America, Presler said in an NPR interview that he felt inspired to oppose "Muslim extremism" after the 2016 shooting at the Pulse gay nightclub in Orlando. Because the shooter allegedly swore allegiance to the Islamic State of Iraq and Syria, Presler said he felt the shooting exemplified homophobia in what he termed as "orthodox Islam". Presler also told The Washington Post that he disagreed with the Southern Poverty Law Center's claims that ACT for America is an extremist group and the "largest grass-roots anti-Muslim group in America", insisting that ACT for America intends to help girls and women affected by Sharia (Islamic law).
