= 1976 Massachusetts Question 1 =

Referendum protecting equal rights

- 2 November 1976
- Do you approve of the adoption of an amendment to the Constitution summarized below, which was approved by the General Court in joint sessions of the House of Representatives and Senate on August 15, 1973, by a vote of 261-0, and on May 14, 1975, by a vote of 217-55? The proposed amendment would provide that equality under the law may not be denied or abridged on the basis of sex, race, color, creed or national origin. This amendment adds one sentence to Article I of Part the First of the Constitution which now contains a general statement of individual rights, including the right to enjoy and defend life and liberty and the right to acquire and protect property.

Results
Choice	Votes	%
Yes	1,445,066	60.44%
No	945,789	39.56%

Yes
50-60%
60-70%
70-80%
80-90%
90-100%
No
50-60%

1976 Massachusetts Question 1 was a proposed amendment to the Constitution of Massachusetts to provide that equality of rights under the law cannot be denied or abridged on the basis of sex, race, color, creed, or national origin. The amendment passed, receiving 60.44% of the vote, and the backing of all 14 counties.

== Background ==
The amendment was on the ballot as the federal Equal Rights Amendment was being debated.

The resolution that placed the measure on the ballot was approved in joint sessions by the General Court on August 15, 1973, and on May 14, 1975. In 1973, the vote was 261 to 0, and in 1975, the vote was 217 to 55.

== Viewpoints ==
=== Politicians ===
Representative Margaret Heckler supported the measure, and believed that the passage "would rejuvenate" the national movement for the federal Equal Rights Amendment. Heckler, noting that similar amendments had previously failed in New York and New Jersey, believed that in those states, "proponents thought the case for an Equal Rights Amendment was so strong and so persuasive that they didn't have to articulate it. We learned from their mistakes. We brought the debate out into the open."

Governor Michael Dukakis, after the amendment passed, said, "I feel good, but my wife feels very good. They [other states] are always looking at Massachusetts as an unusual place. Maybe this time they will follow us."

=== Editorials ===
The Boston Globe believed that the amendment should pass, saying, "The rights of citizens are often jeopardized by one force or another in society. The job of the law is to guarantee equal protection by what is written in the statues and by what is determined in court. The proposed amendment makes explicit society's commitment to this notion, and it merits a yes vote."

The Valley Advocate supported a "yes" vote on Question 1, and denied the truthfulness of claims of the opposition, saying, "Contrary to popular opinion, the following areas have nothing to do with the state ERA: abortion, banking and insurance, public restrooms, private education, family life, religion, homosexual marriage, Social Security, and federal military service. Vote YES on Question 1."

The Daily Hampshire Gazette backed the amendment, saying, "While we believe the amendment is more a symbolic proposal than a need to provide a new legal ban against discrimination we believe our state should be devoted in word as well as fact to the historic concept of equal protection for all Americans. We recommend a Yes vote."

== Pre-election polling ==
A poll conducted on 223 students at the University of Massachusetts found 88% support for the amendment.

At Monument Mountain Regional High School, a poll conducted on 418 students, or 58 percent of the student body, resulted in 351 yes votes, and 84 no votes.

== Results ==
County	Yes		No	
County	#	%	#	%
Barnstable	48,298	68.86	21,844	31.14
Berkshire	38,089	59.75	25,658	40.25
Bristol	113,503	65.32	60,269	34.68
Dukes	3,772	79.36	981	20.64
Essex	167,201	58.68	117,740	41.32
Franklin	19,272	64.64	10,541	35.36
Hampden	102,892	58.92	71,727	41.08
Hampshire	39,491	68.20	18,417	31.80
Middlesex	373,797	60.98	239,143	39.02
Nantucket	1,813	75.17	599	24.83
Norfolk	168,125	57.73	123,084	42.27
Plymouth	83,247	52.45	75,457	47.55
Suffolk	112,008	55.66	89,235	44.34
Worcester	173,558	65.58	91,094	34.42
State total	1,445,066	60.44	945,789	39.56

== See also ==
- State equal rights amendments
