= State equal rights amendments =

Provide various degrees of legal protection against discrimination

States whose constitutions contain equal rights provisions amendment has passed one of two houses of the legislature amendment has been sent by the legislature to an upcoming referendum

In the United States, states have passed state equal rights amendments (ERAs) to their constitutions that provide various degrees of legal protection against discrimination based on sex. With some mirroring the broad language and guarantees of the proposed Federal Equal Rights Amendment, others more closely resemble the Equal Protection Clause of the Fourteenth Amendment.

The standard of review that a court applies in evaluating a discriminatory claim mandates the level of protection guaranteed, ranging from the most rigorous strict scrutiny, intermediate standard or the least-stringent rational basis review. Courts reflect on the unique legislative history and development, intent, status of public policy and related precedent in deciding the scope of legal safeguards afforded to sex discrimination, resulting in differences between state and federal jurisprudence.

A Supreme Court decision found that sex discrimination claims under the Fourteenth Amendment's Equal Protection Clause are reviewed under the middle-tier intermediate scrutiny, based on the formal equality analysis of federal precedent. While some state courts have adopted this reading of their own equality provisions, most others with equal rights or equal protection language have regarded these clauses as requiring strict scrutiny.

== Expanded state protection ==
While around twenty states have ruled provisions in their state constitutions expand the protection guaranteed to sex discrimination, some have read their ERAs to mandate a nearly absolutist approach or to apply strict scrutiny. Certain aspects frequently conflicting with federal protection are questions of facially-neutral laws and disparate impact, state action, whether sex is deemed a suspect classification, and different treatment because of unique biological traits.

For example, states such as Pennsylvania, Colorado, Washington, Maryland and Massachusetts have some of the most stringent protection, their courts ruling the main intent of the ERA was to abolish using sex to make legal distinctions and allocate benefits. Others, such as New Mexico, have a complete prohibition against using classifications involving a physical trait unique to either sex or result in disadvantaging either women or men.

=== State vs. private action ===
Fourteenth Amendment guarantees are only applied to the actions executed by state actors, and does not cover purely private discriminatory actions. Many states have interpreted their ERAs as prohibiting sex discrimination performed by private entities as well as state actors, extending the scope of protection.

=== Disparate impact ===
Courts treat a challenged action differently if it is sex-neutral, or contains no explicit use of sex classifications, but results in adverse impact disproportionately burdening one sex more harshly than the other. As ruled in Village of Arlington Heights v. Metropolitan Housing Development Corp., federal jurisprudence refuses to apply the more protective intermediate scrutiny to gender-neutral acts without direct proof sex discrimination is the purpose of the act. In contrast, some state courts have interpreted their ERAs to even protect against sex-neutral acts that have a disproportionate adverse impact on one gender by applying a heightened standard of review.

== States adopting federal model of equalities ==
Fewer states have interpreted their ERAs as mandating a degree of protection more closely resembling the federal guarantees against sex discrimination. For example, Virginia, Rhode Island, Florida and Utah courts have ruled their constitutions only mandate an intermediate standard of review, mirroring the Equal Protection Clause analysis.

In concluding the constitution's equality protection is not a "true ERA," the Rhode Island courts have accepted this middle-tier scrutiny, citing the unique history and intent of the legislature as justification."

== List of state constitutions containing ERAs ==
State equal rights amendments and original constitutional equal rights provisions:

- Alaska – No person is to be denied the enjoyment of any civil or political right because of race, color, creed, sex or national origin. The legislature shall implement this section. Alaska Constitution, Article I, §3 (1972)
- California – A person may not be disqualified from entering or pursuing a business, profession, vocation, or employment because of sex, race, creed, color, or national or ethnic origin. California Constitution, Article I, §8 (1879)
- Colorado – Equality of rights under the law shall not be denied or abridged by the state of Colorado or any of its political subdivisions because of sex. Colorado Constitution, Article II, §29 (1973)
- Connecticut - No person shall be denied the equal protection of the law nor be subjected to segregation or discrimination in the exercise or enjoyment of his or her civil or political rights because of religion, race, color, ancestry, national origin, sex or physical or mental disability. Connecticut Constitution, Article I, §20 (1974)
- Delaware - Equality of rights under the law shall not be denied or abridged on account of race, color, national origin, or sex. Delaware Constitution, Article I, §21 (2019, 2021)
- Florida - Basic rights. All natural persons, female and male alike, are equal before the law and have inalienable rights, among which are the right to enjoy and defend life and liberty, to pursue happiness, to be rewarded for industry, and to acquire, possess and protect property; except that the ownership, inheritance, disposition and possession of real property by aliens ineligible for citizenship may be regulated or prohibited by law. No person shall be deprived of any right because of race, religion, national origin, or physical disability. Florida Constitution, Article I, §2 (1998)
- Hawaii - Equality of rights under the law shall not be denied or abridged by the State on account of sex. The legislature shall have the power to enforce, by appropriate legislation, the provisions of this section. Hawaii Constitution, Article I, §3 (1978)
- Illinois - The equal protection of the laws shall not be denied or abridged on account of sex by the State or its units of local government and school districts. Illinois Constitution, Article I, §18 (1970)
- Indiana - The General Assembly shall not grant to any citizen, or class of citizens, privileges or immunities, which, upon the same terms, shall not equally belong to all citizens. Indiana Constitution, Article 1, §23 (2018)
- Iowa – All men and women are, by nature, free and equal and have certain inalienable rights—among which are those of enjoying and defending life and liberty, acquiring, possessing and protecting property, and pursuing and obtaining safety and happiness. Iowa Constitution, Article I, §1 (1998)
- Louisiana - No person shall be denied the equal protection of the laws. No law shall discriminate against a person because of race or religious ideas, beliefs, or affiliations. No law shall arbitrarily, capriciously, or unreasonably discriminate against a person because of birth, age, sex, culture, physical condition, or political ideas or affiliations. Slavery and involuntary servitude are prohibited, except in the latter case as punishment for crime. Louisiana Constitution, Article I, §3 (1975)
- Maryland – Equality of rights under the law shall not be abridged or denied because of sex. Maryland Constitution, Declaration of Rights, Article 46 (1972)
- Massachusetts - All people are born free and equal, and have certain natural, essential, and unalienable rights; among which may be reckoned the right of enjoying and defending their lives and liberties; that of acquiring, possessing and protecting property; in fine, that of seeking and obtaining their safety and happiness. Equality under the law shall not be denied or abridged because of sex, race, color, creed or national origin. Massachusetts Constitution, Part 1, Article 1 (1976)
- Montana – Individual dignity. The dignity of the human being is inviolable. No person shall be denied the equal protection of the laws. Neither the state nor any person, firm, corporation, or institution shall discriminate against any person in the exercise of his civil or political rights on account of race, color, sex, culture, social origin or condition, or political or religious ideas. Montana Constitution, Article II, §4 (1973)
- Nebraska - (1) The state shall not discriminate against, or grant preferential treatment to, any individual or group on the basis of race, sex, color, ethnicity, or national origin in the operation of public employment, public education, or public contracting.[....] (3) Nothing in this section prohibits bona fide qualifications based on sex that are reasonably necessary to the normal operation of public employment, public education, or public contracting. Nebraska Constitution, Article I, §30 (2008)
- Nevada - Equality of rights under the law shall not be denied or abridged by this State or any of its political subdivisions on account of race, color, creed, sex, sexual orientation, gender identity or expression, age, disability, ancestry or national origin. Nevada Constitution, Article 1, Section 24 (2022)
- New Hampshire - [Natural Rights.] All men have certain natural, essential, and inherent rights - among which are, the enjoying and defending life and liberty; acquiring, possessing, and protecting, property; and, in a word, of seeking and obtaining happiness. Equality of rights under the law shall not be denied or abridged by this state on account of race, creed, color, sex or national origin. New Hampshire Constitution, Part First, Article 2 (1974)
- New Jersey - Wherever in this Constitution the term "person", "persons", "people" or any personal pronoun is used, the same shall be taken to include both sexes. New Jersey Constitution, Article X, paragraph 4 (1947)
- New Mexico - No person shall be deprived of life, liberty or property without due process of law; nor shall any person be denied equal protection of the laws. Equality of rights under law shall not be denied on account of the sex of any person. New Mexico Constitution, Article II, §18 (1973)
- New York -
  - a. No person shall be denied the equal protection of the laws of this state or any subdivision thereof. No person shall, because of race, color, ethnicity, national origin, age, disability, creed [or], religion, or sex, including sexual orientation, gender identity, gender expression, pregnancy, pregnancy outcomes, and reproductive healthcare and autonomy, be subjected to any discrimination in [his or her] their civil rights by any other person or by any firm, corporation, or institution, or by the state or any agency or subdivision of the state, pursuant to law.
  - b. Nothing in this section shall invalidate or prevent the adoption of any law, regulation, program, or practice that is designed to prevent or dismantle discrimination on the basis of a characteristic listed in this section, nor shall any characteristic listed in this section be interpreted to interfere with, limit, or deny the civil rights of any person based upon any other characteristic identified in this section. New York Constitution, Article 1, §11 (2024)
- Oregon - Equality of rights under the law shall not be denied or abridged by the state of Oregon or by any political subdivision in this state on account of sex. Oregon Constitution, Article I, §46 (2014)
- Pennsylvania:
  - - Equality of rights under the law shall not be denied or abridged in the Commonwealth of Pennsylvania because of the sex of the individual. Pennsylvania Constitution, Article I, § 28 (1971)
  - - Equality of rights under the law shall not be denied or abridged in the Commonwealth of Pennsylvania because of the race or ethnicity of the individual. Pennsylvania Constitution, Article I, § 29 (2021)
- Rhode Island - No person shall be deprived of life, liberty or property without due process of law, nor shall any person be denied equal protection of the laws. No otherwise qualified person shall, solely by reason of race, gender or handicap be subject to discrimination by the state, its agents or any person or entity doing business with the state. Nothing in this section shall be construed to grant or secure any right relating to abortion or the funding thereof. Rhode Island Constitution, Article I, §2 (1986)
- Texas - Equality under the law shall not be denied or abridged because of sex, race, color, creed, or national origin. This amendment is self-operative. Texas Constitution, Article I, §3a (1972)
- Utah – The rights of citizens of the State of Utah to vote and hold office shall not be denied or abridged on account of sex. Both male and female citizens of this State shall enjoy all civil, political and religious rights and privileges. Utah Constitution, Article IV, §1 (1896)
- Virginia - That no person shall be deprived of his life, liberty, or property without due process of law; that the General Assembly shall not pass any law impairing the obligation of contracts; and that the right to be free from any governmental discrimination upon the basis of religious conviction, race, color, sex, or national origin shall not be abridged, except that the mere separation of the sexes shall not be considered discrimination. Virginia Constitution, Article I, §11 (1971)
- Washington - Equality of rights and responsibility under the law shall not be denied or abridged on account of sex. Washington Constitution, ARTICLE XXXI, §1 (1972)
- Wyoming – In their inherent right to life, liberty and the pursuit of happiness, all members of the human race are equal. Since equality in the enjoyment of natural and civil rights is only made sure through political equality, the laws of this state affecting the political rights and privileges of its citizens shall be without distinction of race, color, sex, or any circumstance or condition whatsoever other than the individual incompetency or unworthiness duly ascertained by a court of competent jurisdiction. The rights of citizens of the state of Wyoming to vote and hold office shall not be denied or abridged on account of sex. Both male and female citizens of this state shall equally enjoy all civil, political and religious rights and privileges. Wyoming Constitution, Articles I and VI (1890)

=== Table of protected classes ===
State	race	color	sex	national origin	creed	other	Note	Means of passage
Alabama	No	No	No	No	No			
Alaska	Yes	Yes	Yes	Yes	Yes			
Arkansas								
Arizona							"in the operation of public employment, public education or public contracting"	
California	Yes	Yes	Yes	Yes	Yes		"entering or pursuing a business, profession, vocation, or employment"	
Colorado			Yes					
Connecticut	Yes	Yes	Yes	Yes		"religion", "ancestry"		
Delaware	Yes	Yes	Yes	Yes				
Florida	Yes		Yes	Yes		"religion", "physical disability"		
Georgia								
Hawaii	Yes		Yes			"religion", "ancestry"		
Illinois							"in the hiring and promotion practices of any employer or in the sale or rental of property"	
Indiana								
Iowa								
Louisiana	Yes		Yes			"birth, age", "physical condition, or political ideas or affiliations"		
Maryland			Yes					
Massachusetts	Yes	Yes	Yes	Yes	Yes			1976 Massachusetts Question 1
Montana	Yes	Yes	Yes			"culture, social origin or condition, or political or religious ideas"		
Nebraska	Yes	Yes	Yes	Yes				
Nevada	Yes	Yes	Yes	Yes	Yes	"sexual orientation, gender identity or expression, age, disability, ancestry"		Ratified by the voters in 2022.
New Hampshire	Yes	Yes	Yes	Yes	Yes			
New Jersey							A proposed amendment (1975 New Jersey Public Question 2) would have explicitly provided that equality of rights under the law cannot be denied or abridged on account of sex, but the amendment failed. However, Article X, paragraph 4 of the New Jersey Constitution provides that any term related to "person" in the constitution must be interpreted to include both sexes.	
New Mexico			Yes					
New York	Yes	Yes	Yes	Yes	Yes	"ethnicity, national origin, age, disability, creed [or], religion, or sex, including their sexual orientation, gender identity, gender expression, pregnancy, pregnancy outcomes, and reproductive healthcare and autonomy"	"Nothing in this section shall invalidate or prevent the adoption of any law, regulation, program, or practice that is designed to prevent or dismantle discrimination on the basis of a characteristic listed in this section, nor shall any characteristic listed in this section be interpreted to interfere with, limit, or deny the civil rights of any person based upon any other characteristic identified in this section."	Passed by the New York State Legislature on July 1, 2022, passed again on January 24, 2023. Ratified by ballot measure November 5, 2024.
Oregon			Yes					2014 Oregon Ballot Measure 89
Pennsylvania	Yes		Yes					1971 Pennsylvania Amendment 2, 2021 Pennsylvania Amendment 3, and 1967 Pennsylvania Amendment 1-A
Rhode Island	Yes					"gender, handicap"		
Texas	Yes	Yes	Yes	Yes	Yes			
Utah			Yes					
Virginia	Yes	Yes	Yes	Yes				
Washington			Yes					
Wisconsin								
Wyoming	Yes	Yes	Yes					

== Intersections with other constitutional protections ==
- California, Colorado, Maryland, Nevada and New York are the states which have passed amendments which protect both against discrimination on the basis of sex as well as against infringement of abortion access.
- California, Colorado and Nevada are the states which have passed amendments which protect both against discrimination on the basis of sex as well as the right to marriage regardless of sex.

== States where state-level ERAs have passed at least one house ==
- Maine: A state-level ERA passed the Maine House of Representatives on February 15, 2022.
- Minnesota: A state-level ERA passed the Minnesota House of Representatives on March 7, 2019.
