= Bernard O'Brien =

Bernard O'Brien may refer to:

- Bernard O'Brien (Jesuit) (1907–1982), New Zealand Jesuit priest
- Bernard O'Brien (microsurgeon) (1924–1993), Australian microsurgeon
- Bernard O'Brien (politician) (1914–2011), American politician from Pennsylvania
- Skip O'Brien (Bernard Francis O'Brien, 1950–2011), American actor
