= List of programs broadcast by Middle East Television =

This is a list of programs currently, formerly, and soon to be broadcast by Middle East Television (METV).

== Currently broadcast by METV ==
- The 700 Club
- Another Life
- Turning Point
- The Flying House
- The Beverly Hillbillies
- New Beginnings
- NFL football
- Prophetic Convergence
- The Dick Van Dyke Show
- Sid Roth's It's Supernatural!
- Superbook
- The Lucy Show

== Formerly broadcast by METV ==
=== Cartoons ===
- The Adventures of Don Coyote and Sancho Panda
- The Adventures of Tintin
- Alfred J. Kwak
- Alvin & the Chipmunks
- Around the World with Willy Fog
- The Atom Ant/Secret Squirrel Show
- Blaze and the Monster Machines
- Bionic Six
- Blake and Mortimer
- The Busy World of Richard Scarry
- Captain Caveman and the Teen Angels
- Care Bears
- Danger Mouse
- Dennis the Menace
- Diplodos
- Fables of the Green Forest
- Fat Albert and the Cosby Kids
- The Flintstones
- The Get Along Gang
- GoldRake
- Harlem Globetrotters
- The Incredible Hulk
- Inspector Gadget
- The Jetsons
- JOT
- Laurel and Hardy
- Little Audrey
- Mighty Mouse
- Mort and Phil
- Muppet Babies
- The New Adventures Of Gilligan
- The All New Popeye Show
- The New 3 Stooges
- Captain Red Beard
- The Rocky and Bullwinkle Show
- Scooby-Doo, Where Are You!
- Snagglepuss
- Sonic the Hedgehog
- Spider-Man
- Spider-Man and His Amazing Friends
- Spider-Woman
- Spiral Zone
- The Super Globetrotters
- SuperTed
- Swiss Family Robinson
- Tom and Jerry
- Top Cat
- Touché Turtle and Dum Dum
- Wacky Races
- Wish Kid
- Woody Woodpecker
- Yogi Bear

=== Children's shows ===
- Animals, Animals, Animals
- Beakman's World
- Fraggle Rock
- Gerbert
- Gina D's Kids Club
- The Gospel Bill Show
- McGee and Me!
- Poppets Town
- VeggieTales
- Wishbone
- Worzel Gummidge

=== TV series ===
- 21 Jump Street
- The A-Team
- Airwolf
- Battlestar Galactica (1978)
- Bonanza
- Bordertown
- Buck Rogers in the 25th Century
- Cagney & Lacey
- The Campbells
- C.A.T.S. Eyes
- Code 3
- The Commish
- Death Valley Days
- Duck Dynasty
- The Equalizer
- The Fall Guy
- Father Murphy
- Galactica 1980
- The Greatest American Hero
- Gunsmoke
- Hardcastle and McCormick
- Hart to Hart
- Hawaii Five-O
- The High Chaparral
- Highway to Heaven
- Hunter
- I Spy
- If Tomorrow Comes
- Jake and the Fatman
- Lassie
- Law & Order
- Little House on the Prairie
- The Lone Ranger
- Lost in Space
- Magnum, P.I.
- Matlock
- Moon Over Miami
- Moonlighting
- Murder, She Wrote
- The Paper Chase
- Patrol Boat
- Quantum Leap
- Outlaws
- Rawhide
- Remington Steele
- The Rifleman
- The Roy Rogers Show
- Scarecrow and Mrs. King
- SeaQuest DSV
- Simon & Simon
- Star Trek: The Original Series
- Star Trek: The Next Generation
- Tour of Duty
- Trapper John, M.D.
- Touched by an Angel
- Walker, Texas Ranger
- The Waltons
- Wiseguy
- The Young Riders
- Zorro

=== Sitcoms ===
- The Andy Griffith Show
- The Beverly Hillbillies
- The Bob Morrison Show
- The Bob Newhart Show
- Boy Meets World
- Coach
- Cosby
- The Cosby Show
- Day by Day
- The Dick Van Dyke Show
- Doc
- F Troop
- The Facts of Life
- Family Ties
- Full House
- Gilligan's Island
- The Golden Girls
- Happy Days
- Home Improvement
- I Dream of Jeannie
- The Jeffersons
- Kate & Allie
- Laverne & Shirley
- The Lucy Show
- Major Dad
- Marblehead Manor
- Martin
- The Mary Tyler Moore Show
- M*A*S*H
- Moesha
- Mork & Mindy
- Newhart
- The Odd Couple
- Perfect Strangers
- Punky Brewster
- The Red Green Show
- Remington Steele
- Saved by the Bell
- Webster
- Welcome Back, Kotter
- Wings
- WKRP in Cincinnati

=== Entertainment shows ===
- Amazing Discoveries with Mike Levey
- America's Funniest Home Videos
- The Muppet Show

=== Sports ===
- WWF

=== Religion ===
- Hour of Power
- Shape Up with Nancy Larson
- The Harvest Show
- Don't Ask Me, Ask God

=== Documentary ===
- Rescue 911

=== News ===
- 60 Minutes
- METV World News
