= Brigitte Gabriel =

Lebanese-American activist (born 1964)

- بريجيت غابرييل
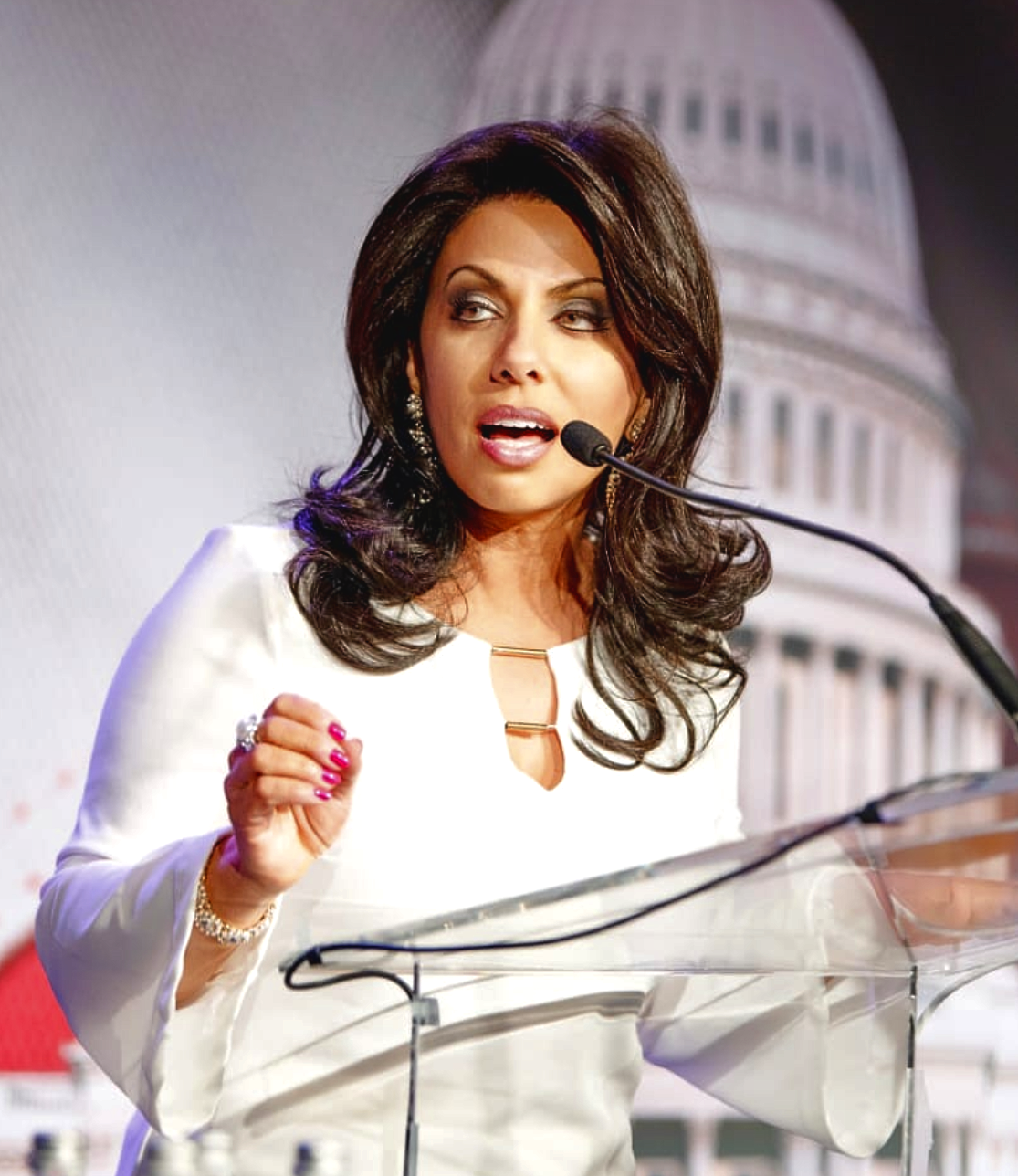
- Brigitte Gabriel
- Born: Hanan Qahwaji; October 21, 1964 (age 61); Marjayoun, Lebanon
- Other name: Nour Semaan (pen name)
- Citizenship: United States
- Occupations: Activist; author; journalist; lecturer
- Organization: ACT for America
- Spouse: Charles Tudor (m. 1989)
- Website: actforamerica.org

Brigitte Gabriel (Arabic: بريجيت غابرييل; born Hanan Qahwaji, 21 October 1964) is a Lebanese-American conservative activist, author and lecturer, and critic of Islam. She is the founder of ACT for America, an advocacy group that opposes Islamic extremism. Before emigrating to the United States in 1989, she was a news anchor for World News on Middle East Television.

== Early life ==
Gabriel was born on 21 October 1964 to a family of Maronite Christians in the Marjeyoun District of Lebanon. During the Lebanese Civil War, militants launched an assault on a Lebanese military base nearby which destroyed her home. Gabriel, who was ten years old at the time, suffered shrapnel injuries in the attack. For the next seven years, she and her parents were forced to live underground in an 8-by-10-foot (2.4 by 3.0 m) bomb shelter with only a small kerosene heater, no sanitary systems, no electricity or running water, and little food. Gabriel claims she had to crawl in a roadside ditch to evade snipers on her way to collect water from a nearby spring.

In the spring of 1978, a bomb explosion caused Gabriel and her parents to become trapped in their shelter for two days. They were eventually rescued by three Christian militiamen, one of whom had befriended Gabriel before being killed by a landmine.

Gabriel wrote that in 1978, a stranger warned her family of an impending attack on the Christian populace in her area. However, the attack was thwarted by the Israeli invasion of Lebanon. Later, her mother was seriously injured in an attack and subsequently taken for treatment at a hospital in Israel. During this period, Gabriel's views on the Israelis changed as she began to question anti-Israel propaganda she said she had witnessed as a child.

The facts surrounding Gabriel's upbringing and claims made in her autobiography have been widely disputed, with American author Dave Gaubatz calling her account of growing up in Lebanon as "dramatically fabricated.”

After graduating from high school, Gabriel completed a one-year course in business administration at a YWCA in 1984.

== Career ==
Using the pseudonym Nour Semaan, Gabriel was a news anchor for World News, an Arabic-language evening news broadcast of Middle East Television. According to Laurie Goodstein of The New York Times, the network "was then run by Pat Robertson's Christian Broadcasting Network to spread his politically conservative, Pentecostal faith in the Middle East." The broadcasts covered Israel, Egypt, Syria, Jordan, and Lebanon. Gabriel reported on the withdrawal of Israeli troops from central Lebanon and the "Security Zone" in southern Lebanon, as well as the First Palestinian Intifada. She then moved to Israel before emigrating to the United States in 1989.

Gabriel wrote the books Because They Hate in 2006 and They Must Be Stopped in 2008, which sold a combined 120,000 copies in print, with the former reaching number 12 on The New York Times Best Seller list for political books.

In February 2017, Gabriel said that she provided a "national security briefing" at the White House. She met with aides at the White House in March 2017, during the first Donald Trump administration. She has written for Breitbart News.

=== ACT for America ===
Gabriel founded the advocacy group "ACT for America" in 2007. It has been described as anti-Muslim. According to The New York Times, ACT for America draws "on three rather religious and partisan streams in American politics: evangelical Christian conservatives, hard-line defenders of Israel (both Jews and Christians) and Tea Party Republicans". According to The Washington Post, the organization "touted as its 'first accomplishment' its 2008 campaign to shut down a Minnesota Islamic school."

The Southern Poverty Law Center described ACT! for America as "the largest grassroots anti-Muslim group in the country," and the Council on American–Islamic Relations has described it as "one of the main sources of growing anti-Muslim bigotry in our nation". According to The Guardian, the organization has been "widely identified as anti-Muslim". Gabriel and ACT! have been described as part of the counter-jihad movement.

According to Peter Beinart in The Atlantic, "the organization has condemned cities with large Muslim populations for serving halal food in public schools. In 2013, its Houston chapter urged members to 'protest' food companies that certify their meat as compliant with Islamic dietary law. ACT! for America tries to dissuade Jews and Christians from conducting interfaith dialogue with Muslims. And in state after state, it has lobbied state legislatures and school boards to purge textbooks of references that create 'an inaccurate comparison between Islam, Christianity and Judaism.'"

== Views ==
According to Laurie Goodstein of The New York Times, Gabriel "presents a portrait of Islam so thoroughly bent on destruction and domination that it is unrecognizable to those who study or practice the religion." Goodstein says that Gabriel "insists that she is singling out only 'radical Islam' or Muslim 'extremists'—not the vast majority of Muslims or their faith. And yet, in her speeches and her two books, she leaves the opposite impression."

BuzzFeed News described her as "the most influential leader in America's increasingly influential anti-Islam lobby." The Washington Post describes her two books as "alarmist tracts about Islam." Beinart described her as "America's most prominent anti-Muslim activist."

Stephen Lee, a publicist at St. Martin's Press for Gabriel's second book, has called her views "extreme," and Deborah Solomon of The New York Times Magazine, who interviewed Gabriel in August 2008, described her as a "radical Islamophobe". According to Clark Hoyt from The New York Times, over 250 people wrote in to protest that label in the days that followed. Hussein Ibish, a Senior Resident Scholar at The Arab Gulf States Institute in Washington, said that her "agenda is pure unadulterated hatred" and that she has "a pathological hatred of Muslims and other Arabs". Gabriel disputes the charge, saying that "I have no quarrel with Muslims who wish to practice the spiritual tenets of their religion in peace".

=== Opinions on Islam ===
In 2009, Gabriel said that there is a "cancer called Islamofascism" that permeates a Muslim world in which "extreme is mainstream". In June 2014, Gabriel said that "The radicals are estimated to be between 15 to 25 percent" worldwide. In an interview with The Australian Jewish News, she stated that "A practising Muslim who upholds the tenets of the Koran—it's not that simple—a practising Muslim who goes to mosque every Friday, prays five times a day, and who believes that the Koran is the word of God, and who believes that Mohammed is the perfect man and [four inaudible words] is a radical Muslim."

When Gabriel was invited to speak as part of a lecture series organized by Duke University's Jewish community in October 2004, many in attendance were angered by her referring to Arabs as "barbarians." The Freeman Centre for Jewish Life at Duke University later apologized for her comments. Following her speech at a women's campaign event for the Jewish Federation of Ottawa (JFO) in November 2008, many in attendance registered their protests, leading Mitchell Bellman, president and CEO of the JFO, to write a letter in which he acknowledged that Gabriel made "unacceptable gross generalizations of Arabs and Muslims," distancing his organization from her views.

In 2007 at the Christians United for Israel annual conference, Gabriel delivered a speech that included the following:

The difference, my friends, between Israel and the Arab world is the difference between civilization and barbarism. It's the difference between good and evil... this is what we're witnessing in the Arabic world, They have no soul, they are dead set on killing and destruction. And in the name of something they call "Allah" which is very different from the God we believe... because our God is the God of love.

In March 2011 while being interviewed by Eliot Spitzer on CNN, Gabriel defended the speech, saying "I was talking about how Palestinian mothers are encouraging their children to go out and blow themselves up to smithereens just to kill Christians and Jews. And it was in that context that I – that I contrasted the difference between Israel and the Arabic world, was the difference between democracy and barbarism."

=== Arab–Israeli conflict ===
Regarding the two-state solution, Gabriel stated: "Forcing Israel to accept a two-state solution is not going to work unless the Palestinians first are forced to clean up their act and eliminate hatred from their schoolbooks, teach tolerance to their people, and preach acceptance of Israel and the Jews as a neighbor."

=== Iran–Israel proxy conflict ===
In a speech at a conference sponsored by the UN Permanent Mission of Palau and the Aja Eze Foundation, Gabriel said that she viewed Israel as the vanguard in the world's fight against Islamic terrorism, equating Israel's fight against Hamas and Hezbollah with the global fight against the Islamic State.

=== Raising the voting age ===
After record youth turnout in the 2022 US midterm election helped avert an expected 'red wave' of Republican wins in state races, Gabriel tweeted, "Raise the voting age to 21." on the social media platform Twitter.

== Bibliography ==
- Because They Hate: A Survivor of Islamic Terror Warns America. St. Martin's Press. 2006. ISBN 0-312-35837-7.
- They Must Be Stopped: Why We Must Defeat Radical Islam and How We Can Do It. St. Martin's Press. 2008. ISBN 978-0-312-38363-3.
