= Kevin Blaum =

American politician

Member of the Pennsylvania House of Representatives from the 121st district
- In office January 6, 1981 – November 30, 2006
- Preceded by: Bernard F. O'Brien
- Succeeded by: Eddie Day Pashinski

Personal details
- Born: June 4, 1952 (age 74) Wilkes-Barre, Pennsylvania, U.S.
- Party: Democratic
- Spouse: Elizabeth Ann
- Children: Caroline Blaum, Elizabeth Blaum
- Education: University of Scranton
- Occupation: College preparatory school admissions, Teacher

Kevin J. Blaum (born June 4, 1952, in Wilkes-Barre, Pennsylvania) is a former American politician who was a Democratic member of the Pennsylvania House of Representatives from Wilkes-Barre and the surrounding area for nearly three decades.

== Biography ==
Blaum is a 1970 graduate of James M. Coughlin High School. He earned a degree in Education and Political Science from the University of Scranton in 1974.

Blaum taught Government and American History at Bishop Hoban High School in Wilkes-Barre from 1975 until 1980. In 1975, he was elected to serve on the Wilkes-Barre City Council at the age of twenty-three in spite of his young age and placement at last on the ballot. Blaum's extensive door-to-door canvassing effort, which he claims hit "all doors in the city of Wilkes-Barre," played a significant part in securing his victory.

He was first elected to represent the 121st legislative district in the Pennsylvania House of Representatives in 1980 after defeating longtime Democratic incumbent Bernard F. O'Brien in a primary and easily trouncing a Republican opponent in the general election. The door-to-door campaign of Blaum again carried him to an impressive win, especially in the primary against the legendary O'Brien.

In 1994, Pennsylvania Governor Bob Casey awarded a $19.2 million state grant to construct the 10,000 seat Mohegan Sun Arena—initially dubbed the Northeastern Pennsylvania Convention Center—in Blaum's district. Blaum served as Chairman of the Arena Authority supervising the construction and management of the arena, and helped to lure Wilkes-Barre/Scranton Penguins of the American Hockey League to become primary tenants of the arena.

As chair of the House Aging and Youth Committee, Blaum crafted substantial changes in Pennsylvania's laws regarding child abuse and child protection laws, including Act 151 of 1994, which expanded the definition of child abuse to include children in "imminent risk of serious physical injury or sexual abuse," established child abuse background checks for school employees, and set up a system of reporting cases involving sexual abuse or serious bodily injury of students by school employees. He was also the architect of Pennsylvania's Underage Drinking Law and Pennsylvania's Ethics Act. He also crafted Act 20 of 1996, which eliminated many jurisdictional disputes over the collection of child support payments. He was honored with the Domestic Relations Association of Pennsylvania's "Presidents Award" in 1996 and with Common Cause of Pennsylvania's "Champion of Good Government Award" in 1989.

In 2004, he was elected Secretary of the House Democratic Caucus. He retired shortly after the 2006 election and announced his retirement in December 2005 at the arena, indicating to those gathered that he wanted the construction of the arena to define his legacy.

After retirement, Blaum served as an associate director of admission and the director of financial aid at Wyoming Seminary in Kingston, Pennsylvania until his retirement in the early 2010s. From 2008 to 2013, he wrote a weekly opinion column for Times Leader newspaper entitled "In the Arena."
