= Elrom Studios =

Israeli dubbing and localization company

Elrom Studios (Hebrew: אולפני אלרום) is an Israeli localization company, active in the fields of dubbing and subtitling to television channels, physical media and streaming services. The company was founded in 1984 at El Rom, a kibbutz in the Israeli-occupied Golan Heights.

In its facilities, it features the Movie Experience, a 3D film which describes the process of producing movie translation and subtitling.

== History ==
The company was founded in 1983 by a group of forty young members of the kibbutz who made farming by day and nothing at night. The Federation of Kibbutzes sent one film a week, which was screened at the local canteen. The team noticed that the translation of the films was of a lower quality, and told thedirector of the Histadrut cinema department to find ways to improve them. The team went to the Netherlands to learn advanced methods, and returned to Israel producing subtitles for 16mm movie releases. Later, the company started branching out into television, using its facilities to provide subtitles for US TV shows such as Beverly Hills 90210 and The Bold and the Beautiful. Almost every major television company was its client: HOT, Yes, IETV.

In 1998, it started dedicating itself to video game and software localization. In 2004, a subsidiary in Manhattan, New York, was subtitled, whose main activity is producing subtitles for the hard of hearing, as well as translation services.

In the 80s and 90s, it provided translation work for Middle East Television, beginning after an event where the station gave the studios hundreds of tapes, following the station's bombing by Hezbollah and the management moving to Greece.

As of the 2010s, it employs over 70 people, both at the El Rom kibbutz and in New York. Among its customers are Israeli distributors, the cable pay-TV companies Yes and HOT, as well as distributors in Israel and from around the world. The period between 2000 and 2016 was considered to be the time when it was most active. Usually, when a new movie was completed, it was shown at the kibbutz to check for any possible translation errors.

Uri Etun became its PR manager in 2010.

The company operated using an unsustainable operating model causing huge losses, which meant that, in 2020, the company had to suspend operations by selling its assets. Five staff members decided to acquire the company and changed the operating format under new management from 1 April 2021.

== Dubbing studios ==
In 1996, Elrom acquired Ulpaneto Ltd., founded in Tel Aviv in 1991 and owned by dubber Yoni Chen until his death in 1995. In a transitional period before Elrom acquired all of its assets, the studio was called Elrom-Ulpaneto.

Between 1992 and 1996, the dubbing department was managed by director Sharon Cohen, who later owned SC Produb.

Since 2004, Elrom has the dubbing rights for The Walt Disney Company titles. After Shafra Zakai left the dubbing sector in 2009, the company became the Disney's largest Hebrew-language dubbing provider, alongside Dubidub Studios. Elrom also provided services to other studios, such as Universal, as well as children's channels Hop! and Nickelodeon.

The dubbing and subtitle studios separated in January 2021, while keeping the same name. In early 2023, the dubbing studio changed its name to Perfect Voices and even made dubs in German to RTL Deutschland.

Elrom closed the studio on 30 April 2024, a move that surprised its staff.
