= 1967 Pennsylvania Amendment 1-A =

US state civil rights referendum

- May 16, 1967
- Shall article one of the Constitution relating to the Declaration of Rights be amended, by modernizing the wording of sections fifteen prohibiting the creation of special criminal tribunals; and nineteen prohibiting forfeiture of estates to the Commonwealth; prohibiting the denial to any person the enjoyment of any civil right by the Commonwealth and its political subdivisions and by eliminating therefrom the outmoded provision prohibiting emigration from the State?

Results
Choice	Votes	%
Yes	1,232,575	65.88%
No	638,365	34.12%
Yes
80–90%
70–80%
60–70%
50–60%
No
60–70%
50–60%

1967 Pennsylvania Amendment 1-A was a proposed amendment to the Constitution of Pennsylvania to prohibit the denial of any civil right by the Commonwealth of Pennsylvania, to repeal the provision prohibiting emigration from the state, to prohibit the creation of special criminal tribunals, and to prohibit forfeiture of estates to Pennsylvania.

== Results ==
The following table details the results by county:

County	Yes		No	
County	#	%	#	%
Adams	4,552	53.81	3,907	46.19
Allegheny	228,301	69.48	100,291	30.52
Armstrong	7,386	50.78	7,160	49.22
Beaver	30,507	70.54	12,742	29.46
Bedford	3,501	38.50	5,592	61.50
Berks	23,392	59.42	15,972	40.58
Blair	14,213	54.68	11,782	45.32
Bradford	6,896	65.15	3,688	34.85
Bucks	29,904	75.10	9,916	24.90
Butler	11,942	62.14	7,276	37.86
Cambria	28,678	71.24	11,579	28.76
Cameron	1,486	76.56	455	23.44
Carbon	4,808	67.49	2,316	32.51
Centre	11,017	74.90	3,691	25.10
Chester	28,380	73.49	10,236	26.51
Clarion	4,232	51.84	3,931	48.16
Clearfield	8,117	54.43	6,797	45.57
Clinton	3,967	58.48	2,816	41.52
Columbia	4,209	45.38	5,067	54.62
Crawford	8,719	67.11	4,273	32.89
Cumberland	12,152	58.13	8,752	41.87
Dauphin	19,702	58.36	14,058	41.64
Delaware	58,790	73.78	20,890	26.22
Elk	4,386	70.01	1,879	29.99
Erie	31,688	78.93	8,459	21.07
Fayette	13,749	61.07	8,766	38.93
Forest	787	65.80	409	34.20
Franklin	5,279	38.07	8,586	61.93
Fulton	538	35.58	974	64.42
Greene	5,373	54.58	4,472	45.42
Huntingdon	5,294	69.79	2,292	30.21
Indiana	9,713	63.81	5,509	36.19
Jefferson	6,009	61.23	3,805	38.77
Juniata	1,557	47.89	1,694	52.11
Lackawanna	39,892	82.83	8,271	17.17
Lancaster	21,656	67.34	10,505	32.66
Lawrence	11,586	61.72	7,185	38.28
Lebanon	7,059	62.91	4,162	37.09
Lehigh	21,047	66.34	10,679	33.66
Luzerne	64,318	65.99	33,141	34.01
Lycoming	14,362	64.69	7,839	35.31
McKean	3,491	70.50	1,461	29.50
Mercer	11,018	63.91	6,221	36.09
Mifflin	3,548	64.99	1,911	35.01
Monroe	4,594	66.90	2,273	33.10
Montgomery	52,482	75.08	17,418	24.92
Montour	1,616	50.87	1,561	49.13
Northampton	17,329	67.58	8,312	32.42
Northumberland	14,018	65.93	7,243	34.07
Perry	2,231	40.80	3,237	59.20
Philadelphia	153,661	63.19	89,519	36.81
Pike	1,195	59.66	808	40.34
Potter	2,003	59.12	1,385	40.88
Schuylkill	20,362	59.70	13,747	40.30
Snyder	2,733	55.75	2,169	44.25
Somerset	9,746	61.65	6,063	38.35
Sullivan	868	65.71	453	34.29
Susquehanna	4,485	54.91	3,683	45.09
Tioga	4,237	64.07	2,376	35.93
Union	3,224	61.06	2,056	38.94
Venango	6,647	68.14	3,108	31.86
Warren	6,346	74.65	2,155	25.35
Washington	27,984	64.79	15,211	35.21
Wayne	3,343	65.15	1,788	34.85
Westmoreland	39,076	58.59	27,618	41.41
Wyoming	2,149	49.87	2,160	50.13
York	15,045	54.39	12,615	45.61
Total	1,232,575	65.88	638,365	34.12

== Analysis ==
The inclusion of the words "civil rights" in the amendment "evoked a flood of votes, both pro and con."

== See also ==
- 1971 Pennsylvania Amendment 2
- 2021 Pennsylvania Amendment 3
