= 2021 Pennsylvania Amendment 3 =

Referendum protecting equal rights on the basis of race and ethnicity

- May 18, 2021
- Shall the Pennsylvania Constitution be amended by adding a new section providing that equality of rights under the law shall not be denied or abridged because of an individual's race or ethnicity?

Results
Choice	Votes	%
Yes	1,629,890	72.31%
No	624,208	27.69%

Yes
90–100%
80–90%
70–80%
60–70%
50–60%
No
70–80%
60–70%
50–60%
Tie
50%

2021 Pennsylvania Amendment 3 was a proposed amendment to the Constitution of Pennsylvania to guarantee equal rights on account of race and ethnicity. Supporters of the measure included Lieutenant Governor John Fetterman, the ACLU of Pennsylvania, and the Pennsylvania Democratic Party, while opposition to the change was mostly limited to social media. Placed on the ballot by Senate Bill 1166, it succeeded with over 72% of the vote in favor, and with the backing of every county except Fulton and Huntingdon.

== Background ==
During the 2019 to 2020 legislative session, Senate Bill 1166 was introduced, originally containing only the constitutional amendment question related to emergency powers. State Senator Vincent Hughes introduced an amendment that added Amendment 3, which was unanimously adopted by the Pennsylvania State Senate. Hughes' amendment came two weeks after the murder of George Floyd, with it being the first statewide ballot measure based on racial equity voted on following his death. The death of Floyd led to widespread protests.

Constitutional law professors believed that the amendment would not have much practical effect because of courts already considering race and ethnic discrimination to be in violation of both Pennsylvania's and the United States constitution.

It was the fourth equality provision to be a part of the state's constitution, following the clause stating that "all men and born equally free and independent," an amendment prohibiting sex discrimination from 1971, and a provision guaranteeing civil rights.

== Viewpoints ==
=== Support ===
==== Legislators ====
Democratic State Senator Vincent Hughes, who introduced the amendment, believed that court cases and judicial decisions would ultimately decide what the practical effect of the amendment would be, but he still saw it as a step in the right direction. He felt that discrimination based upon race was "cooked into the DNA of this nation" and he urged for others to "take action to explicitly prohibit racial and ethnic discrimination in Pennsylvania's Constitution." Hughes also said: "Any extra protection that we can provide around the issue of race and ethnicity, I think we need to be in the business of providing. And if we can add that extra protection to the state constitution, the lawyers I talk to said that that's a good thing."

Democratic Lieutenant Governor John Fetterman, who was also a candidate for the U.S. Senate at the time, stated on the day of the election that he and his wife, Giselle Fetterman, had done their part in voting. He said that there were, "Big questions including making sure Pennsylvania is able to respond in an emergency without partisan bickering." Fetterman and his wife opposed amendments 1 and 2, and supported amendment 3.

Republican State Representative Jesse Topper assured constituents of his who were skeptical of the amendment's effects that there was no ill intent. "There are some who are generally skeptical, because the word 'equality' has been somewhat co-opted over the years by left-leaning groups to mean whatever they want it to mean."

Democratic State Representative Donna Bullock said that if the equality amendment were to fail and the two GOP-backed governor emergency amendments passed, it would be an ominous sign. If that happened, she believed that it would "be a hit to morale," and that it would "say to me, personally, that we have a lot more work to do in this state to address racism and bias, and that it's deeper than we thought."

==== Other ====
===== Organizations =====
The ACLU of Pennsylvania supported the amendment, believing that it could have lasting impacts on issues such as systemic racism and that it would allow for state courts to make rulings against Pennsylvania governmental entities who had lacked action on providing equality of rights.

The Pennsylvania Democratic Party said that Amendment 3 "offers additional protection against laws or policies" that would abridge the legal rights of Communities of Color, and "codifies the progress many Pennsylvanians have fought for so long." It went on to say that top attorneys and lawmakers advised that "widely spread social media posts [that] suggest this amendment will create unforeseen civil rights vulnerabilities" were false, and that "Leading justice organizations like the ACLU support this measure." It urged individuals to vote in favor "to help ensure equal rights under the law for all Pennsylvanians."

The Northampton County Council approved in a unanimous, 8–0 vote, a resolution supporting the amendment.

===== Editorials =====
The Philadelphia Inquirer Editorial Board backed the amendment and recommended that people vote in favor, saying, "There are protections against discrimination in the Pennsylvania constitution, but this amendment aims to make it as clear as possible by adding to article I of the Commonwealth's constitution that 'equality of rights under the law shall not be denied or abridged because of an individual's race or ethnicity.'" This, it believed, would codify "an existing and important protection."

The Observer-Reporter Editorial Board supported the measure, saying that, "Sixteen other state constitutions have similar amendments," and that "Pennsylvania should join them." It also felt that the amendment "would spell out clearly that Pennsylvania does not countenance bigotry and intolerance based on race or ethnicity. Who, in the 21st century, could object to that?"

=== Opposition ===
Opposition to the amendment was small and limited to social media, with a majority of conservative messaging either keeping silent on the issue, or advocating for voters to support all three amendments on the ballot that year. One graphic, however, called for voters to support amendments one and two, but to oppose amendment 3, arguing that racial discrimination was already illegal, and that adding ethnicity to the constitution without defining it "invites extreme abuse of the law." The origin of the graphic was unclear.

=== Unclear/other viewpoints ===
==== Legislators ====
Democratic State Representative Tim Briggs thought that a reason for voters feeling uncertain of what the effects would be, was because the legislature had not held hearings on any of the three amendments. If the amendments were to pass and have unintended consequences, he said, another referendum would need to be held. Briggs believed that, "[a] constitutional amendment is a tough way to legislate, because when you don't put a lot of thought into what the consequences are, it's hard to correct."

==== Organizations ====
The League of Women Voters believed that if the amendment were passed, it "could add opportunity to bring ‘reverse discrimination’ cases," meaning that, "if a Caucasian person felt they were discriminated against by a State-run operation or agency in hiring, admissions, or denied opportunities, they could sue under this new law."

== Contents ==
The following question and information was included on voter's ballots for the May 18, 2021, Municipal Primary:

PROPOSED CONSTITUTIONAL AMENDMENT 3

PROHIBITION AGAINST DENIAL OR ABRIDGEMENT OF EQUALITY OF RIGHTS BECAUSE OF RACE OR ETHNICITY

Shall the Pennsylvania Constitution be amended by adding a new section providing that equality of rights under the law shall not be denied or abridged because of an individual's race or ethnicity?

() Yes

() No

== Results ==
Philadelphia County had the highest level of support of any county, with 84.44%, and Fulton County had the least, with 47.05% in favor. The Philadelphia metropolitan area had the sole three counties to have more than 80% of those voting to back the amendment: Delaware, Montgomery, and Philadelphia. The region coined "Pennsyltucky" had the sole two counties in opposition: Fulton and Huntingdon.

County	Yes		No		Citations
County	#	%	#	%	Citations
Adams	12,738	65.91	6,589	34.09	
Allegheny	193,866	77.69	55,659	22.31	
Armstrong	8,755	62.73	5,201	37.27	
Beaver	22,601	70.15	9,618	29.85	
Bedford	4,916	50.73	4,774	49.27	
Berks	39,104	62.76	23,202	37.24	
Blair	12,951	60.15	8,580	39.85	
Bradford	6,875	68.56	3,152	31.44	
Bucks	86,914	73.50	31,334	26.50	
Butler	26,041	64.80	14,148	35.20	
Cambria	15,872	64.07	8,901	35.93	
Cameron	584	66.82	290	33.18	
Carbon	7,249	66.08	3,721	33.92	
Centre	21,740	74.84	7,308	25.16	
Chester	72,895	76.55	22,334	23.45	
Clarion	3,957	52.47	3,585	47.53	
Clearfield	8,674	59.79	5,833	40.21	
Clinton	3,757	59.91	2,514	40.09	
Columbia	6,910	67.04	3,398	32.96	
Crawford	10,362	68.84	4,691	31.16	
Cumberland	37,729	72.47	14,333	27.53	
Dauphin	38,983	75.38	12,729	24.62	
Delaware	81,114	83.40	16,150	16.60	
Elk	4,293	66.61	2,152	33.39	
Erie	35,509	72.75	13,301	27.25	
Fayette	13,664	64.98	7,363	35.02	
Forest	760	61.44	477	38.56	
Franklin	15,950	59.45	10,879	40.55	
Fulton	1,429	47.05	1,608	52.95	
Greene	4,465	56.39	3,453	43.61	
Huntingdon	4,145	49.04	4,308	50.96	
Indiana	10,872	63.11	6,356	36.89	
Jefferson	4,997	56.27	3,883	43.73	
Juniata	2,940	58.74	2,065	41.26	
Lackawanna	34,940	73.90	12,337	26.10	
Lancaster	64,031	68.03	30,095	31.97	
Lawrence	9,854	63.48	5,669	36.52	
Lebanon	17,933	65.65	9,381	34.35	
Lehigh	38,145	74.44	13,100	25.56	
Luzerne	37,359	69.94	16,054	30.06	
Lycoming	14,082	63.53	8,083	36.47	
McKean	4,015	66.59	2,014	33.41	
Mercer	14,011	68.65	6,398	31.35	
Mifflin	4,914	62.57	2,939	37.43	
Monroe	14,591	73.69	5,210	26.31	
Montgomery	128,889	82.47	27,391	17.53	
Montour	2,409	72.02	936	27.98	
Northampton	30,641	71.37	12,290	28.63	
Northumberland	9,732	66.77	4,843	33.23	
Perry	6,556	64.98	3,533	35.02	
Philadelphia	173,033	84.44	31,892	15.56	
Pike	5,184	66.68	2,591	33.32	
Potter	2,132	59.84	1,431	40.16	
Schuylkill	17,934	63.74	10,204	36.26	
Snyder	4,766	65.15	2,549	34.85	
Somerset	9,360	60.08	6,220	39.92	
Sullivan	1,013	60.26	668	39.74	
Susquehanna	4,485	60.50	2,928	39.50	
Tioga	5,672	72.52	2,149	27.48	
Union	5,470	69.34	2,419	30.66	
Venango	5,713	61.72	3,543	38.28	
Warren	4,475	69.15	1,996	30.85	
Washington	27,759	66.61	13,912	33.39	
Wayne	6,697	63.99	3,768	36.01	
Westmoreland	47,093	63.17	27,451	36.83	
Wyoming	3,787	64.53	2,082	35.47	
York	49,604	67.17	24,243	32.83	
State total	1,629,890	72.31	624,208	27.69	

== See also ==
- State equal rights amendments
