= Pennsylvania State Education Association =

PSEA
- Pennsylvania State Education Association
- Headquarters: Harrisburg, Pennsylvania
- Location: United States
- Members: 142,420 ("active" and "life" members); 37,079 (other members) (2014)
- Affiliations: National Education Association
- Website: psea.org

The Pennsylvania State Education Association (PSEA) represents more than 187,000 teachers, educational support professionals, counselors, curriculum specialists, librarians, health care workers, school nurses, school dental hygienists, school nurses, school psychologists, school social workers, vocational-technical instructors, community college and junior college educators, students and retirees in the state of Pennsylvania.

PSEA represents the labor, policy, and professional interests of its members. PSEA bargains compensation and benefits, protects members’ rights, and advocates for their professions.

== Composition ==
According to PSEA's Department of Labor records since 2005, when membership classifications were first reported, around 80% of the union's membership are classified as "active" or "life" members, with eligibility to vote in the union. Other, voting ineligible, classifications include "retired," "student," "reserve" and "substitute/associate." PSEA contracts also cover some non-members, known as agency fee payers, which since 2005 have numbered comparatively about 3% of the size of the union's membership. As of 2014 this accounts for 27,809 "retirees" (15% of total), 7,902 "students" (4%), 816 "reserve," and 552 "substitutes/associates" (both <1%), plus 5,662 non-members paying agency fees, compared to 142,406 "active" members.

Total membership (US records)
View chart definition.
Finances (US records; ×$1000)
View chart definition.
