= Republican State Leadership Committee =

United States Republican Party organization

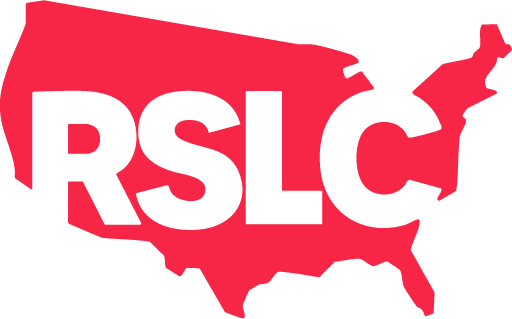
- Formation: 2002
- Purpose: To elect Republicans to U.S. state legislatures
- Chair: Steve Crisafulli
- Vice Chair: Christine Toretti
- Affiliations: Republican Party
- Website: rslc.gop

The Republican State Leadership Committee (RSLC) is a political organization designed to assist Republicans in capturing and holding control of state legislatures across the United States. The organization notably raised over $140 million from 2004 to 2014, working across the country. The RSLC's Democratic Party counterpart is the Democratic Legislative Campaign Committee (DLCC).

The organization has stated that it "is the largest caucus of Republican state leaders in the country and the only national organization whose mission is to elect down-ballot, state-level Republican officeholders" with efforts focused on "the offices of lieutenant governor, attorney general, secretary of state, state legislator, the judiciary and other down-ticket races." The RSLC has also asserted that they have "more than 150,000 donors in all 50 states."

The RSLC President position is currently held by Matt Walter. The RSLC has functioned since 2002, while their rivals in the DLCC got started after the 1992 elections.

After Ed Gillespie was announced chairman in January 2010, the RSLC is reported to have laundered $1.5 million from the Poarch Band of Creek Indians to Alabama Speaker Mike Hubbard and a group associated with Jack Abramoff. From January 2010 to January 2014 the RSLC paid Gillespie $654,000.

Political activist campaigns founded or co-founded by the RSLC include the "Judicial Fairness Initiative", the "Future Majority Project", and the "Right Women, Right Now" initiative. As of the aftermath of the 2014 U.S. elections, the Republican Party controls 68 out of 98 partisan state legislative chambers in the country, with the RSLC a major part of the efforts to hold onto these chambers into the future.

The RSLC is also the sponsoring organization of the .gop top-level Internet domain.

== History ==
The RSLC was established in 2002 with a leading Republican strategist Chris Jankowski as its "driving force". Through the RSLC Jankowski responded to the national fund-raising challenge faced by down-ballot state-level Republican candidates. (Note: By 2016, Jankowski was the "Executive Director of the RSLC’s REDistricting MAjority Project (REDMAP), a $20 million program that led the way in picking up nearly 700 legislative seats and 20 legislative chambers across the country.")

== See also ==
- List of state parties of the Republican Party (United States)
- Republican Governors Association
- Democratic Legislative Campaign Committee
