= 1975 New Jersey Public Question 2 =

Referendum on equal rights amendment

- 4 November 1975
- Shall Article 1 of the Constitution be amended, as agreed to by the Legislature, by the addition of the following paragraph? "20A. Equality of rights under the law shall not be denied or abridged on account of sex. The Legislature shall by law provide for the enforcement of the provisions of this paragraph."

Results
Choice	Votes	%
Yes	828,290	48.83%
No	868,061	51.17%
Yes
50%–60%
No
60%–70%
50%–60%

1975 New Jersey Public Question 2 was a proposed amendment to the Constitution of New Jersey to prohibit the denial or abridgment of equal rights on account of sex. The amendment failed, receiving 48.83% of the vote, and the support of 9 out of 21 counties.

== Background ==
The amendment was proposed as the federal Equal Rights Amendment was being debated.

Assembly Concurrent Resolution No. 67 placed the amendment on the ballot. In the New Jersey Senate, the resolution was passed by a 32 to 1 vote.

== Discussion ==
- State Senator Carol Bellamy: “There was such anxiety. So many women talked to had a sense that we wanted to take something away from them, some privilege or benefit that in most cases they don't really have.”
- State Senator Karen S. Burstein: "It came down to a question of credibility. They'd say E.R.A. would mean unisex toilets. We'd say there was no way E.R.A. would mean unisex toilets. Well, if someone came away believing there was even a 1‐in‐100 chance of unisex toilets, then she'd vote against E.R.A.”

== Contents ==
PUBLIC QUESTION No. 2

EQUALITY OF RIGHTS OF WOMEN

Shall Article 1 of the Constitution be amended, as agreed to by the Legislature, by the addition of the following paragraph?

"20A. Equality of rights under the law shall not be denied or abridged on account of sex. The Legislature shall by law provide for the enforcement of the provisions of this paragraph."

== Results ==
The following table details the results by county:

County	Yes		No	
County	#	%	#	%
Atlantic	22,009	52.61	19,823	47.39
Bergen	129,863	50.23	128,663	49.77
Burlington	35,828	54.68	29,691	45.32
Camden	57,771	57.78	42,209	42.22
Cape May	10,648	50.61	10,390	49.39
Cumberland	14,498	49.97	14,518	50.03
Essex	72,707	49.25	74,916	50.75
Gloucester	24,480	51.84	22,744	48.16
Hudson	58,701	52.74	52,597	47.26
Hunterdon	10,507	49.89	10,552	50.11
Mercer	43,460	56.42	33,564	43.58
Middlesex	66,141	47.58	72,874	52.42
Monmouth	61,266	48.58	64,845	51.42
Morris	46,432	44.68	57,487	55.32
Ocean	34,289	44.59	42,614	55.41
Passaic	33,448	38.24	54,018	61.76
Salem	7,503	49.79	7,565	50.21
Somerset	23,508	44.27	29,589	55.73
Sussex	10,603	42.96	14,076	57.04
Union	55,599	42.06	76,588	57.94
Warren	9,029	50.82	8,738	49.18
Total	828,290	48.83	868,061	51.17

== See also ==
- State equal rights amendments
