= Middle East Television =

Christian satellite television broadcasting network

- Type: Religious and general entertainment broadcasting
- Country: Cyprus
- Availability: Western Asia except Yemen; also in Afghanistan, Egypt, Greece, Libya, Sudan, Tajikistan, Turkmenistan, and Uzbekistan
- Owner: Messianic Vision
- Launch date: April 10, 1982
- Official website: metv.org

Middle East Television (METV) is a Christian satellite television broadcasting network located in Limassol, Cyprus. Programming on METV includes a mixture of Christian programming, plus non-religious entertainment programs like The Red Green Show, The Mary Tyler Moore Show, The Lone Ranger and NFL football.

The channel originated in 1981 in Lebanon, being acquired by the Christian Broadcasting Network in 1982. The network received significant attention in northern Israel via terrestrial overspill.

== History ==
=== The Voice of Hope and Hope TV, 1979–1982 ===
The station began its activity as a radio station, in September 1979, under the name The Voice of Hope, the product of an initiative by an evangelical Christian sect called High Adventure, led by a preacher named George Otis who raised donations for its establishment. The station operated from Marj Ayon under the auspices of the Army of Free Lebanon. The station was used for Christian religious broadcasts and propaganda broadcasts by the commander of the South Lebanon Army Saad Haddad. It mainly broadcast light music, in July 1981 it even cooperated with Kol Yisrael.

In February 1981, the station began trial broadcasts of a TV channel called Star of Hope (or Hope TV), for the purpose of broadcasting a relay station was established near Bint Jbeil. Otis received a permit from Haddad to broadcast on VHF channel 12. In order to finance the station's broadcasts, they raised donations in the United States, but planned to broadcast advertisements and contacted the Israeli businessman Haim Schiff as a partner for marketing advertising services in Israel. In August 1981, a broadcasting vehicle purchased by the station in the United States arrived at the port of Haifa. The broadcasting vehicle was placed on the other side of the Fatma Gate in Lebanese territory. The station's broadcasts were officially inaugurated in October 1981.

On March 9, 1983, the station's broadcast vehicle was damaged by a car bomb explosion, there were no casualties. Then it switched to broadcasting from a hill near Misgav Am, still on the Lebanese side of the border (the station did not receive permission to operate from Israeli territory).

=== Christian Broadcasting Network, 1982–2001 ===
On April 10, 1982, a Christian-based television station in South Lebanon, Hope TV, was donated to the Christian Broadcasting Network, and became METV. At this time METV broadcast from Marjayoun. The new facilities (from 1984) were in a fortified compound next to the headquarters of the South Lebanon Army. The geographic location of the transmitter was favorable to overspill, with two thirds of the signal received in much of Israel. In Israel, the channel was one of the few foreign channels available during the period of the state monopoly, being locally known as "Lebanon" or "Haddad", in reference to Saad Haddad. METV was known for broadcasting World Class Championship Wrestling and WWF wrestling which was not available on Israeli TV. The broadcasts were nicknamed "Catch". In the WCCW days, its stars such as the Von Erich family became famous in Israel, gaining many followers and becoming a part of Israeli culture. METV did not have a news unit; reports came from the three US TV networks, and, in this phase, its news bulletin often started with a news item on south Lebanon. Programming was spoken entirely in English with some programs subtitles into Arabic. In the early years, there were no Hebrew subtitles at all.

On August 14, 1984, activists of the Yad L'Achim organization began to demonstrate near the station's broadcasting vehicle, claiming that the station was carrying out missionary activity. The organization claimed that the station's activity was a sophisticated way to convert the Jews to Christianity, by combining popular television programs with the religious broadcasts and it called on the government to withhold services from the station staff. At one point in the late 80s, the station was bombed by Hezbollah, who destroyed some of its video archives, and, as consequence, gave hundreds of surviving reels to Elrom Studios to provide Hebrew subtitles. This decision motivated them to move to Greece, later Cyprus.

This logo was used from 1998 to 2010

On June 5, 1997, METV launched its 24-hour programming broadcast on the Israeli satellite Amos 2. This increased the potential audience from 11 million to 70 million viewers with a signal now reaching all of Western Asia (except Yemen), as well as Afghanistan, Egypt, Greece, Libya, Sudan, Tajikistan, Turkmenistan, and Uzbekistan. Up until then, the cable companies received the terrestrial signal direct from Lebanon in precarious quality. The start of satellite broadcasts to the Middle Eastern region also enabled the cable companies in Israel to broadcast METV on a uniform location, channel 24, and to receive the channel in better quality. The plans also outlined METV as a cheaper alternative for Israeli advertisers, as well as the opportunity for such advertisers to appear on the channel on Sundays and Thursdays, when METV's primetime had its programming translated to Hebrew. Negotiations with Israeli independent production companies were underway to create original programming for the Israeli market, as well as an agreement with the National Football League to carry its games, including the annual Super Bowl, on Sunday nights with Hebrew commentary. In addition, the Israeli company Charlton started to sell advertising time on the channel, and had the rights to the soccer matches that were broadcast on it from the English Premier League, the UEFA Champions League and the Italian league Serie A. These rights were formerly held by Channel 5, ICP's sports channel. The emergence of METV in this phase caused the channel to be referred to as "the other commercial channel".

On October 1, 1998, it conducted a combined broadcast of two football matches between Maccabi Haifa and Paris Saint-Germain and between Beitar Jerusalem and Glasgow Rangers, from the Champions League, which received a 29% viewing percentage in Israel. Due to its activity in the Israeli market, the franchisees of Channel 2 petitioned the High Court, in November 1998, with a request to order the cessation of cable broadcasts, which harmed their income from advertising. In January 1999, the Cable Broadcasting Council decided that the channel's broadcasts in Israel require a permit from the council, and without a permit, the broadcasts are prohibited and advertising is prohibited in them. Then an agreement was reached according to which the channel undertook to reduce the broadcasts with subtitles or dubbing into Hebrew, and the advertising for the Israeli market.

In anticipation of the Israeli decision to pull out of Southern Lebanon, Middle East Television began searching for a new broadcast facility in May 1999. On May 2, 2000, Middle East Television completed the construction of its new station and began its digital broadcast from Cyprus. A few weeks later, on May 30, its former facilities were seized by Hezbollah, though the station had already removed crucial equipment from Marjayoun in the weeks leading up to the relocation.

=== LeSEA Broadcasting, 2001–2016 ===
METV was sold to a like-minded ministry, LeSEA Broadcasting, in July 2001. LeSEA was already the owner of a handful of religious independent television stations with a similar mindset, combining religious programming with secular programming under strict editorial guidelines. In 2002, the channel refused to air Monday Night Football, as ESPN had the rights. Since neither of the two channels had exclusive rights, the likely reason was due to cost issues. In 2011, METV broadcast Super Bowl commercials for the first time, but with restrictions. Beer commercials and other commercials which were deemed immoral according to its guidelines were removed. Up until then, commercial slots were frequently occupied by promos for religious programming. As of 2012, the channel was uplinked from facilities in Indiana (where LeSEA had stations), then sent to Virginia, before being downlinked to Cyprus, where the station is based, and only then, arrived to operators in Israel. The channel received much criticism by Israelis, especially its followers of NFL coverage, due to its image quality, as the channel relied on a US satellite to deliver its signal.

=== Messianic Vision, since 2016 ===
In September 2016, LeSEA sold the station to Sid Roth's Messianic Vision, Inc. To fill the gap left by IBA's English news service, closed in 2015, the channel started airing newscasts produced by ILTV in Tel Aviv from February 2017.

== Logo ==
In the early years, a plain wordmark was used. The logo of METV, prior to the LeSEA Broadcasting purchase, used to be three cedar trees, in honor of the Flag of Lebanon.

== See also ==
- List of programs broadcast by Middle East Television
