= Pennsylvania House of Representatives, District 121 =

American legislative district

Pennsylvania's 121st State House of Representatives district
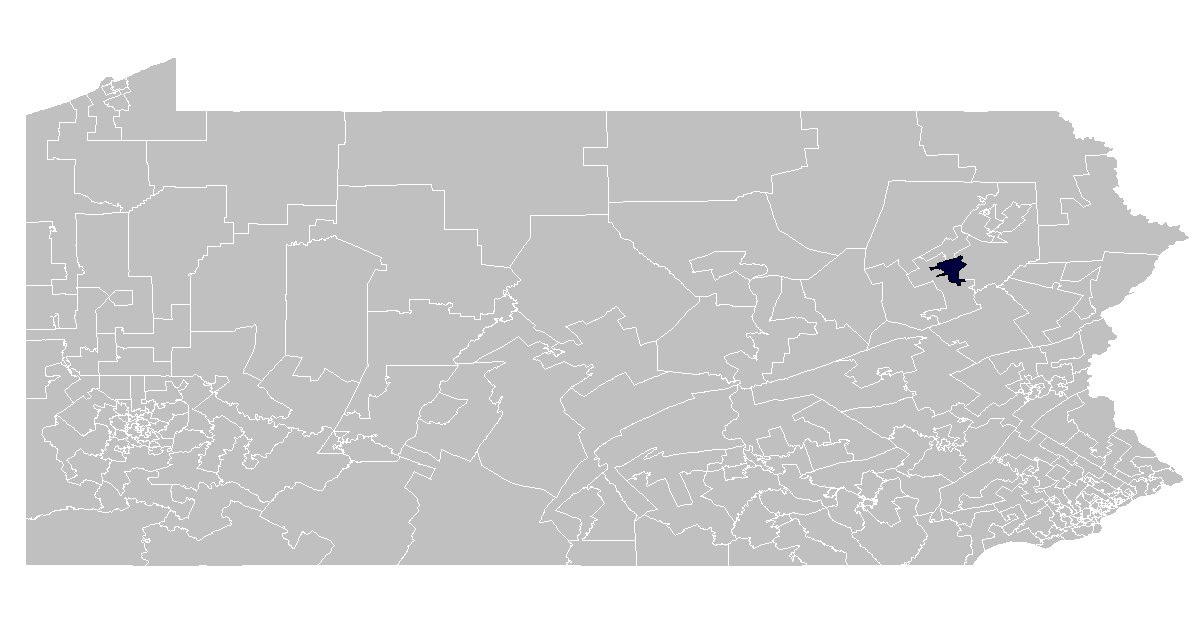
Representative
Eddie Day Pashinski; D–Wilkes-Barre
- Demographics: 83.8% White; 8.1% Black; 8.4% Hispanic
- Population (2011) • Citizens of voting age: 62,059; 49,379

The 121st Pennsylvania House of Representatives District is located in Luzerne County and has been represented by Eddie Day Pashinski since 2007. The district includes the following areas:

- Bear Creek Township
- Bear Creek Village
- Buck Township
- Laurel Run
- Plains Township
- Wilkes-Barre
- Wilkes-Barre Township

== Representatives ==
Representative	Party	Years	District home	Note
Prior to 1969, seats were apportioned by county.
Bernard F. O'Brien	Democrat	1969 – 1980		
Kevin Blaum	Democrat	1981 – 2006		
Eddie Day Pashinski	Democrat	2007 – present	Wilkes-Barre	Incumbent

== Recent election results ==
PA House election, 2010: Pennsylvania House, District 121
Party	Candidate	Votes	%	±%
Democratic	Eddie Day Pashinski	9,444	71.57	
Republican	James O'Meara	3,751	23.43	
Margin of victory		5,693	43.14	
Turnout		13,195	100	

PA House election, 2012: Pennsylvania House, District 121
Party	Candidate	Votes	%	±%
Democratic	Eddie Day Pashinski	15,617	100	
Margin of victory				
Turnout			100	

PA House election, 2014: Pennsylvania House, District 121
Party	Candidate	Votes	%	±%
Democratic	Eddie Day Pashinski	6,928	67.75	
Libertarian	Betsy Summers	3,298	32.25	
Margin of victory		3,630	35.5	
Turnout		10,558	100	

PA House election, 2016: Pennsylvania House, District 121
Party	Candidate	Votes	%	±%
Democratic	Eddie Day Pashinski	14,940	78.1	
Libertarian	Betsy Summers	4,189	21.9	
Margin of victory		10,751	56.2	▲20.7
Turnout		13,195	100	
