= Eddie Day Pashinski =

American politician (born 1945)

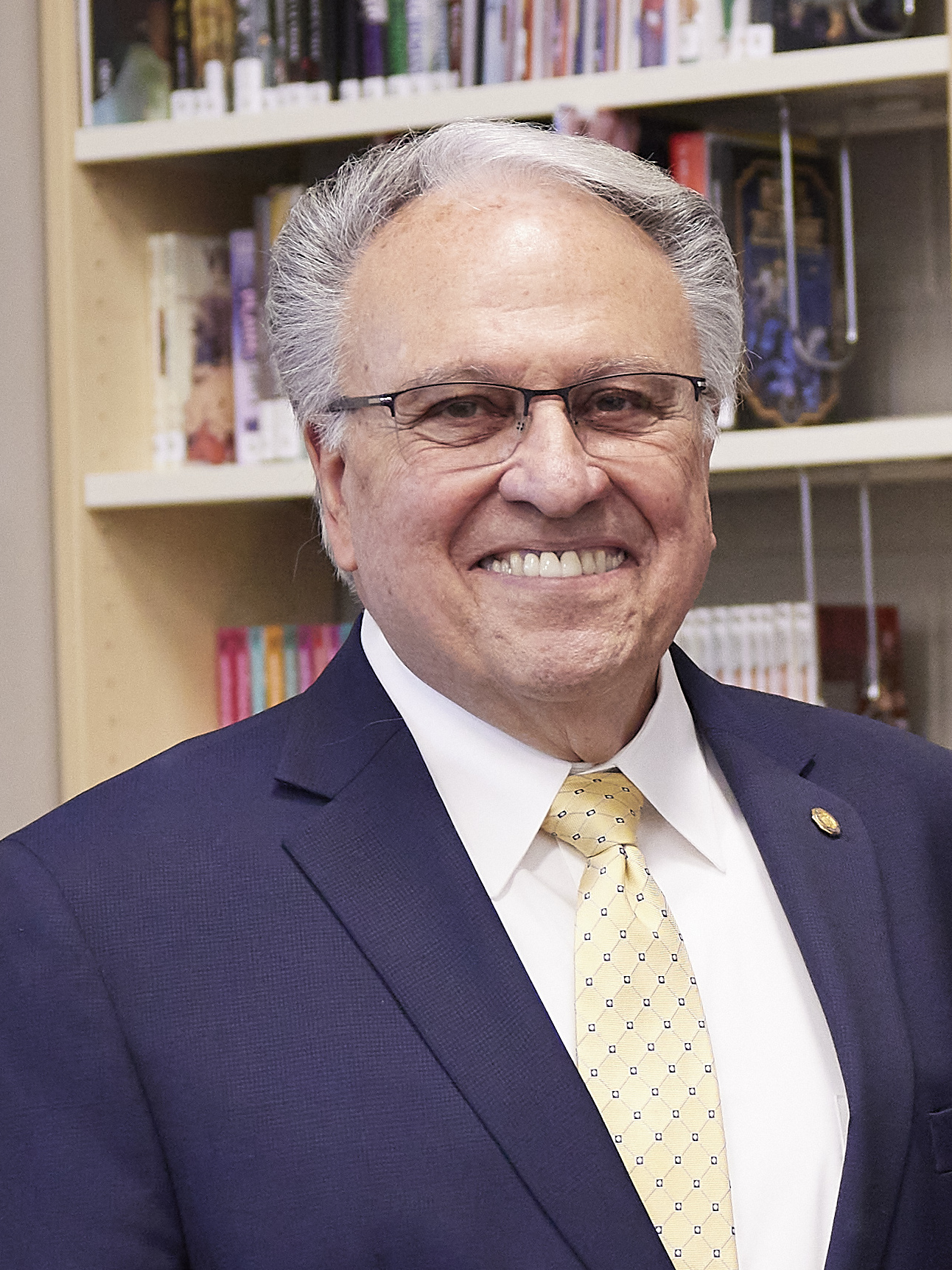
- Pashinski in 2022

Member of the Pennsylvania House of Representatives from the 121st district
- Incumbent
- Assumed office January 2, 2007
- Preceded by: Kevin Blaum

Personal details
- Born: July 2, 1945 (age 81)
- Party: Democratic
- Spouse: Millie Ritza (m. 1968; died 2014)
- Education: Wilkes University (BS)
- Website: www.pahouse.com/pashinski

Edwin A. "Eddie Day" Pashinski (born July 2, 1945) is a Democratic member of the Pennsylvania House of Representatives for the 121st District who was first elected in 2006. His district includes Wilkes-Barre, Wilkes-Barre Township, Ashley, Plains Township and two wards in Hanover Township, all in Luzerne County.

Pashinski earned a bachelor's degree in Music Education at Wilkes University and a Master's Equivalency at Penn State University. During college, he was involved in a band called The Starfires, income from which helped pay his tuition. After college, Pashinski began teaching at the Greater Nanticoke Area School District. He served for 35 years as a teacher, choral director and teachers' union leader. He is of Polish descent.

After retiring, Pashinski ran for the seat of Rep. Kevin Blaum, who was not seeking re-election. Pashinski prevailed over a field of three candidates in the 2006 Democratic primary election with 34.1%., overcoming a strong fundraising led by optometrist Brian O'Donnell.

In the 2006 general election, he defeated Republican Christine Katsock with 64.9% of the vote.

Pashinski currently sits on Agriculture & Rural Affairs committee as the Democratic Chair.

In 2023, Pashinski was inducted into the Luzerne County Arts & Entertainment Hall of Fame. He was inducted as a member of the Hall of Fame's inaugural class.
