= ACT for America =

American anti-Muslim advocacy group

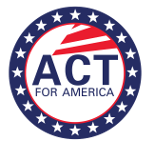
- Founded: 2007; 19 years ago
- Founder: Brigitte Gabriel
- Type: 501(c)(3) organization
- Location: Washington, D.C.
- Website: www.actforamerica.org

ACT for America, also referred to as ACT! for America, founded in 2007, is a US based advocacy group that stands against what it perceives as "the threat of radical Islam" to Americans. The group has been characterized by some media outlets as anti-Muslim.

Critics of the group, including the Southern Poverty Law Center and the Center for American Progress, describe it as a hate group. It has been called the U.S.'s largest anti-Muslim organization. Since 2017, the group has organized rallies in support of Donald Trump.

== Activities and views ==
The group's founder and central figure is the Lebanese-American conservative activist Brigitte Gabriel, a Maronite Catholic. Guy Rodgers, a Republican consultant who was National Field Director for the Christian Coalition of America in the 1990s, is executive director. The group was established in 2007, and grew out of the American Congress for Truth, which Gabriel established in 2002 to promote her beliefs, books, and public appearance. The American Congress for Truth was later renamed Act! for America Education and "continues to operate as a separate non-profit tax-exempt organization".

=== Anti-radical Muslim activities ===
Political scientist Nadia Marzouki identified ACT for America as part of an "echo chamber of Islamophobic misinformation". The group has been described as anti-Muslim by the Florida Center for Investigative Reporting, Buzzfeed News and the Independent, and a hate group by the Center for American Progress and the Southern Poverty Law Center. The Anti-Defamation League states that the "ACT stokes irrational fear of Muslims" through spreading misinformation and that it "propagates the hateful conspiracy theory" that there is a Muslim plot to impose Islamic law in the U.S. The organization has been considered a part of the counter-jihad movement.

The Huffington Post, linking to a report by the Center for American Progress, described ACT for America as "a central player in the movement to generate fears about Islamic Sharia law". The report describes the organization as a "single-minded Islamophobia [group]". Ryan Lenz of the Southern Poverty Law Center criticized the group as having "eagerly tapped into a groundswell of anti-Muslim rage and done what it could to fan the flames".

According to The New York Times, the conspiracy theorist Frank Gaffney, "a hawkish policy analyst and commentator, who has been known to take polarizing positions", described the group as a "force multiplier" in promoting laws proposed by David Yerushalmi. ACT members have introduced Yerushalmi's anti-foreign law bill (also known as anti-Sharia bill) in several state legislatures, accompanying it with "a public outreach blitz about the 'threat' of Sharia to America". Gabriel has promoted the belief that there is an Islamic conspiracy in the United States, stating that "tens of thousands of Islamic militants now reside in America operating in sleeper cells, attending our colleges and universities, even infiltrating our government" and asserting that radicalized Muslims "have infiltrated us at the CIA, at the FBI, at the Pentagon, at the State Department".

ACT has lobbied state and federal officials, seeking "to impact national security policy". These officials include U.S. Representative Peter T. King, Republican of New York, who appeared on ACT's "internet television show before hosting a series of hearings on radicalization that singled out Muslims in 2011". It once counted former U. S. National Security Advisor Michael T. Flynn as a member of its board; Flynn has criticized Islam in ways similar to ACT, such as that the Muslim faith itself is one of the root causes of Islamist terrorism; that Islam as a political ideology rather than a religion; that it is a malignant cancer; and that "fear of Muslims is rational". The group has published voter guides and congressional scorecards, and as of 2014 employed a full-time congressional lobbyist, Lisa Piraneo, who is the group's director of government relations.

In an e-mail distributed in July 2011, the group stated: "ACT! for America does not believe, nor advocate, that all Muslims are engaged in stealth jihad. ACT! for America does not believe, nor advocate, that all Muslims 'must be stopped'." The Southern Poverty Law Center, called this a "whitewash" and in reply quoted statements from founder Brigitte Gabriel:

If a Muslim who has—who is—a practicing Muslim who believes the word of the Koran to be the word of Allah, who abides by Islam, who goes to mosque and prays every Friday, who prays five times a day—this practicing Muslim, who believes in the teachings of the Koran, cannot be a loyal citizen to the United States of America.

The Anti-Defamation League writes that while ACT's leadership denies holding bigoted views, "the group often argues against the distinction between radical and mainstream Islam". According to the ADL, ACT had posted an article on its website titled "Stop Muslim immigration to the United States" and has promoted a petition demanding that the U.S. "stop all immigration into free countries by Muslims while we can" because "WE HAVE NO way of determining which Muslims subscribe to pure Islam. The reason this matters is that pure Islam is seditious".

A spokesman for the group at a 2016 town meeting near Missoula, Montana promoted conspiracy theories that Muslim immigrants were importing Islamic law into the U.S.

=== March Against Sharia ===
After an anti-Islamic white supremacist killed two intervening bystanders in a May 2017 metro train attack on a young woman in a hijab and her teenage black companion, Portland Mayor Ted Wheeler asked the federal government to deny a permit for a "Trump Free Speech Rally" at Terry Schrunk Plaza, a federal enclave adjacent to city hall, tweeting that the rally could "only exacerbate an already difficult situation" in the city, and called for withholding a permit for an ACT for America rally at the same location.

ACT for America subsequently cancelled its planned June 10 anti-Muslim March Against Sharia in Portland, moving it to Seattle. The Seattle Times described the rally's stated goal as "purportedly to raise awareness of the practices of genital mutilation and cutting of young girls and women, which the organization attributes to the practice of Sharia law by faithful Muslims". Despite the group's claim that female genital mutilation (FGM) is a solely religious practice, the Anti-Defamation League noted that FGM is not sanctioned or even mentioned in the Quran or Sharia law.

ACT for America demonstrators in New York City, Chicago, Santa Clara, Seattle, and other cities were outnumbered by counter-protesters. The marches were also attended by right-wing extremist groups such as militia members and white supremacists. Demonstrators in front of Trump Tower Chicago also expressed support for President Donald Trump.

== Membership ==
The group describes itself as a nonpartisan and nonreligious national security group and its base of support comes from "evangelical Christian conservatives, hard-line defenders of Israel (both Jews and Christians) and Tea Party Republicans". In 2011, the group said it had "500 chapters and 155,000 members nationwide".

In 2015, Jordan Denari and Nathan Lean of Georgetown University's Bridge Initiative research project wrote that ACT for America "boasts nearly 300,000 members and 890 chapters across the country". Reporting by The Independent and The Guardian has referred to the group as the largest anti-Muslim group in the U.S.
