= Spotlight PA =

Non-profit organisation in the USA

- Founded: 2019
- Type: Nonprofit
- Purpose: Journalism
- Location: Harrisburg, PA
- Region served: Pennsylvania
- Method: Foundation and member-supported
- CEO & President: Christopher Baxter
- Board Chairman: David Boardman
- Board of directors: Annie McCain Madonia, Kathleen Pavelko, Olivia Benson, George Fernandez, Michael Berry (ex officio)
- Website: Spotlight PA

Spotlight PA is an independent, nonpartisan and nonprofit newsroom dedicated to investigative and public-service journalism for Pennsylvania. The organization was founded in 2019 by the Lenfest Institute for Journalism and a coalition of news organizations in the state, and was built from the ground up by founding editor Christopher Baxter, who has since been promoted to chief executive officer and president. Since that time, Spotlight PA has become a leading national model for independent, collaborative journalism that informs and inspires residents to drive positive change. Spotlight PA has won numerous state, regional and national awards for its reporting, including the 2022 Freedom of Information Award from Investigative Reporters & Editors, the 2022 Gerald Loeb Award (local category), the 2022 Best Investigative Journalism Award from the Institute for Nonprofit News, and the 2021 Al Neuharth Innovation in Investigative Journalism Award from the Online News Association.

== History ==
Spotlight PA was founded by The Lenfest Institute for Journalism and officially launched in September 2019 as an independent newsroom operating through The Philadelphia Inquirer in partnership with founding newsrooms Pittsburgh Post-Gazette and PennLive/The Patriot-News. In 2020, TribLIVE/The Tribune-Review replaced the Post-Gazette among the founding partners. Also that year, Spotlight PA acquired PA Post, a nonprofit newsroom started by WITF Public Media in Harrisburg, which joined the founding members as part of that deal.

In August 2023, Spotlight PA went fully independent from its founding partners, reforming as a Pennsylvania nonprofit 501(c)(3) organization and acquiring all of its related assets from the Inquirer. The newly formed company is led by Baxter and a new board of directors, chaired by renowned journalism leader David Boardman.

== Mission ==
The mission of Spotlight PA is to hold private and public forces across Pennsylvania — especially governments, businesses and special interests — to account through urgent investigative journalism that drives change and strengthens democracy in Pennsylvania.

== Funding ==
Nonprofit newsrooms like Spotlight PA were created in response to the rejection of corporate-owned media in the country. They rely on donations from individuals and institutions who value the future of journalism.

Spotlight PA is supported by a dedicated group of local and national foundations, media partners, individual major donors (“Leaders in Action”), and thousands of readers across Pennsylvania (“members”). It discloses the source of every dollar it receives and does not accept anonymous gifts.
