= Association of Pennsylvania State College and University Faculties =

Association of Pennsylvania State and University

The Association of Pennsylvania State College and University Faculties (APSCUF) is the bargaining unit representing faculty and coaches at the 14 universities (formerly colleges) of the Pennsylvania State System of Higher Education (PASSHE). APSCUF was founded in 1937 as a professional association. It became the bargaining unit representing faculty in 1973. In 2000, APSCUF became the legal representative for the coaches at the 14 universities through a collective bargaining agreement.

APSCUF represents faculty and coaches at:

- Cheyney University
- Commonwealth University-Bloomsburg
- Commonwealth University-Lock Haven
- Commonwealth University-Mansfield
- East Stroudsburg University
- Indiana University of Pennsylvania
- Kutztown University
- Millersville University
- PennWest California
- PennWest Clarion
- PennWest Edinboro
- Shippensburg University
- Slippery Rock University
- West Chester University

In October 2016, the Association of Pennsylvania State College and University Faculties went on strike for the first time when negotiations between union and state representatives fell through. Thousands of university faculty members in Pennsylvania participated in the strike, which lasted October 19–21.
