= Bernard O'Brien (politician) =

American politician

Bernard F. O'Brien

Member of the Pennsylvania House of Representatives from the 121st district
- In office 1969–1980
- Preceded by: District created
- Succeeded by: Kevin Blaum

Member of the Pennsylvania House of Representatives from the Luzerne County district
- In office 1965–1968

Personal details
- Born: March 5, 1914 Wilkes-Barre, Pennsylvania
- Died: January 30, 2011 (aged 96) Mountain Top, Pennsylvania
- Party: Democratic

Bernard F. O'Brien (March 5, 1914 – January 30, 2011) was a Democratic member of the Pennsylvania House of Representatives from Wilkes-Barre, Pennsylvania.

== Biography ==
Born in Wilkes-Barre, Pennsylvania, on March 5, 1914, O'Brien attended James M. Coughlin High School.

O'Brien played an instrumental role in funding the construction of the Cross Valley Expressway in northeastern Pennsylvania. He was succeeded in the state House by Kevin Blaum, a young Wilkes-Barre city councilman who upset O'Brien in a Democratic primary.

== Death ==
O'Brien died in Mountain Top, Pennsylvania, on January 30, 2011.
