= Democratic Legislative Campaign Committee =

Democratic state legislative campaign organization

- Formation: 1992
- Chair: Andrea Stewart-Cousins (NY SD–35)
- Vice Chair: Javier Martínez (NM HD–11)
- Affiliations: Democratic Party
- Website: dlcc.org

The Democratic Legislative Campaign Committee (DLCC) is the U.S. Democratic Party organization that works to elect Democrats to state legislatures. The committee was formed after the 1992 elections by a group of Democratic state legislators and then-DNC chair David Wilhelm.

In terms of the politics of the United States, the DLCC has a rival in the Republican State Leadership Committee (RSLC).

== About ==
The DLCC works to win state legislative seats and chambers for Democrats. The DLCC's mission is to build and maintain winning campaign committees in all fifty states by providing campaign services through a continuing partnership with legislative leaders, professional staff, and supporters. DLCC spending priorities are focused on legislative seats and chambers where they can impact Democratic majority status.

The current chair of the DLCC is Andrea Stewart-Cousins, Majority Leader of the New York State Senate; she became chair in 2019. The committee is led in its day-to-day operations by its president, Heather Williams. From 2016 to 2023, the position was held by former president Jessica Post.

== See also ==
- Democratic Governors Association
- Republican State Leadership Committee
