= 1971 Pennsylvania Amendment 2 =

Referendum on equal rights based upon sex

- May 18, 1971
- Shall Article I of the Constitution be amended by adding a new section, prohibiting any denial or abridgment of rights because of an individual's sex?

Results
Choice	Votes	%
Yes	783,439	62.76%
No	464,915	37.24%

Yes
80–90%
70–80%
60–70%
50–60%
No
70–80%
60–70%
50–60%
Other
Tie
No votes

1971 Pennsylvania Amendment 2 was a proposed amendment to the Constitution of Pennsylvania to guarantee equal rights on account of sex. Placed on the ballot by House Bill 1678 and House Bill 14, the measure was approved with over 62% of the vote in favor, and with the backing of 61 of Pennsylvania's 67 counties.

== Legislation ==
House Bill 1678 of the 1969–1970 regular session and House Bill 14 of the 1971–1972 regular session placed the amendment on the ballot. Both bills' prime sponsor was State Rep. Gerald Kaufman. Kaufman introduced the first bill after he was urged to do so by six women who, at the time, were members of the Pennsylvania General Assembly. No hearings were held on the bills, and both were passed by the Pennsylvania House of Representatives and Pennsylvania Senate unanimously in both sessions.

The original text of the bill proposed that the constitution be amended to add the following language:

Section 27. Prohibition Against Denial or Abridgment of Equality or Rights Because of Sex.—Equality of rights under the law shall not be denied or abridged by the Commonwealth of Pennsylvania because of the sex of the individual.

Two subsequent amendments to the bill, however, tweaked the wording. One amended the language to say that equal rights could not be denied or abridged "in the Commonwealth of Pennsylvania" rather than "by the Commonwealth of Pennsylvania," and the second one fixed the typo in the section's title from "Equality or Rights" to "Equality of Rights". The numbering of the amendment incorrectly being Section 27 rather than Section 28 was, however, not changed. After being ratified, the section initially was even erroneously identified as Section 27, and certain court cases, such as Commonwealth v. Santiago, 340 A.2d 440, 445 (Pa. 1975), cited the section as such.

== Endorsements ==
Yes

Newspapers

- The Danville News
No

Newspapers

- The Philadelphia Inquirer
- The Scranton Times-Tribune

== Contents and amendment ==
=== Ballot wording ===
The measure, which was decided by voters on May 18, 1971, alongside four other amendments, had the following question and information shown to voters for it:

Joint Resolution 2

Shall Article I of the Constitution be amended by adding a new section, prohibiting any denial or abridgment of rights because of an individual's sex?

Yes

No

=== Amendment language ===
The amendment added Section 28 to Article 1 of the Constitution of Pennsylvania:

Section 28. Prohibition Against Denial or Abridgement of Equality of Rights because of Sex.—Equality of rights under the law shall not be denied or abridged in the Commonwealth of Pennsylvania because of the sex of the individual.

== Results ==
Percentage of Pennsylvania voters who cast a vote on Amendment 2 by county. Turnout percentage: 50–60%; 40–50%; 30–40%; 20–30%; 10–20%; No votes

61 counties voted in favor, 5 voted against, and Forest County cast no votes on the measure. (Note: Forest County election officials wrote in place of the certified results that a printing error had occurred on the ballot, which was not discovered until around 10 A.M. on Election Day, so no voting took place on any of the amendments on the ballot that election. The officials noted that 1,455 votes were cast in the county.) The highest level of support came from Allegheny County, with 69.92% in favor, and the lowest level came from Huntingdon County, with 36.80% in favor.

County	Yes		No	
County	#	%	#	%
Adams	3,330	57.26	2,486	42.74
Allegheny	139,449	69.92	59,978	30.08
Armstrong	9,586	57.64	7,045	42.36
Beaver	23,678	58.34	16,910	41.66
Bedford	2,846	53.94	2,430	46.06
Berks	16,812	66.05	8,642	33.95
Blair	10,551	47.04	11,877	52.96
Bradford	6,336	57.74	4,638	42.26
Bucks	17,785	66.90	8,800	33.10
Butler	10,284	64.99	5,539	35.01
Cambria	18,485	59.99	12,331	40.01
Cameron	1,171	65.93	605	34.07
Carbon	1,770	61.31	1,117	38.69
Centre	7,673	66.76	3,820	33.24
Chester	22,656	66.06	11,641	33.94
Clarion	3,694	58.86	2,582	41.14
Clearfield	5,581	51.40	5,277	48.60
Clinton	4,260	56.54	3,275	43.46
Columbia	6,007	54.32	5,052	45.68
Crawford	5,431	66.88	2,690	33.12
Cumberland	8,120	64.97	4,379	35.03
Dauphin	10,331	65.24	5,505 (Note: The municipality-level results for Dauphin County add up to 5,505 no votes, 33 more than the certified number of 5,472.)	34.76
Delaware	29,564 (Note: The municipality-level results for Delaware County add up to 29,564 yes votes, six more than the certified number of 29,558.)	69.28	13,112	30.72
Elk	3,163	56.25	2,460	43.75
Erie	23,416	64.90	12,664	35.10
Fayette	7,434	58.83	5,202	41.17
Forest (Note: Forest County election officials wrote in place of the certified results that a printing error had occurred on the ballot, which was not discovered until around 10 A.M. on Election Day, so no voting took place on any of the amendments on the ballot that election. The officials noted that 1,455 votes were cast in the county.)	-	-	-	-
Franklin	5,577	57.91	4,054	42.09
Fulton	567	41.33	805	58.67
Greene	4,716	57.55	3,479	42.45
Huntingdon	2,274	36.80	3,905	63.20
Indiana	7,351 (Note: The municipality-level results for Indiana County add up to 7,351 yes votes, eight less than the certified number of 7,359.)	58.14	5,293	41.86
Jefferson	6,469	60.31	4,258	39.69
Juniata	1,279	57.23	956	42.77
Lackawanna	13,036	47.33	14,504	52.67
Lancaster	10,640	55.97	8,369	44.03
Lawrence	8,851	61.24	5,602	38.76
Lebanon	5,625	66.11	2,884	33.89
Lehigh	12,171	64.05	6,830	35.95
Luzerne	11,271	61.43	7,077	38.57
Lycoming	11,052	57.17	8,280	42.83
McKean	2,053	62.86	1,213	37.14
Mercer	6,442	64.95	3,476	35.05
Mifflin	2,732	57.04	2,058	42.96
Monroe	2,913	61.95	1,789	38.05
Montgomery	33,278	69.56	14,564	30.44
Montour	1,962	55.44	1,577	44.56
Northampton	6,726	62.67	4,007	37.33
Northumberland	9,686	54.26	8,166	45.74
Perry	1,952	55.27	1,580	44.73
Philadelphia	105,855	63.98	59,596	36.02
Pike	642	62.39	387	37.61
Potter	2,010	59.15	1,388	40.85
Schuylkill	15,916	62.88	9,396	37.12
Snyder	2,433	53.27	2,134	46.73
Somerset	6,412	53.67	5,536	46.33
Sullivan	824	58.86	576	41.14
Susquehanna	3,489	50.97	3,356	49.03
Tioga	4,142	60.80	2,670	39.20
Union	2,412	53.45	2,101	46.55
Venango	4,979	66.34	2,526	33.66
Warren	2,735	67.25	1,332	32.75
Washington	24,316	61.22	15,403	38.78
Wayne	1,762	49.27	1,814	50.73
Westmoreland	25,967	64.41	14,348	35.59
Wyoming	2,399	55.89	1,893	44.11
York	9,110	61.61	5,676	38.39
State total	783,439 (Note: The municipality-level results for Delaware County add up to 29,564 yes votes, six more than the certified number of 29,558. The municipality-level results for Indiana County add up to 7,351 yes votes, eight less than the certified number of 7,359. As such, two votes have been subtracted from the statewide yes total (783,441 to 783,439).)	62.76	464,915 (Note: The municipality-level results for Dauphin County add up to 5,505 no votes, 33 more than the certified number of 5,472. As such, 33 votes have been added to the statewide no total (464,882 to 464,915).)	37.24

== Analysis and later events ==
Pennsylvania became the first state in the United States to amend its constitution to add an equal rights amendment. Two other states, Utah and Wyoming, had equal rights provisions before 1971, but those had been adopted alongside their state constitutions, rather than being added by an amendment.

In 2021, Pennsylvania amended its constitution to ban racial and ethnic discrimination.
