= 2017 Pennsylvania elections =

- November 7, 2017

Elections were held in Pennsylvania on November 7, 2017, to fill judicial positions on the Supreme Court, Superior Court, and the Commonwealth Court, to allow judicial retention votes, and to fill numerous county, local and municipal offices.

The necessary primary elections were held in May 2017.

== Special elections ==
=== Pennsylvania House of Representatives ===
==== 133rd legislative district ====
A special election for the 133rd legislative district took place on December 5, following the death of Democratic state representative Daniel McNeill.

Democrats selected McNeill's wife Jeanne McNeill as their nominee. Republicans nominated David Molony and Libertarians nominated Samantha Dorney.

Pennsylvania House of Representatives, District 133 special election, 2017
Party	Candidate	Votes	%
Democratic	Jeanne McNeill	2,302	67.43
Republican	David Molony	992	29.06
Libertarian	Samantha Dorney	120	3.51
Total votes		3,414	100.00
Democratic hold			

==== 197th legislative district ====
Democratic state representative Leslie Acosta was re-elected during the 2016 elections, but later resigned after pleading guilty to charges of embezzlement. A special election for the 197th legislative district took place on March 21.

Republicans nominated Lucinda Little for the seat. Democrats originally nominated health clinic administrator Frederick Ramirez, but a Commonwealth Court ruling declared that Ramirez did not reside in the district and removed him from the ballot. Democrats attempted to replace Ramirez with Philadelphia Parking Authority auditor Emilio Vazquez, but the Court ruled (and the Supreme Court of Pennsylvania confirmed) that the filing deadline had passed, preventing the substitution. Vazquez subsequently ran a write-in campaign, along with Green Party candidate Cheri Honkala.

Following the special election, four elections officers were charged with interference after allegations of duress and voter intimidation were made.

Pennsylvania House of Representatives, District 197 special election, 2017
Party	Candidate	Votes	%
Democratic	Emilio Vazquez (write-in)	1,972	73.20
Green	Cheri Honkala (write-in)	286	10.62
Write-in		235	8.72
Republican	Lucinda Little	201	7.46
Total votes		2,694	100.00
Democratic hold			

== Justice of the Supreme Court ==
2017 Pennsylvania Supreme Court election
- November 7, 2017

Nominee	Sallie Mundy	Dwayne Woodruff
Party	Republican	Democratic
Popular vote	1,090,485	995,540
Percentage	52.3%	47.7%
- County results Mundy: 50–60% 60–70% 70–80% 80–90% Woodruff: 50–60% 60–70% 80–90%
Justice before election
Sallie Mundy
Republican
Elected Justice
Sallie Mundy
Republican

One seat was up for election after Justice Michael Eakin resigned on March 15, 2016. Republican Superior Court judge Sallie Updyke Mundy was appointed by Governor Tom Wolf to the seat vacated by Justice Eakin and was subsequently confirmed on June 27, 2016. Justice Mundy ran for a full 10-year term.

=== Republican primary ===
==== Candidates ====
- Sallie Mundy, incumbent Justice of the Supreme Court of Pennsylvania

==== Results ====
Republican primary results
Party	Candidate	Votes	%
Republican	Sallie Mundy (incumbent)	469,214	100.0%
Total votes		469,214	100.0%

=== Democratic primary ===
==== Candidates ====
- Dwayne Woodruff, Judge of the Allegheny County Court of Common Pleas, former Pittsburgh Steelers cornerback

==== Results ====
Democratic primary results
Party	Candidate	Votes	%
Democratic	Dwayne Woodruff	633,112	100.0%
Total votes		633,112	100.0%

=== General election ===
==== Results ====
2017 Pennsylvania Supreme Court election
Party	Candidate	Votes	%
Republican	Sallie Updyke Mundy (incumbent)	1,090,485	52.28%
Democratic	Dwayne Woodruff	995,540	47.72%
Total votes		2,086,025	100.0%
Republican hold			

== Judge of the Superior Court ==
2017 Pennsylvania Superior Court election
- November 7, 2017

4 seats of the Superior Court of Pennsylvania
	Majority party	Minority party
Candidate	Maria McLaughlin; Deborah Kunselman; Carolyn Nichols; Geoff Moulton	Mary Murray; Craig Stedman; Emil Giordano; Wade Kagarise
Party	Democratic	Republican
Last election	6	9
Seats won	3	1
Seat change	▲1	▼1
Popular vote	3,991,975	3,554,632
Percentage	52.16%	46.44%
- County results Democrat: 40–50% 50–60% 60–70% 80–90% Republican: 40–50% 50–60% 60–70% 70–80%

Four seats of the Superior Court were up for election.

- A seat vacated by the retirement of Judge Cheryl Lynn Allen in September 2015. Governor Wolf appointed Republican Carl Solano as the interim appointee. Solano did not run for a full term.
- Seat vacated by the elevation of Judge Christine Donohue to the Pennsylvania Supreme Court in 2015. Lillian Ransom, a Democrat, was appointed by Governor Wolf to fill the seat through the election. Ransom indicated she would not run for a full term.
- Third vacancy created by the elevation Judge David Wecht after being elected, along with Judge Donohue, to the Pennsylvania Supreme Court in 2015. Democrat Geoffrey Moulton was appointed by Governor Wolf to fill the seat, and ran for a full term.
- A fourth seat became vacant due to then–Judge Sallie Mundy's appointment to the Pennsylvania Supreme Court in July 2016. The seat remained vacant through the election.

=== Democratic primary ===
==== Candidates ====
- William Caye, Allegheny County prosecutor
- Deborah Kunselman, Judge of the Beaver County Court of Common Pleas
- Maria McLaughlin, Judge of the Philadelphia County Court of Common Pleas
- Carolyn Nichols, Judge of the Philadelphia County Court of Common Pleas
- H. Geoffrey Moulton Jr., incumbent Judge of the Superior Court of Pennsylvania

===== Withdrawn =====
- Albert Flora Jr., criminal defense attorney
- Lillian Harris Ransom, incumbent Judge of the Superior Court of Pennsylvania

==== Results ====
Democratic primary results (vote for 4)
Party	Candidate	Votes	%
Democratic	Maria McLaughlin	460,250	23.30%
Democratic	Carolyn Nichols	448,675	22.72%
Democratic	Deborah Kunselman	432,937	21.92%
Democratic	Geoffrey Moulton Jr. (incumbent)	361,547	18.31%
Democratic	William Caye II	271,533	13.75%
Total votes		1,974,942	100.0%

=== Republican primary ===
==== Candidates ====
- Emil Giordano, Judge of the Northampton County Court of Common Pleas
- Wade Kagarise, Judge of the Blair County Court of Common Pleas
- Mary Murray, Judge of the Allegheny County Magisterial District Court
- Paula Patrick, Judge of the Philadelphia County Court of Common Pleas
- Craig Stedman, Lancaster County district attorney

===== Withdrawn =====
- Carl Solano, incumbent Judge of the Superior Court of Pennsylvania

==== Results ====
Republican primary results (vote for 4)
Party	Candidate	Votes	%
Republican	Craig Stedman	380,027	24.66%
Republican	Emil Giordano	320,394	20.79%
Republican	Wade Kagarise	317,511	20.61%
Republican	Mary P. Murray	295,138	19.15%
Republican	Paula A. Patrick	227,751	14.78%
Total votes		1,540,821	100.0%

=== Third parties ===
==== Candidates ====
- Jules Mermelstein (Green), attorney and former Upper Dublin Township commissioner (1992–2011)

=== General election ===
==== Results ====
2017 Pennsylvania Superior Court election (vote for 4)
Party	Candidate	Votes	%
Democratic	Maria McLaughlin	1,078,522	14.09%
Democratic	Deborah Kunselman	1,041,965	13.61%
Democratic	Carolyn Nichols	978,842	12.79%
Republican	Mary Murray	918,705	12.00%
Republican	Craig Stedman	914,284	11.95%
Democratic	Geoffrey Moulton Jr. (incumbent)	892,646	11.66%
Republican	Emil Giordano	885,996	11.58%
Republican	Wade Kagarise	835,647	10.92%
Green	Jules Mermelstein	106,969	1.40%
Total votes		7,653,576	100.0%
Democratic hold			
Democratic hold			
Democratic gain from Republican			
Republican hold			

== Judge of the Commonwealth Court ==
2017 Pennsylvania Commonwealth Court election
- November 7, 2017

2 seats of the Commonwealth Court of Pennsylvania
	Majority party	Minority party
Candidate	Ellen Ceisler; Irene Clark	Christine Fizzano Cannon; Paul Lalley
Party	Democratic	Republican
Last election	7	2
Seats won	1	1
Seat change	Steady	Steady
Popular vote	1,946,679	1,905,581
Percentage	50.53%	49.47%
- County results Democrat: 50–60% 60–70% 80–90% Republican: 50–60% 60–70% 70–80%

Two seats were up for election.

- Judge Bernard McGinley retired from the court on January 31, 2016. Governor Wolf appointed Democrat Joseph Grove to fill the vacancy, who ran for a full term.
- Judge Bonnie Brigace Leadbetter became a senior judge on January 31, 2016. Julia Hearthway was appointed to fill the vacant seat. Judge Hearthway, a Republican, did not run for a full term, and vacated her seat on September 1, 2017.

=== Democratic primary ===
==== Candidates ====
- Bryan Barbin, state representative
- W. Timothy Barry, municipal solicitor
- Ellen Ceisler, Judge of the Philadelphia County Court of Common Pleas
- Irene McLaughlin Clark, former Judge of the Pittsburgh Municipal Court
- Joseph Cosgrove, incumbent Judge of the Commonwealth Court of Pennsylvania
- Todd Eagen, managing partner, Welby, Stoltenberg, Cimballa & Cook, LLC

==== Results ====
Democratic primary results (vote for 2)
Party	Candidate	Votes	%
Democratic	Ellen Ceisler	280,209	24.28%
Democratic	Irene Clark	237,287	20.56%
Democratic	W. Timothy Barry	215,904	18.71%
Democratic	Todd Eagen	180,654	15.65%
Democratic	Joseph Cosgrove (incumbent)	169,869	14.72%
Democratic	Bryan Barbin	70,201	6.08%
Total votes		1,154,124	100.0%

=== Republican primary ===
==== Candidates ====
- Christine Fizzano Cannon, Judge of the Delaware County Court of Common Pleas, former Delaware County commissioner (2007–2011)
- Paul Lalley, senior associate, Campbell Durrant, P.C

===== Declined =====
- Julia Hearthway, incumbent Judge of the Commonwealth Court of Pennsylvania

==== Results ====
Republican primary results (vote for 2)
Party	Candidate	Votes	%
Republican	Paul Lalley	400,090	53.57%
Republican	Christine Fizzano Cannon	346,755	46.43%
Total votes		746,845	100.0%

=== General election ===
==== Results ====
2017 Pennsylvania Commonwealth Court election (vote for 2)
Party	Candidate	Votes	%
Republican	Christine Fizzano Cannon	994,163	25.81%
Democratic	Ellen Ceisler	988,295	25.65%
Democratic	Irene Clark	958,384	24.88%
Republican	Paul Lalley	911,418	23.66%
Total votes		3,852,260	100.0%
Republican hold			
Democratic hold			

== Judicial retention ==
=== Supreme Court ===
Chief Justice Thomas G. Saylor (R) Retention, 2017
Choice	Votes	%
For	1,074,905	68.25
Against	500,162	31.75
Total	1,575,067	100.00
Source: PA Department of State

Justice Debra Todd (D) Retention, 2017
Choice	Votes	%
For	1,121,007	70.83
Against	461,751	29.17
Total	1,582,758	100.00
Source: PA Department of State

=== Superior Court ===
Judge Jacqueline Shogan (R) Retention, 2017
Choice	Votes	%
For	1,073,774	69.31
Against	475,429	30.69
Total	1,549,203	100.00
Source: PA Department of State

== Ballot questions ==
Proposed Constitutional Amendment Amending the Homestead Property Tax Assessment Exclusion
Choice	Votes	%
For	963,324	53.99
Against	821,002	46.01
Total	1,784,326	100.00
Source: PA Department of State

Amendment results by county Yes: 80–90%; 70–80%; 60–70%; 50–60%; No: 60–70%; 50–60%
