= TVE =

TVE may stand for:

== Television ==
- Televisión Española, a Spanish state-owned public-service television broadcaster
  - TVE HD, a high-definition channel run by Televisión Española
- TVE Brasil (Brazilian network) (TV Educativa do Rio de Janeiro), a now defunct public television station and network in Rio de Janeiro, now TV Brasil Rio de Janeiro
- TV E, a Montenegrin television station
- TV Edukasi, a defunct Indonesian TV channel
- TV Everywhere, IPTV verification system
- Television Trust for the Environment, a TV production company

== Other uses ==
- Tickford Vehicle Engineering, an Australian joint operation between Tickford of Europe and Ford Australia
- Township and Village Enterprises, in China
- Transrapid-Versuchsanlage Emsland, Emsland Transrapid Test Facility for maglev trains in Emsland, Germany
