= Cheri Honkala =

American politician (born 1963)

- Honkala in 2012

Personal details
- Born: Cheri Lynn Honkala; January 12, 1963 (age 63) Minneapolis, Minnesota, U.S.
- Party: Green
- Children: 2, including Mark Webber
- Relatives: Teresa Palmer (daughter-in-law)

Cheri Lynn Honkala (/ˈʃɛri ˈhɒŋkələ/; born January 12, 1963) is an American anti-poverty advocate, co-founder of the Kensington Welfare Rights Union (KWRU) and co-founder and National Coordinator of the Poor People's Economic Human Rights Campaign, also called the Poor People's Army. She has been a noted advocate for human rights in the United States and internationally. She is the mother of actor Mark Webber.

She was featured prominently in the 1997 book Myth of the Welfare Queen by Pulitzer Prize-winning journalist David Zucchino. In 2011, Honkala was the Green Party candidate for Sheriff of Philadelphia, running on the promise of refusing to evict families from their homes. She was the Green Party's nominee for vice-president in the 2012 U.S. presidential election.

== Early life ==
Cheri Honkala was born in Minneapolis, Minnesota, in 1963. Her father, Maynard Duane Honkala, was of Finnish ancestry. She grew up watching her mother suffer from domestic violence. Honkala's mother quietly endured this abuse for fear of losing her children. Honkala was removed from the household and spent most of her youth incarcerated in a total of nine youth detention facilities.

When Honkala was 17, her 19-year-old brother Mark, who suffered from mental health issues, died by suicide. Because he was uninsured, he could not afford to get the professional help he needed. At the time of Mark's suicide, Honkala was already a mother (with a son, Mark, named after her brother), living out of her car and going to high school. Despite her difficult upbringing, she managed to graduate.

After living in an apartment in Minnesota, Honkala and her young son were forced to move out and live out of their white Camaro. She and her son became homeless after the Camaro was demolished by a drunk driver. Honkala could not find a shelter that would allow them to remain together that winter. To stay together and keep from freezing, Honkala decided to move into an abandoned Housing and Urban Development (HUD) home. She would later comment, "I chose to live, and I chose to keep my son alive." She called a press conference, in which she said, "This is me, this is my nine-year-old son, and we're not leaving until somebody can tell us where we can live and not freeze to death."

== Work as organizer ==
For the past 25 years, Honkala has been a leading advocate for the poor and homeless in America. While still living in Minnesota, she formed the Twin Cities anti-poverty groups "Women, Work and Welfare" and "Up and Out of Poverty Now." In Philadelphia, she co-founded the Kensington Welfare Rights Union (KWRU) and the Poor People's Economic Human Rights Campaign (PPEHRC). She has organized numerous protests, holding marches, demonstrations and setting up tent cities, in the course of which activities she claims to have been arrested for civil disobedience violations more than 200 times. She is known internationally for her work advocating for the rights of poor people in the United States, and has received recognition in numerous publications for her role in bringing attention to issues such as homelessness and home foreclosures and has been called "the protester's protester." Currently based in Philadelphia, she has devoted most of her attention to the rise in home evictions among lower income families.

=== Kensington Welfare Rights Union ===
After moving to Philadelphia with her son in the late 1980s, in 1991 Honkala co-founded KWRU, the Kensington Welfare Rights Union, named after the Kensington area in northern Philadelphia, where Honkala lived. She called KWRU a "Philadelphia based interracial organization of welfare recipients and other poor people." In the winter of 1993, when homeless shelters were full, the organization took over an abandoned Catholic Church to use as a shelter. In late 1994, KWRU broke into and took over vacant HUD homes destined for low-income housing and subsidized rent, although all the inhabitants (which included Honkala herself) were eligible for the housing program under the rules. They chose to ignore the bureaucracy and its delays, particularly the paperwork, paying rent into an escrow account to avoid trespassing charges. This became known as the Underground Railroad Project.

From that time, the volunteers of the organization regularly (and illegally) took over HUD homes to provide accommodations for homeless families. To provide a support system to these families, the organization set up what they called an "'Underground Railroad,' a network of other poor people, students, social workers, doctors and lawyers." Said Honkala: "Stealing slaves out of captivity was against the law ... But it was right. Sometimes the law is wrong. Sometimes you have to appeal to a higher authority."

In the spring of 1994, the Quaker Lace factory (a manufacturer of lace tablecloths) in the Kensington area of Philadelphia burned down, leaving an empty lot. The following summer, Honkala and KWRU constructed a large tent city on the site. Because Philadelphia authorities could not produce documentation establishing who owned the property, it was unable to evict the residents. (Eventually, they were driven out by flooding.) This very public action resulted in a substantial increase in donations to KWRU.

In September 1995, while the tent city was still standing, Honkala staged a protest by camping out for 36 hours, with others from the tent city, on Independence Mall within sight of the Liberty Bell, to make the plight of Philadelphia's homeless visible to residents and tourists next to one of the city's most famous landmarks. Although she argued that she and the others were merely exercising their right to free speech and had not hurt the park, she was cited and later tried for "residing in a park area." She was sentenced to six months' probation and fined $250. In July 1997, she was involved with the Liberty Bell once more, when she led a group on the "March for Our Lives" from the Bell to the United Nations building in New York to protest so-called welfare reform as a violation of the human rights of the poor. This action led directly to the formation of the Poor People's Economic Human Rights Campaign (PPEHRC).

In October 1996, Honkala, with KWRU, staged a sit-in on the floor of the rotunda of Harrisburg's capitol building. The organization created a makeshift "city" that it dubbed "Ridgeville" after Republican Governor Tom Ridge, who had slashed social service benefits. Part of the purpose of the protests was to point out to the homeless the opulence of Gov. Ridge's lifestyle, including the governor's mansion, supported at state expense. The protest was supported by legislators opposed to the cuts, who bought meals for the protesters.

In April 1997, Honkala was arrested on a charge of "defiant trespassing" for attempting to build shacks for homeless families in Philadelphia on an empty industrial lot, though at the time, the shelter system was full and people were living on the streets.

The organization's leaders maintained that "some U.S. laws, such as the Welfare Reform Act of 1996, which limits the amount of time a family can receive federal assistance, violate Articles 23, 25 and 26 of the Universal Declaration of Human Rights. Those articles guarantee, respectively, the right to work for a living wage under humane conditions; the right to adequate food, housing, medical care and social security; and the right to education."

Starting in June 1998, KWRU led the New Freedom Bus Tour, which traveled across the country, gathering stories of human rights violations to present as a petition to the United Nations. "Under the banner 'Freedom from Unemployment, Hunger and Homelessness,' the KWRU team collected additional evidence on the [negative] impact of [welfare reform] and held educational sessions teaching the poor about their economic rights." (A second such bus tour was organized by the PPEHRC in November–December 2002, which traveled to 27 cities to record human rights violations.)

=== Poor People's Economic Human Rights Campaign ===
In the late 1990s, Honkala started another nonprofit, the Poor People's Economic Human Rights Campaign, of which she became National Coordinator. The PPEHRC represents "a network of over 40 poor people's organizations from across the U.S." One commentator has written that the campaign "is the only [national] movement to come out of welfare reform that has been organized by poor people, and not their advocates."

This organization was formed in direct response to the Personal Responsibility and Work Opportunity Reconciliation Act (PRWORA) of 1996 (also known as the Welfare Reform Act), signed into law by Democratic President Bill Clinton, which she and her allies claim hurts recipients of welfare. The organization's mission statement reads, "The Poor People's Economic Human Rights Campaign is committed to uniting the poor across color lines as the leadership base for a broad movement to abolish poverty. We work to accomplish this through advancing economic human rights as named in the universal declaration of human rights — such as the rights to food, housing, health, education, communication and a living wage job."

Part of the purpose of the organization is to make homelessness and the homeless visible, in order to force politicians to act. Honkala claims that the latter prefer that the homeless remain invisible, so they won't have to address the problem. In a speech, Honkala said: "That's what [the authorities] are saying [to you]: 'Go hide! Go be under a bridge, or ... hide under a bench, and we won't arrest you, we won't do anything to you, because you will be quiet!'" As Honkala declared, "When you have nothing, you still have your voice."

In October 1999, PPEHRC organized a month-long March of the Americas, from Washington, DC, to the United Nations in New York. Participants in the march included low-income families from the US, Canada and Latin America. The group "marched 15 miles a day for 32 days, sleeping in tent cities, churches and community centers at night, and holding press conferences and protests in local communities."

In July 2000, a PPEHRC march for the opening day of the Republican Party's National Convention in Philadelphia drew 10,000 homeless and poor people from around the country. (Of the several protest marches during that convention, this was the only one denied a permit by city authorities.)

In November 2000, at the historic Riverside Church in Manhattan in New York City, the PPEHRC held a "Poor People's World Summit to End Poverty," consisting of several hundred activists from some 30 countries, to share "experiences and [work] to build an international movement for economic human rights drawing explicitly on international treaties."

On July 4, 2003, Philadelphia held a celebration for the opening of the National Constitution Center, a new facility housing the Liberty Bell. Poor and homeless families from the city held a peaceful protest to demand their economic rights. "As the demonstrators marched toward Constitution Center single-file, carrying their own mattresses and led by children, park rangers, federal guards, and city police formed lines to prevent the families from approaching. Singing 'We Shall Not Be Moved,' the demonstrators locked arms and refused to leave the sidewalk. Protest leaders Honkala and Galen Tyler had prepared a 'Declaration of Economic Human Rights' to present at the Center. As they moved toward the Center, police moved to stop them, threw them to the ground, handcuffed them, and placed them under arrest ... Honkala was charged with one first-degree felony and four other felony counts. Police officers claimed that Honkala had struck one of them in the chest. However, a video taken at the time clearly shows Honkala carrying a mattress and being struck by the officer ... all the charges were subsequently withdrawn by the District Attorney's office."

In August 2004, Honkala marched with the PPEHRC in New York City (without a permit) to protest President Bush and the Republican National Convention (RNC) and to publicly call for greater attention by the government to the needs of the poor and homeless.

== 2011 campaign for Sheriff of Philadelphia ==
In early 2011, Honkala announced her run for Sheriff of Philadelphia on a "No Evictions" platform, with a campaign slogan of "Keeping families in their homes and protecting the 'hood." When asked why she accepted the Green Party's invitation to run, Honkala said: "I've been involved in too many fights in my life where I thought I was separate from the machine and the corporate money, only to find out later on that I was being used as a pawn for the Democratic Party ... [The Green Party] has a strict policy of no corporate money, which I liked."

As a publicity stunt, Honkala during the campaign rode a horse down Allegheny Avenue in Philadelphia while wearing a white hat resembling a Stetson, in imitation of the image of a Wild West sheriff. During her campaign, Honkala addressed the Occupy Wall Street encampment at Zuccotti Park in Manhattan to express solidarity with the group's anti-foreclosure aims and to ask for help in "occupying Philadelphia" on election day.

She finished in third place with over 10,000 votes.

== 2012 Vice-Presidential campaign ==
=== Nomination ===
On July 11, 2012, Jill Stein, then the presumptive nominee of the Green Party for president in the 2012 U.S. presidential election, announced that she had selected Honkala as her vice-presidential running mate. Said Stein: "My running mate has been on the front lines fighting for the American poor, taking on the banks, taking on foreclosures, standing up for children most at risk."

Stein and Honkala were officially nominated by the Green Party at its national convention in Baltimore on Saturday, July 14.

=== Political activism during campaign ===
On August 1, 2012, Honkala was arrested along with Stein and three others during a sit-in at a Philadelphia bank to protest housing foreclosures by Fannie Mae, on behalf of several city residents struggling to keep their homes. The event began as a PPEHRC protest involving Honkala which Stein, after the former became her running mate, decided to join. The organization demanded that the mortgage company halt foreclosure proceedings against two Philadelphia residents. Fannie Mae executive Zach Oppenheimer had previously promised in writing to meet with the two women at the center of the controversy to negotiate a solution, but no such meeting ever took place. The protestors entered the Fannie Mae building and vowed to stay until Mr. Oppenheimer kept his word. Two lower-level officials met with the group, but when no resolution was obtained, most of the protesters exited the building, leaving only the core group, including Honkala, to be subject to arrest. They were charged with "defiant trespassing" and released the following day.

John Nichols, a commentator for The Nation magazine, compared the position of the Green Party candidates on this issue to the anti-banking rhetoric of President Franklin D. Roosevelt during the New Deal.

She visited the PPEHRC encampment in Tampa, Florida, nicknamed "Romneyville," and strongly supported its plan to protest the 2012 Republican National Convention in that city, beginning on the convention's opening day in August.

On October 16, 2012, Honkala and Stein were arrested after they tried to enter the site of the second presidential debate at Hofstra University.

=== Policy positions ===
Stein and Honkala ran on a platform they call the Green New Deal, "an emergency four-part program of specific solutions for moving America quickly out of crisis into the secure green future." The program's name is inspired by Franklin Roosevelt's New Deal in the Depression era.

The four pillars of the Green New Deal, "the central platform of the Stein/Honkala ticket" are:

1. An Economic Bill Of Rights – a) a Full Employment Program that will create 25 million jobs by implementing a nationally funded, but locally controlled direct employment initiative, replacing unemployment offices with local employment offices; b) defense of worker's rights including the right to a living wage, to a safe workplace, to fair trade, and to organize a union at work without fear of firing or reprisal; c) the right to quality health care which will be achieved through a single-payer Medicare-for-All program; d) the right to a tuition-free, quality, federally funded, local controlled public education system from pre-school through college, and forgiveness of current student loan debt; e) the right to decent affordable housing, including an immediate halt to all foreclosures and evictions; f) the right to accessible and affordable utilities; g) the right to fair taxation that's distributed in proportion to ability to pay.
2. A Green Transition – a) investment in green business by providing grants and low-interest loans to grow green businesses and cooperatives; b) investment in green research by redirecting research funds from fossil fuels and other dead-end industries toward research in wind, solar and geothermal; c) the creation of green jobs by enacting the Full Employment Program which will directly provide 16 million jobs in sustainable energy and energy efficiency.
3. Real Financial Reform – a) relief of the debt overhang holding back the economy by reducing homeowner and student debt burdens; b) democratization of monetary policy to bring about public control of the money supply and credit creation; c) a policy of breaking up oversized banks that are "too big to fail"; d) termination of taxpayer-funded bailouts for banks, insurers, and other financial companies; e) the regulation of all financial derivatives; f) the restoration of the separation of depository commercial banks from speculative investment banks, as was the case under the Glass-Steagall Act; g) a 90% tax on bonuses for bailed out bankers; and h) support for the formation of federal, state, and municipal public-owned banks that function as non-profit utilities.
4. A Functioning Democracy – a) the revocation of corporate personhood by amending our Constitution to make clear that corporations are not persons and money is not speech; b) the protect of our right to vote by supporting the proposed "Right to Vote Amendment"; c) the enactment of the Voter Bill of Rights; d) the commissioning of a thorough review of federal preemption law; e) the creation of a Corporation for Economic Democracy, f) the strengthening of media democracy by expanding federal support for locally owned broadcast media and local print media; g) the protection of our personal liberty and freedoms by, among other things, revoking the Patriot Act; h) a dramatic scaling back of the military–industrial complex.

=== Campaign goals ===
The Stein–Honkala campaign set two immediate goals: to get its candidates on the ballots of as many states as possible before election day (November 6) and to make itself eligible to participate in the televised presidential debates, to take place in October. According to the rules of the Commission on Presidential Debates (CPD), the nonprofit organization that sponsors and produces the presidential and vice-presidential debates, to qualify for a place in the debates the Green Party's presidential slate must a) appear on a sufficient number of state ballots to make it theoretically possible for its candidates to receive enough electoral votes to win the election, and b) receive an average of 15% support from respondents in five selected national polls. The CPD's selection criteria have often been criticized as prohibitively restrictive.

== 2016 Democratic National Convention ==
Honkala planned a novel political protest called a "fart-in" to be staged at the 2016 Democratic National Convention, held in Philadelphia, "to greet the rhetorical flatulence of Hillary Clinton with the real thing". Just prior to the protest, Honkala hosted a "massive bean supper" for Sanders supporters in her home.

== 2017 Pennsylvania House of Representatives campaign ==
On January 31, 2017, Honkala announced she was running for the Pennsylvania House of Representatives in the March 21 special election to replace Leslie Acosta, who was the second state representative for the 197th legislative district to resign on federal fraud charges. She was considered to have more name recognition than her Republican and Democratic opponents. Honkala ran as a write-in candidate against Republican Lucinda Little; there was no Democrat on the ballot in the heavily Democratic district.

Honkala was endorsed by many progressives and organizations including Our Revolution, Progress for All, environmental activist Josh Fox, progressive entertainers Rosario Dawson and Tom Morello, former Director Emeritus of Philaposh (a labor organization) Jim Moran, former Philadelphia Health Commissioner Walter Tsou, the PEOPLE Committee of the AFSCME District Council 47, Philadelphia Neighborhood Networks, the Philadelphia chapter of Socialist Alternative, and other local clergy and leaders.

In March 2017, Honkala lost to Democratic write-in Emilio Vazquez. However, this election went under investigation by the Philadelphia District Attorney's Office and the Pennsylvania Attorney General. Honkala, alongside the Green Party of Pennsylvania, Lucinda Little (the Republican candidate), and the State and City Republican parties filed a lawsuit in United States District Court against Emilio Vazquez, the Philadelphia Democratic Committee, Philadelphia City Commissioners, PA Secretary of State Cortes, and the State's Bureau of Commissions, Elections, and Legislation. The lawsuit alleges widespread election fraud and voter intimidation on the part of Vazquez and the Philadelphia Democratic Committee, and failure to properly supervise the elections for the other defendants.

Claims in the federal lawsuit include electioneering inside the polling place, money exchange between Democratic poll workers and election officials, a ballot box being at Vazquez's "victory" party, tables set up outside by Democratic poll works made to look like voter sign-in tables, election workers asking people who they are voting for, Democratic ward leaders handling the voting machines, Vazquez meeting with election officials on election day inside of the polling place, and other claims. Despite the investigation, Vazquez was officially sworn in as a member of the Pennsylvania state House of Representatives on April 5, 2017.

== Criticism ==
Honkala has been a controversial figure throughout her career as a protester and organizer. Feather O. Houstoun, a former secretary of the Pennsylvania Department of Public Welfare under Republican governors Tom Ridge and Mark Schweiker, said "She has not been working, rolling up her sleeves on issues like Community Legal Services does. She has never availed herself [of] that opportunity, while other groups have." John Kromer, a former director of the city's office of Housing and Community Development, faxed a five-page letter to KWRU, in which he claimed that the group was actually preventing its poor followers from obtaining housing through its tactic of breaking into vacant homes, rather than utilizing established organizations. He wrote: "No good can come of an organization-building strategy, which is based on misleading poor people or preventing them from obtaining access to available assistance and support." Honkala admits that the group failed to rehabilitate any of the homes illegally taken, but asserts that the group was instrumental in helping 500 formerly homeless people find housing through existing programs. Honkala added: "I get criticized on a regular basis for not being a team player. But I have no qualms about holding a protest tomorrow at anybody's offices if they are denying anybody the basic necessities of life. You're not supposed to do that in Philadelphia."

She has been criticized for her confrontational tactics in dealing with the authorities. Author David Zucchino described Honkala's behavior at the first Liberty Bell protest as follows:

Cheri loved to make people uncomfortable ... She wanted people to squirm and recoil when they saw poor people. She was convinced that America sought desperately to keep its poor out of sight so as not to be reminded of the social policies she believed exacerbated poverty. If the country was going to turn its back on the poor, she was not going to let anyone feel ambivalent about it. She would assault people with her high-pitched nasal voice—in public demonstrations, in confrontations with elected officials, in media interviews, and in front of a ragged tent on Independence Mall.

During the church takeover incident, William Parshall, the deputy city managing director, known as the Philadelphia "housing czar," was asked whether Honkala's in-your-face tactics "made his job difficult." Parshall replied that he was far more concerned with such pending problems as national and state welfare cuts. He added, "The question is, what are we going to do about it? That's the question Cheri should be asking."

Zucchino in his book details many confrontations between Honkala and the authorities, but also instances in which she reached a mutually satisfactory compromise with them. For example, during the first Liberty Bell protest, she negotiated successfully with park authorities to leave the site without the necessity of admitting guilt or of enduring mass arrests.

== Recognition ==
=== Honkala in the media ===
Honkala and her activities on behalf of the poor have been profiled many times in various media.

==== In print and photography ====
Honkala was one of two women profiled in Pulitzer Prize-winning journalist David Zucchino's book, The Myth of the Welfare Queen (1999). According to one review, Honkala, as depicted in the book, "helps create a tent city to protest welfare cuts, joins the occupation of an abandoned church and the takeover by protesters of empty houses owned by HUD. She tirelessly seeks publicity for her cause, battles with bureaucrats, and rallies and comforts fellow protesters."

She was the subject of Chapter 6, "Using Economic Human Rights in the Movement to End Poverty: The Kensington Welfare Rights Union and the Poor People's Economic Human Right Campaign" by Mary Bricker-Jenkins, Carrie Young and Honkala, in the book Challenges in Human Rights: A Social Work Perspective, edited by Elizabeth Reichert (2007). She was also briefly profiled in Katherine Martin's book Women of Courage: Inspiring Stories from the Women who Lived Them (1999).

Since the mid-1990s Honkala has been extensively documented by photographer Harvey Finkle. A YouTube video was created consisting of many of Finkle's photos of Honkala and of other poor people. She also wrote the introduction to Finkle's book of photographs of the urban poor, Urban Nomads: A Poor People's Movement (1997). One of the last photos taken by the late photographer Richard Avedon (1923–2004) was a portrait of Honkala for the series Democracy 2004, which appeared in an October 2004 issue of The New Yorker magazine.

Interviews and articles on Honkala have appeared in numerous print and online publications, including The Village Voice, The Philadelphia Inquirer, Philadelphia Weekly, Yes! magazine, Salon, Truthdig and The Nation.

==== On video ====
Honkala has been repeatedly and prominently featured in the work of documentary filmmakers Peter Kinoy and Pamela Yates, the latter a co-director of the award-winning film When the Mountains Tremble. Their work with Honkala has included Takeover (1990), a film, financed by Bruce Springsteen (during the making of which they first met Honkala), "about homeless women that was planned as the first in a series on 'heroes of the new American depression;'" Poverty Outlaw (1997), the story of a homeless woman "who must break the law to survive" and which tells the story of the birth and growth of the KWRU; Outriders (1999), about the New Freedom Bus Tour; and The Battle for Broad (2000), about KWRU's and PPEHRC's march during the Republican National Convention in 2000 in Philadelphia. (Living Broke in Broke Times is a compilation film condensing Takeover, Poverty Outlaw and Outriders.)

In the 1990s, the Television Trust for the Environment, as part of its "Life" series, broadcast on BBC World News a short documentary on Honkala and the KWRU called The Philadelphia Story. In the profile, Honkala talks about gated communities and her complex feelings about the state of the country.

The independent film, August in the Empire State, directed by Keefe Murren and Gabriel Rhodes, profiles several persons during the 2004 Republican National Convention, including Honkala, who is depicted leading her PPEHRC march against the RNC. In the film, Honkala discusses her commitment to the principle of Gandhian nonviolent resistance.

In February 2008, on its flagship public affairs program, People & Power, Al Jazeera English ran a video profile of Honkala entitled "Homeless Hero," depicting a campaign by the Nashville Homeless Power Project, which had invited Honkala to that city to organize "the first major homeless action in the history of Tennessee." The video shows the construction of an encampment to confront Nashville's mayor, during his budget address, with the issue of homelessness. (The mayor never appeared.)

On September 7, 2012, Honkala was a guest of Bill Moyers for the program Moyers & Company, "Challenging Power, Changing Politics", along with her Green Party Presidential running mate, Jill Stein, and Vermont Senator Bernie Sanders.

=== Honors and awards ===
Honkala has been the recipient of numerous honors and awards:

- Philadelphia Magazine – list of the 100 Most Powerful Philadelphians
- Philadelphia Weekly – "Woman of the Year" (1997)
- Ms. Magazine – Woman of the Year (2001)
- Bread and Roses Human Rights Award
- Pennsylvania Association of Social Workers' Public Citizen of the Year
- Front Line Defenders (The International Foundation for the Protection of Human Rights Defenders), a Dublin-based human rights organization, named her one of the "12 most endangered" activists in America
- Mother Jones magazine – Hellraiser of the Month (April 2005)

In addition, the organization Honkala co-founded, the Kensington Welfare Rights Union, was a 1999 co-winner (with Dr. Juan Garcés) of the prestigious Letelier-Moffitt Human Rights Award, given by the Institute for Policy Studies.

In January 2004, Honkala was invited to speak at the annual World Social Forum (WSF) in Mumbai, India on the subject of the "War against the Homeless." In 2006, Honkala again addressed the WSF, this time in Caracas, Venezuela, to discuss poverty and homelessness in the United States, information that many of her listeners do not often receive from mainstream U.S. media sources.

== Electoral history ==
Pennsylvania House of Representatives, District 197, Special Election, 2017
Party	Candidate	Votes	%	±%
Democratic	Emilio Vazquez (write-in)	1,964	80.4	n/a
Green	Cheri Honkala (write-in)	280	11.8	n/a
Republican	Lucinda Little	198	8.1	n/a
Democratic hold		Swing		

== Personal life ==
Honkala in 1990 married a Philadelphia-based union official, Bob Brown, whom she had met at a convention the previous year. They divorced not long afterwards.

Honkala is the mother of the actor and director Mark Webber (born 1980). Webber has supported his mother's causes in a number of ways, including holding benefit events, such as art auctions, on her behalf.

Honkala is also the mother of Guillermo Santos (born 2002).

Party political offices
Preceded by Rosa Clemente	Green nominee for Vice President of the United States; 2012	Succeeded by Ajamu Baraka
