= 1998 United States House of Representatives elections in Pennsylvania =

- November 3, 1998

All 21 Pennsylvania seats to the United States House of Representatives
	Majority party	Minority party
Party	Democratic	Republican
Last election	11	10
Seats won	11	10
Seat change	Steady	Steady
Popular vote	1,380,834	1,472,161
Percentage	47.68%	50.84%
Swing	▼3.82%	▲3.64%

Democratic hold Democratic gain
Republican hold Republican gain
Democratic
40–50%
50–60%
60–70%
70–80%
80–90%
>90%
Republican
50–60%
60–70%
70–80%
80–90%
>90%

The 1998 United States House of Representatives elections in Pennsylvania were held on November 3, 1998, to elect the twenty-one members of Pennsylvania's delegation to the United States House of Representatives. The elections coincided with other elections to the House of Representatives, elections to the United States Senate, and various state and local elections. Primary elections were held May 19, 1998.

== Overview ==
United States House of Representatives elections in Pennsylvania, 1998
Party	Votes	Percentage	Seats Before	Seats After	+/–
Democratic	1,380,834	47.68%	11	11	0
Republican	1,472,161	50.84%	10	10	0
Green	17,734	0.61%	0	0	0
Libertarian	10,112	0.35%	0	0	0
Reform	6,227	0.22%	0	0	0
Constitution	3,917	0.14%	0	0	0
Socialist Workers	1,625	0.06%	0	0	0
Write-in	1,316	0.05%	0	0	0
Natural Law	1,022	0.04%	0	0	0
Socialist Workers Campaign	964	0.03%	0	0	0
Totals	2,895,912	100.00%	21	21	–

== Match-up summary ==
District	Democratic		Republican		Others		Total		Result
District	Votes	%	Votes	%	Votes	%	Votes	%	Result
District 1	77,788	81.16%	15,898	16.59%	2,162	2.26%	95,848	100.00%	Democratic hold
District 2	102,763	86.53%	16,001	13.47%	0	0.00%	118,764	100.00%	Democratic hold
District 3	66,270	59.35%	45,390	40.65%	0	0.00%	111,660	100.00%	Democratic hold
District 4	103,183	63.82%	58,485	36.17%	17	0.01%	161,685	100.00%	Democratic hold
District 5	0	0.00%	99,502	84.81%	17,821	15.19%	117,323	100.00%	Republican hold
District 6	85,374	61.00%	54,579	39.00%	0	0.00%	139,953	100.00%	Democratic hold
District 7	46,920	28.20%	119,491	71.80%	0	0.00%	166,411	100.00%	Republican hold
District 8	48,320	32.60%	93,697	63.22%	6,183	4.17%	148,200	100.00%	Republican hold
District 9	0	0.00%	125,409	99.51%	618	0.49%	126,027	100.00%	Republican hold
District 10	83,760	48.40%	84,275	48.70%	5,021	2.90%	173,056	100.00%	Republican hold
District 11	88,933	66.83%	44,123	33.16%	9	0.01%	133,065	100.00%	Democratic hold
District 12	100,528	68.49%	46,239	31.50%	13	0.01%	146,780	100.00%	Democratic hold
District 13	95,105	51.55%	85,915	46.57%	3,470	1.88%	184,490	100.00%	Democratic gain
District 14	83,355	60.52%	52,745	38.29%	1,636	1.19%	137,736	100.00%	Democratic hold
District 15	66,930	45.01%	81,755	54.98%	21	0.01%	148,706	100.00%	Republican gain
District 16	40,092	29.46%	95,979	70.53%	14	0.01%	136,085	100.00%	Republican hold
District 17	0	0.00%	114,931	99.85%	176	0.15%	115,107	100.00%	Republican hold
District 18	98,363	67.68%	46,945	32.30%	29	0.02%	145,337	100.00%	Democratic hold
District 19	40,674	28.55%	96,284	67.57%	5,531	3.88%	142,489	100.00%	Republican hold
District 20	97,885	99.81%	0	0.00%	190	0.19%	98,075	100.00%	Democratic hold
District 21	54,591	36.61%	94,518	63.39%	6	0.00%	149,115	100.00%	Republican hold
Total	1,380,834	47.68%	1,472,161	50.84%	42,917	1.48%	2,895,912	100.00%	

Popular vote
Republican	50.84%
Democratic	47.68%
Other	1.48%

House seats
Democratic	52.38%
Republican	47.62%

== District 1 ==
1998 Pennsylvania's 1st congressional district election
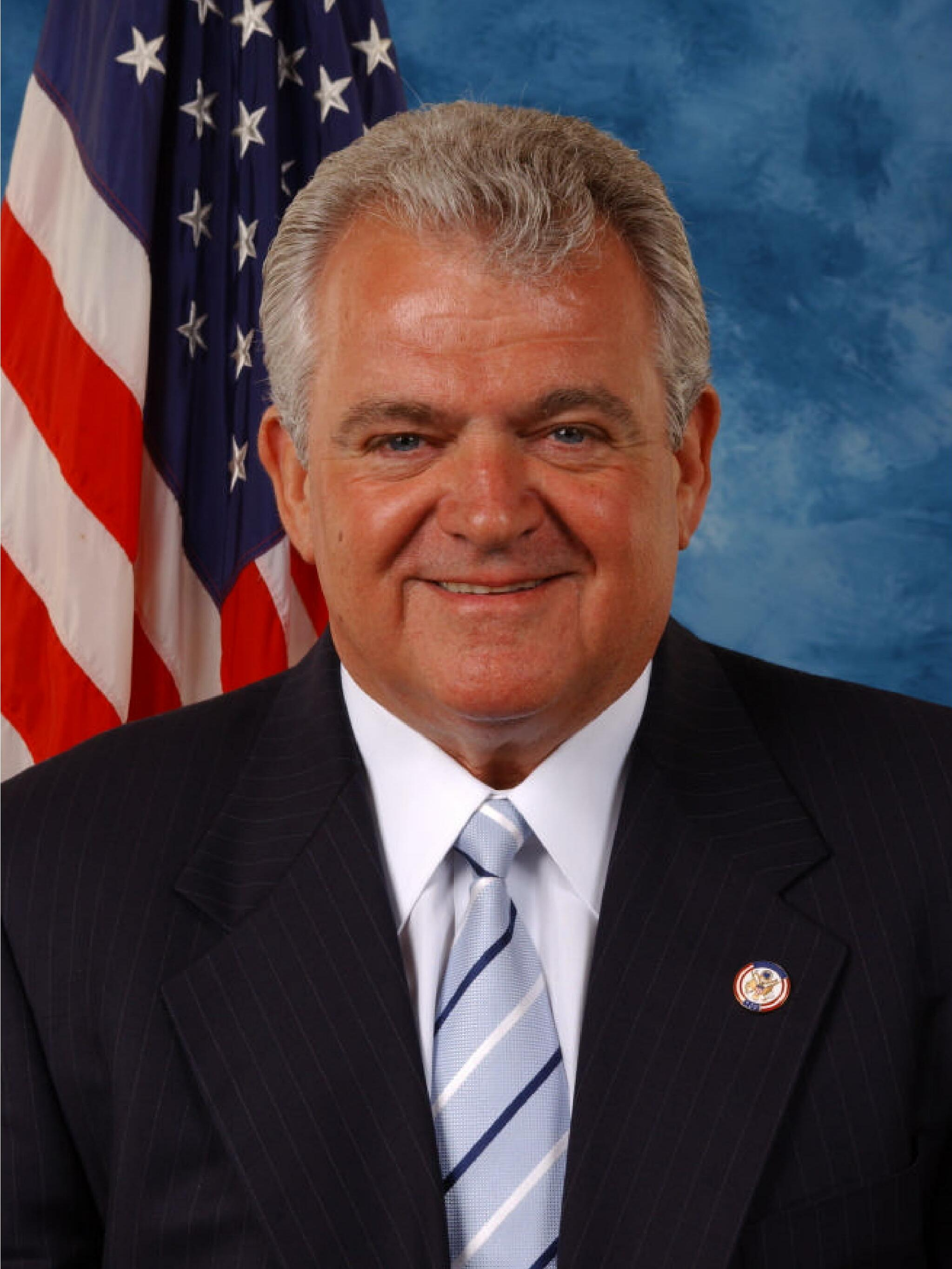

Nominee	Bob Brady	William Harrison
Party	Democratic	Republican
Popular vote	77,788	15,898
Percentage	81.16%	16.59%
U.S. Representative before election
Bob Brady
Democratic
Elected U.S. Representative
Bob Brady
Democratic

U.S. Representative Thomas M. Foglietta was appointed as United States Ambassador to Italy by President Bill Clinton in 1997. Brady, chair of the Philadelphia Democratic Party and a ward leader, won a special election held on May 19, 1998, with 74% of the vote.

=== Democratic primary ===
==== Candidates ====
===== Nominee =====
- Bob Brady, incumbent U.S. Representative

==== Eliminated in primary ====
- Andrew Carn, member of the Pennsylvania House of Representatives
- Sam Jones
- Dennis Morrison-Wesley

==== Primary results ====
Democratic primary results
Party	Candidate	Votes	%
Democratic	Bob Brady (incumbent)	23,181	63.89
Democratic	Andrew Carn	8,061	22.22
Democratic	Dennis Morrison-Wesley	4,052	11.17
Democratic	Sam Jones	986	2.72
Total votes		36,280	100.00

=== Republican primary ===
==== Candidates ====
===== Nominee =====
- William Harrison

==== Primary results ====
Republican primary results
Party	Candidate	Votes	%
Republican	William Harrison	4,768	100.00
Total votes		4,768	100.00

=== General election ===
Pennsylvania's 1st congressional district, 1998
Party	Candidate	Votes	%
Democratic	Bob Brady (incumbent)	77,788	81.16
Republican	William M. Harrison	15,898	16.59
Libertarian	John Featherman	1,198	1.25
Socialist Workers Campaign	Nancy Cole	964	1.01
Total votes		95,848	100.00
Democratic hold			

==== By county (Note: Vote totals summed from the precinct data file published by the Pennsylvania Department of State do not match the results officially published by the U.S. House of Representatives.) ====
County	Bob Brady Democratic		William Harrison Republican		John Featherman Libertarian		Nancy Cole SWC		Margin		Total votes cast
County	#	%	#	%	#	%	#	%	#	%	Total votes cast
Delaware	7,057	48.24%	7,198	49.20%	212	1.45%	163	1.11%	−141	−0.96%	14,630
Philadelphia	70,571	86.96%	8,787	10.83%	986	1.22%	806	0.99%	61,784	76.13%	81,150
Totals	77,628	81.05%	15,985	16.69%	1,198	1.25%	969	1.01%	61,643	64.36%	95,780

== District 2 ==
1998 Pennsylvania's 2nd congressional district election
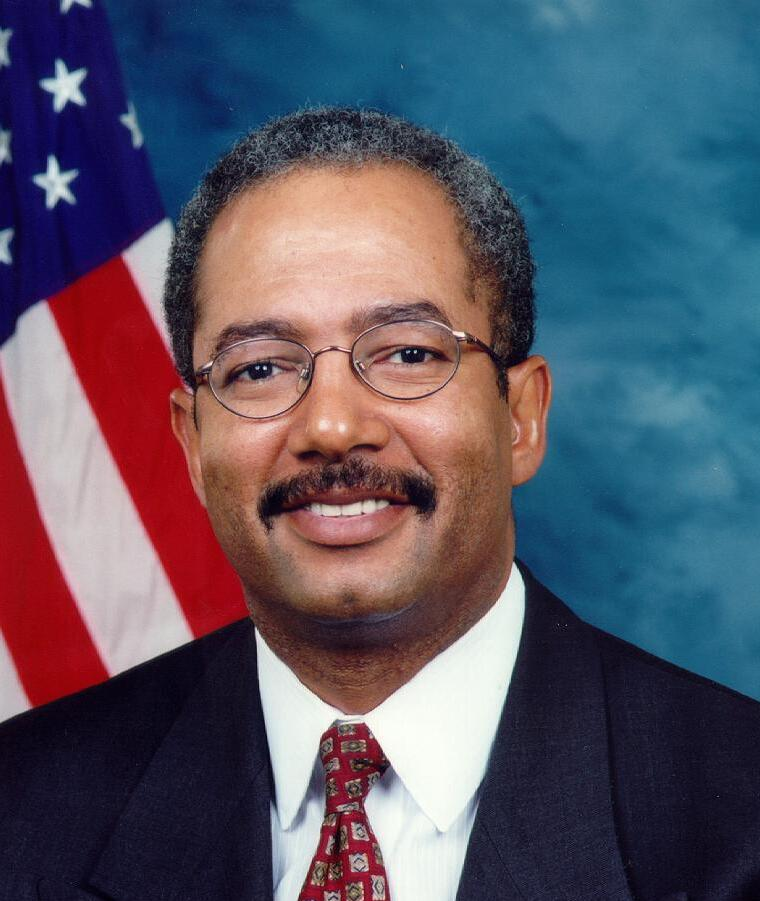

Nominee	Chaka Fattah	Anne Marie Mulligan
Party	Democratic	Republican
Popular vote	102,763	16,001
Percentage	86.53%	13.47%
U.S. Representative before election
Chaka Fattah
Democratic
Elected U.S. Representative
Chaka Fattah
Democratic

=== Democratic primary ===
==== Candidates ====
===== Nominee =====
- Chaka Fattah, incumbent U.S. Representative

==== Primary results ====
Democratic primary results
Party	Candidate	Votes	%
Democratic	Chaka Fattah (incumbent)	35,761	100.00
Total votes		35,761	100.00

=== Republican primary ===
==== Candidates ====
===== Nominee =====
- Anne Marie Mulligan

==== Primary results ====
Republican primary results
Party	Candidate	Votes	%
Republican	Anne Marie Mulligan	3,566	100.00
Total votes		3,566	100.00

=== General election ===
Pennsylvania's 2nd congressional district, 1998
Party	Candidate	Votes	%
Democratic	Chaka Fattah (incumbent)	102,763	86.53
Republican	Anne Marie Mulligan	16,001	13.47
Total votes		118,764	100.00
Democratic hold			

==== By county ====
County	Chaka Fattah Democratic		Anne Marie Mulligan Republican		Margin		Total votes cast
County	#	%	#	%	#	%	Total votes cast
Delaware	4,975	62.68%	2,962	37.32%	2,013	25.36%	7,937
Philadelphia	97,784	88.18%	13,103	11.82%	84,681	76.36%	110,887
Totals	102,759	86.48%	16,065	13.52%	86,694	72.96%	118,824

== District 3 ==
1998 Pennsylvania's 3rd congressional district election
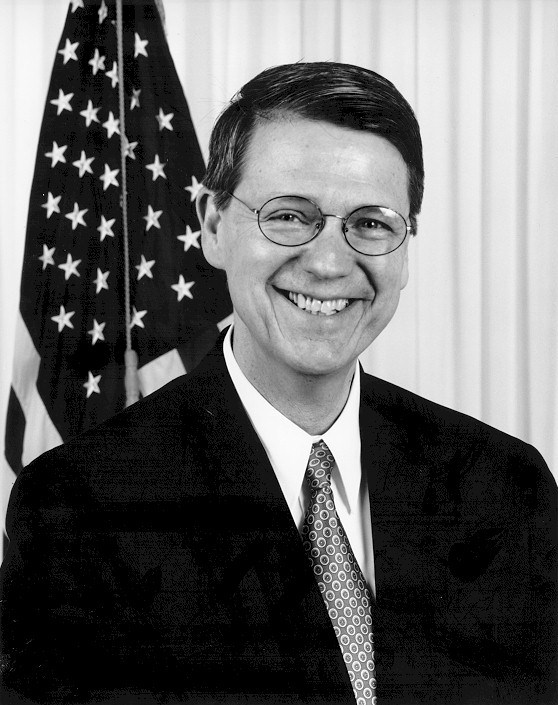

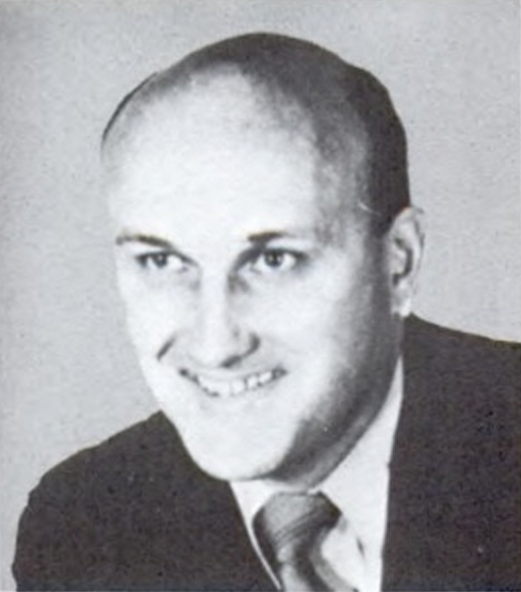
Nominee	Robert Borski	Charles F. Dougherty
Party	Democratic	Republican
Popular vote	66,270	45,390
Percentage	59.35%	40.65%
U.S. Representative before election
Robert Borski
Democratic
Elected U.S. Representative
Robert Borski
Democratic

=== Democratic primary ===
==== Candidates ====
===== Nominee =====
- Robert Borski, incumbent U.S. Representative

===== Eliminated in primary =====
- John R. Kates, candidate for Congress in 1994 and 1996

==== Primary results ====
Democratic primary results
Party	Candidate	Votes	%
Democratic	Robert Borski (incumbent)	20,989	86.93
Democratic	John R. Kates	3,157	13.07
Total votes		24,146	100.00

=== Republican primary ===
==== Candidates ====
===== Nominee =====
- Charles F. Dougherty, former U.S. Representative (1979–1983)

==== Primary results ====
Republican primary results
Party	Candidate	Votes	%
Republican	Charles F. Dougherty	10,713	100.00
Total votes		10,713	100.00

=== General election ===
Pennsylvania's 3rd congressional district, 1998
Party	Candidate	Votes	%
Democratic	Robert Borski (incumbent)	66,270	59.35
Republican	Charles F. Dougherty	45,390	40.65
Total votes		111,660	100.00
Democratic hold			

==== By county ====
County	Robert Borski Democratic		Charles F. Dougherty Republican		Margin		Total votes cast
County	#	%	#	%	#	%	Total votes cast
Philadelphia	66,270	59.35%	45,390	40.65%	20,880	18.70%	111,660
Totals	66,270	59.35%	45,390	40.65%	20,880	18.70%	111,660

== District 4 ==
1998 Pennsylvania's 4th congressional district election
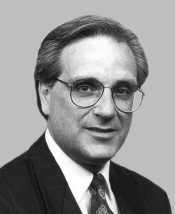

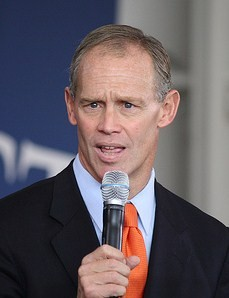
Nominee	Ron Klink	Mike Turzai
Party	Democratic	Republican
Popular vote	103,183	58,485
Percentage	63.82%	36.17%
U.S. Representative before election
Ron Klink
Democratic
Elected U.S. Representative
Ron Klink
Democratic

=== Democratic primary ===
==== Candidates ====
===== Nominee =====
- Ron Klink, incumbent U.S. Representative

==== Primary results ====
Democratic primary results
Party	Candidate	Votes	%
Democratic	Ron Klink (incumbent)	35,652	100.00
Total votes		35,652	100.00

=== Republican primary ===
==== Candidates ====
===== Nominee =====
- Mike Turzai, lawyer and former assistant district attorney for Allegheny County

===== Eliminated in primary =====
- Paul T. Adametz, Republican nominee in 1996
- David F. Miller

==== Primary results ====
Republican primary results
Party	Candidate	Votes	%
Republican	Mike Turzai	12,178	54.27
Republican	David F. Miller	5,489	24.46
Republican	Paul T. Adametz	4,772	21.27
Total votes		22,439	100.00

=== General election ===
Pennsylvania's 4th congressional district, 1998
Party	Candidate	Votes	%
Democratic	Ron Klink (incumbent)	103,183	63.82
Republican	Mike Turzai	58,485	36.17
Write-in		17	0.01
Total votes		161,685	100.00
Democratic hold			

==== By county ====
County	Ron Klink Democratic		Mike Turzai Republican		Write-in		Margin		Total votes cast
County	#	%	#	%	#	%	#	%	Total votes cast
Allegheny	14,194	60.13%	9,413	39.87%	0	0.00%	4,781	20.26%	23,607
Beaver	36,820	70.24%	15,532	29.63%	65	0.12%	21,288	40.61%	52,417
Butler	7,492	48.79%	7,862	51.20%	2	0.01%	–370	–2.41%	15,356
Lawrence	17,157	65.06%	9,213	34.94%	0	0.00%	7,944	30.12%	26,370
Westmoreland	27,520	62.57%	16,465	37.43%	0	0.00%	11,055	25.14%	43,985
Totals	103,183	63.80%	58,485	36.16%	67	0.04%	44,698	27.64%	161,735

== District 5 ==
1998 Pennsylvania's 5th congressional district election
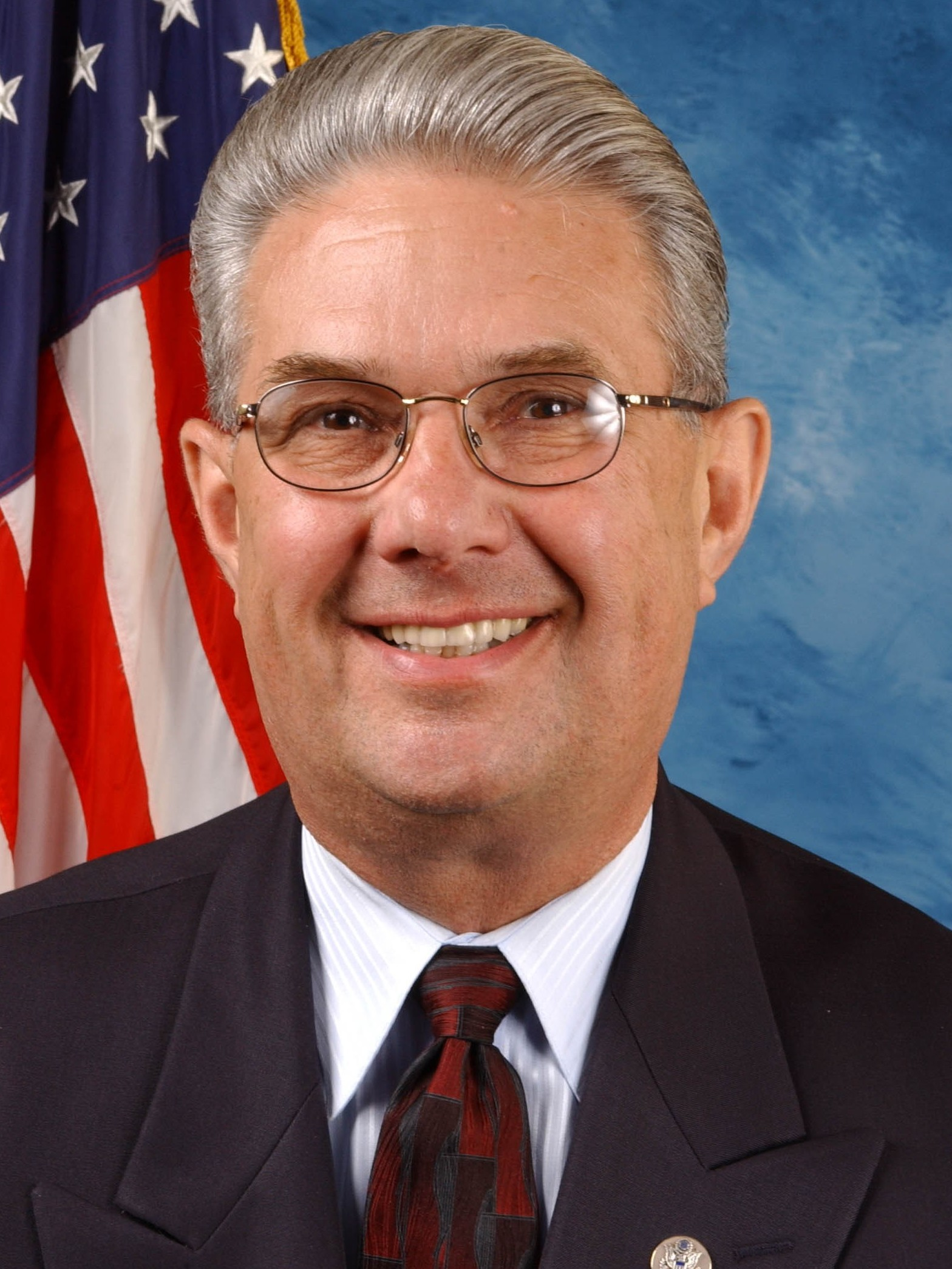

Nominee	John Peterson	William Belitskus
Party	Republican	Green
Popular vote	99,502	17,734
Percentage	84.81%	15.12%
U.S. Representative before election
John Peterson
Republican
Elected U.S. Representative
John Peterson
Republican

=== Republican primary ===
==== Candidates ====
===== Nominee =====
- John Peterson, incumbent U.S. Representative

==== Primary results ====
Republican primary results
Party	Candidate	Votes	%
Republican	John Peterson (incumbent)	28,022	100.00
Total votes		28,022	100.00

=== General election ===
Pennsylvania's 5th congressional district, 1998
Party	Candidate	Votes	%
Republican	John Peterson (incumbent)	99,502	84.81
Green	William M. Belitskus	17,734	15.12
Write-in		87	0.07
Total votes		117,323	100.00
Republican hold			

==== By county ====
County	John Peterson Republican		William Belitskus Green		Write-in		Margin		Total votes cast
County	#	%	#	%	#	%	#	%	Total votes cast
Armstrong	166	91.21%	16	8.79%	0	0.00%	150	82.42%	182
Cameron	1,214	87.72%	170	12.28%	0	0.00%	1,044	75.44%	1,384
Centre	17,425	74.03%	6,112	25.97%	0	0.00%	11,313	48.06%	23,537
Clarion	7,760	86.04%	1,259	13.96%	0	0.00%	6,501	72.08%	9,019
Clearfield	7	100.00%	0	0.00%	0	0.00%	7	100.00%	7
Clinton	4,920	81.40%	1,124	18.60%	0	0.00%	3,796	62.80%	6,044
Crawford	4,092	94.66%	230	5.32%	1	0.02%	3,862	89.34%	4,323
Elk	6,663	85.52%	1,112	14.27%	16	0.21%	5,551	71.25%	7,791
Forest	1,224	85.18%	213	14.82%	0	0.00%	1,011	70.36%	1,437
Jefferson	8,589	88.16%	1,153	11.84%	0	0.00%	7,436	76.32%	9,742
Lycoming	2,962	88.63%	380	11.37%	0	0.00%	2,582	77.26%	3,342
McKean	7,571	91.77%	678	8.22%	1	0.01%	6,893	83.55%	8,250
Potter	3,674	92.57%	293	7.38%	2	0.05%	3,381	85.19%	3,969
Tioga	7,580	87.27%	1,106	12.73%	0	0.00%	6,474	74.54%	8,686
Union	5,990	84.06%	1,136	15.94%	0	0.00%	4,854	68.12%	7,126
Venango	11,522	85.04%	2,001	14.77%	26	0.19%	9,521	70.27%	13,549
Warren	8,142	91.32%	751	8.42%	23	0.26%	7,391	82.90%	8,916
Totals	99,501	84.82%	17,734	15.12%	69	0.06%	81,767	69.71%	117,304

== District 6 ==
1998 Pennsylvania's 6th congressional district election
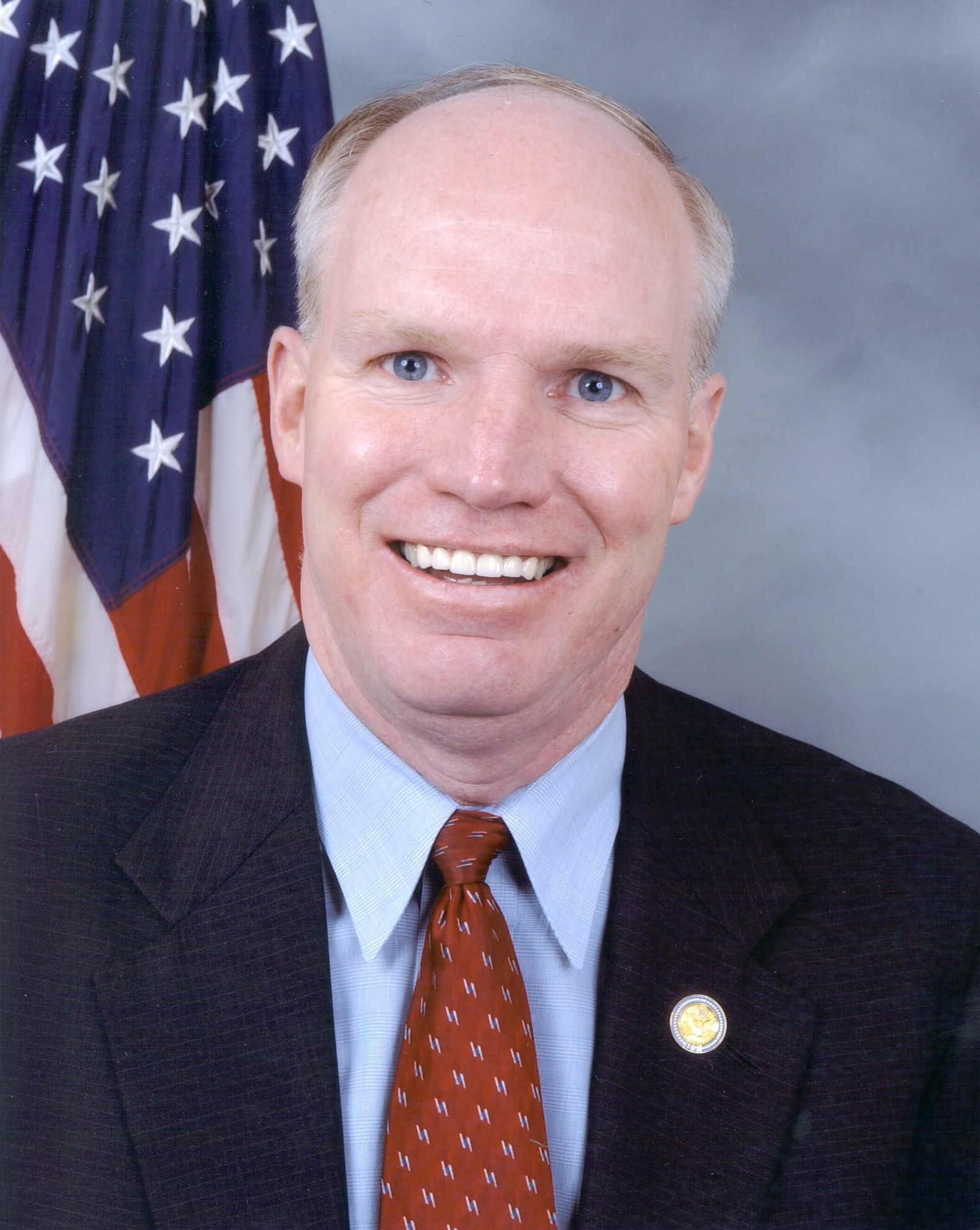

Nominee	Tim Holden	John Meckley
Party	Democratic	Republican
Popular vote	85,374	54,579
Percentage	61.00%	39.00%
U.S. Representative before election
Tim Holden
Democratic
Elected U.S. Representative
Tim Holden
Democratic

=== Democratic primary ===
==== Candidates ====
===== Nominee =====
- Tim Holden, incumbent U.S. Representative

==== Primary results ====
Democratic primary results
Party	Candidate	Votes	%
Democratic	Tim Holden (incumbent)	20,758	100.00
Total votes		20,758	100.00

=== Republican primary ===
==== Candidates ====
===== Nominee =====
- John Meckley

==== Primary results ====
Republican primary results
Party	Candidate	Votes	%
Republican	John Meckley	18,416	100.00
Total votes		18,416	100.00

=== General election ===
Pennsylvania's 6th congressional district, 1998
Party	Candidate	Votes	%
Democratic	Tim Holden (incumbent)	85,374	61.00
Republican	John Meckley	54,579	39.00
Total votes		139,953	100.00
Democratic hold			

==== By county ====
County	Tim Holden Democratic		John Meckley Republican		Write-in		Margin		Total votes cast
County	#	%	#	%	#	%	#	%	Total votes cast
Berks	46,169	57.93%	33,509	42.04%	21	0.03%	12,660	15.89%	79,699
Montgomery	2,759	62.00%	1,691	38.00%	0	0.00%	1,068	24.00%	4,450
Northumberland	4,184	38.23%	6,761	61.77%	0	0.00%	–2,577	–23.54%	10,945
Schuylkill	32,262	71.89%	12,618	28.11%	0	0.00%	19,644	43.78%	44,880
Totals	85,374	60.99%	54,579	38.99%	21	0.02%	30,795	22.00%	139,974

== District 7 ==
1998 Pennsylvania's 7th congressional district election
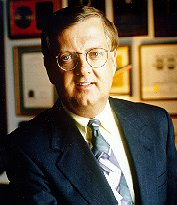

Nominee	Curt Weldon	Martin D'Urso
Party	Republican	Democratic
Popular vote	119,491	46,920
Percentage	71.80%	28.20%
U.S. Representative before election
Curt Weldon
Republican
Elected U.S. Representative
Curt Weldon
Republican

=== Democratic primary ===
==== Candidates ====
===== Nominee =====
- Martin J. D'Urso

==== Primary results ====
Democratic primary results
Party	Candidate	Votes	%
Democratic	Martin J. D'Urso	6,536	100.00
Total votes		6,536	100.00

=== Republican primary ===
==== Candidates ====
===== Nominee =====
- Curt Weldon, incumbent U.S. Representative

==== Primary results ====
Republican primary results
Party	Candidate	Votes	%
Republican	Curt Weldon (incumbent)	34,760	100.00
Total votes		34,760	100.00

=== General election ===
Pennsylvania's 7th congressional district, 1998
Party	Candidate	Votes	%
Republican	Curt Weldon (incumbent)	119,491	71.80
Democratic	Martin J. D'Urso	46,920	28.20
Total votes		166,411	100.00
Republican hold			

==== By county ====
County	Curt Weldon Republican		Martin D'Urso Democratic		Write-in		Margin		Total votes cast
County	#	%	#	%	#	%	#	%	Total votes cast
Chester	20,748	72.34%	7,899	27.54%	36	0.13%	12,849	44.80%	28,683
Delaware	93,023	72.19%	35,835	27.81%	0	0.00%	57,188	44.38%	128,858
Montgomery	5,720	64.23%	3,186	35.77%	0	0.00%	2,534	28.46%	8,906
Totals	119,491	71.79%	46,920	28.19%	36	0.02%	72,571	43.60%	166,447

== District 8 ==
1998 Pennsylvania's 8th congressional district election
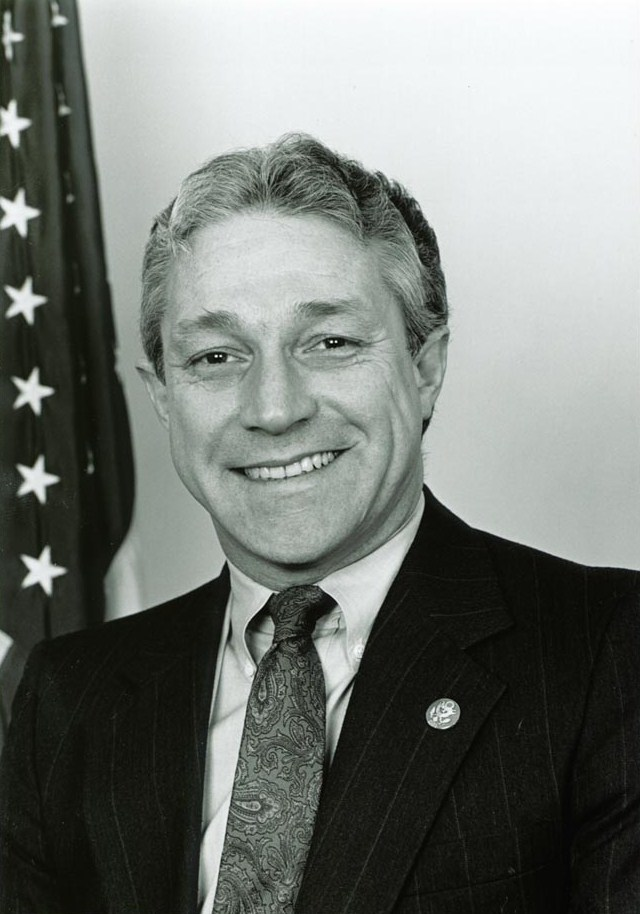

Nominee	Jim Greenwood	Bill Tuthill
Party	Republican	Democratic
Popular vote	93,697	48,320
Percentage	63.22%	32.60%
U.S. Representative before election
Jim Greenwood
Republican
Elected U.S. Representative
Jim Greenwood
Republican

=== Democratic primary ===
==== Candidates ====
===== Nominee =====
- Bill Tuthill

==== Primary results ====
Democratic primary results
Party	Candidate	Votes	%
Democratic	Bill Tuthill	9,030	100.00
Total votes		9,030	100.00

=== Republican primary ===
==== Candidates ====
===== Nominee =====
- Jim Greenwood, incumbent U.S. Representative

===== Eliminated in primary =====
- Joseph P. Schiaffino

==== Primary results ====
Republican primary results
Party	Candidate	Votes	%
Republican	Jim Greenwood (incumbent)	21,347	67.44
Republican	Joseph P. Schiaffino	10,305	32.56
Total votes		31,652	100.00

=== General election ===
Pennsylvania's 8th congressional district, 1998
Party	Candidate	Votes	%
Republican	Jim Greenwood (incumbent)	93,697	63.22
Democratic	Bill Tuthill	48,320	32.60
Constitution	Scott Wolfertz	3,917	2.64
Reform	James R. Blair	1,229	0.83
Natural Law	Carolyn Boyce	1,022	0.69
Write-in		15	0.01
Total votes		148,200	100.00
Republican hold			

==== By county ====
County	Jim Greenwood Republican		Bill Tuthill Democratic		Scott Wolfertz Constitution		James Blair Reform		Carolyn Boyce Natural Law		Margin		Total votes cast
County	#	%	#	%	#	%	#	%	#	%	#	%	Total votes cast
Bucks	88,826	62.83%	46,614	32.97%	3,789	2.68%	1,168	0.83%	976	0.69%	42,212	29.86%	141,373
Montgomery	4,571	70.37%	1,706	26.26%	128	1.97%	52	0.80%	39	0.60%	2,865	44.11%	6,496
Totals	93,397	63.16%	48,320	32.68%	3,917	2.65%	1,220	0.83%	1,015	0.69%	45,077	30.48%	147,869

== District 9 ==
1998 Pennsylvania's 9th congressional district election
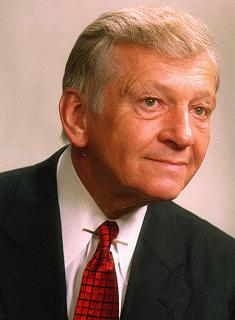
Nominee	Bud Shuster
Party	Republican
Popular vote	125,409
Percentage	99.51%
U.S. Representative before election
Bud Shuster
Republican
Elected U.S. Representative
Bud Shuster
Republican

=== Democratic primary ===
==== Candidates ====
===== Nominee =====
- Monte Kemmler, Democratic nominee for the 1996 election (Note: Dropped out after winning the primary.)

==== Primary results ====
Democratic primary results
Party	Candidate	Votes	%
Democratic	Monte Kemmler	5,830	100.00
Total votes		5,830	100.00

=== Republican primary ===
==== Candidates ====
===== Nominee =====
- Bud Shuster, incumbent U.S. Representative

==== Primary results ====
Republican primary results
Party	Candidate	Votes	%
Republican	Bud Shuster (incumbent)	24,768	100.00
Total votes		24,768	100.00

=== General election ===
Pennsylvania's 9th congressional district, 1998
Party	Candidate	Votes	%
Republican	Bud Shuster (incumbent)	125,409	99.51
Write-in		618	0.49
Total votes		126,027	100.00
Republican hold			

==== By county ====
County	Bud Shuster Republican		Write-in		Margin		Total votes cast
County	#	%	#	%	#	%	Total votes cast
Bedford	11,315	100.00%	0	0.00%	11,315	100.00%	11,315
Blair	26,230	99.19%	213	0.81%	26,017	98.38%	26,443
Centre	4,058	100.00%	0	0.00%	4,058	100.00%	4,058
Clearfield	19,006	99.32%	131	0.68%	18,875	98.64%	19,137
Franklin	28,738	97.58%	712	2.42%	28,026	95.16%	29,450
Fulton	3,082	100.00%	0	0.00%	3,082	100.00%	3,082
Huntingdon	8,805	100.00%	0	0.00%	8,805	100.00%	8,805
Juniata	5,405	100.00%	0	0.00%	5,405	100.00%	5,405
Mifflin	8,842	100.00%	0	0.00%	8,842	100.00%	8,842
Perry	2,720	100.00%	0	0.00%	2,720	100.00%	2,720
Snyder	7,208	100.00%	0	0.00%	7,208	100.00%	7,208
Totals	125,409	99.16%	1,056	0.84%	124,353	98.33%	126,465

== District 10 ==
1998 Pennsylvania's 10th congressional district election
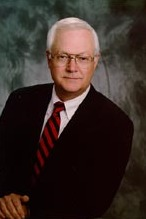

Nominee	Don Sherwood	Patrick Casey
Party	Republican	Democratic
Popular vote	84,275	83,760
Percentage	48.70%	48.40%
U.S. Representative before election
Joseph M. McDade
Republican
Elected U.S. Representative
Don Sherwood
Republican

Incumbent U.S. Representative Joseph M. McDade retired and did not seek reelection.

=== Democratic primary ===
==== Candidates ====
===== Nominee =====
- Patrick Casey, son of former Governor Bob Casey Sr.

==== Primary results ====
Democratic primary results
Party	Candidate	Votes	%
Democratic	Patrick Casey	26,882	100.00
Total votes		26,882	100.00

=== Republican primary ===
==== Candidates ====
===== Nominee =====
- Don Sherwood, businessman and board president of the Tunkhannock Area School District

===== Eliminated in primary =====
- Joe Albert
- James P. Connors
- Frank Demko
- Jerry Donahue
- Errol Flynn, candidate for Congress in 1996
- Norbert R. Kosciuk
- Mary Rogan

==== Primary results ====
Republican primary results
Party	Candidate	Votes	%
Republican	Don Sherwood	21,252	43.71
Republican	James P. Connors	11,554	23.76
Republican	Errol Flynn	7,714	15.87
Republican	Jerry Donahue	4,797	9.87
Republican	Mary Rogan	1,212	2.49
Republican	Frank Demko	1,080	2.22
Republican	Norbert R. Kosciuk	616	1.27
Republican	Joe Albert	393	0.81
Total votes		48,618	100.00

=== General election ===
==== Polling ====
Poll source	Date(s)	Sample size	Margin of error	Don Sherwood (R)	Pat Casey (D)	Other / undecided (Note: Calculated by taking the difference of 100% and all other candidates combined.)
SurveyUSA	November 1, 1998	400	—	47%	48%	5%

==== Results ====
Pennsylvania's 10th congressional district, 1998
Party	Candidate	Votes	%
Republican	Don Sherwood	84,275	48.70
Democratic	Patrick Casey	83,760	48.40
Reform	Thomas J. McLaughlin	4,998	2.89
Write-in		23	0.01
Total votes		173,056	100.00
Republican hold			

==== By county ====
County	Don Sherwood Republican		Patrick Casey Democratic		Thomas McLaughlin Reform		Write-in		Margin		Total votes cast
County	#	%	#	%	#	%	#	%	#	%	Total votes cast
Bradford	10,935	64.64%	5,398	31.91%	570	3.37%	13	0.08%	5,537	32.73%	16,916
Lackawanna	25,775	35.56%	44,897	61.94%	1,812	2.50%	0	0.00%	–19,122	–26.38%	72,484
Lycoming	14,138	56.86%	10,017	40.29%	710	2.86%	0	0.00%	4,121	16.57%	24,865
Monroe	5,599	48.22%	5,594	48.18%	418	3.60%	0	0.00%	5	0.04%	11,611
Pike	5,532	54.78%	4,375	43.32%	192	1.90%	0	0.00%	1,157	11.46%	10,099
Sullivan	1,336	56.73%	928	39.41%	91	3.86%	0	0.00%	408	17.32%	2,355
Susquehanna	7,348	56.09%	5,263	40.18%	489	3.73%	0	0.00%	2,085	15.91%	13,100
Wayne	7,339	57.66%	5,055	39.72%	333	2.62%	1	0.01%	2,284	17.94%	12,728
Wyoming	6,264	66.60%	2,733	29.06%	407	4.33%	1	0.01%	3,531	37.54%	9,405
Totals	84,266	48.55%	84,260	48.55%	5,022	2.89%	15	0.01%	6	0.00%	173,563

== District 11 ==
1998 Pennsylvania's 11th congressional district election
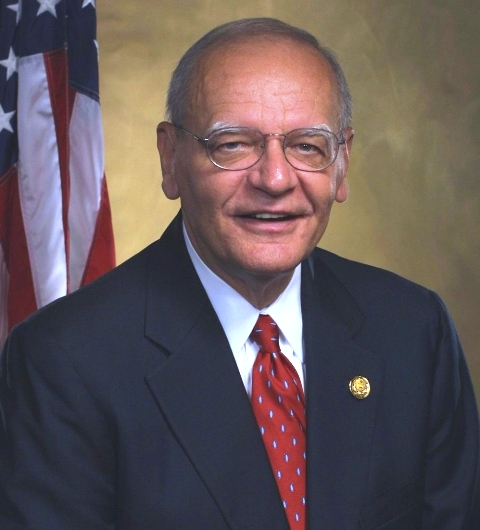

Nominee	Paul Kanjorski	Stephen Urban
Party	Democratic	Republican
Popular vote	88,933	44,123
Percentage	66.83%	33.16%
U.S. Representative before election
Paul Kanjorski
Democratic
Elected U.S. Representative
Paul Kanjorski
Democratic

=== Democratic primary ===
==== Candidates ====
===== Nominee =====
- Paul Kanjorski, incumbent U.S. Representative

==== Primary results ====
Democratic primary results
Party	Candidate	Votes	%
Democratic	Paul Kanjorski (incumbent)	27,452	100.00
Total votes		27,452	100.00

=== Republican primary ===
==== Candidates ====
===== Nominee =====
- Stephen Urban, former military officer and Republican nominee in 1996

==== Primary results ====
Republican primary results
Party	Candidate	Votes	%
Republican	Stephen Urban	16,069	100.00
Total votes		16,069	100.00

=== General election ===
Pennsylvania's 11th congressional district, 1998
Party	Candidate	Votes	%
Democratic	Paul Kanjorski (incumbent)	88,933	66.83
Republican	Stephen Urban	44,123	33.16
Write-in		9	0.01
Total votes		133,065	100.00
Democratic hold			

==== By county ====
County	Paul Kanjorski Democratic		Stephen Urban Republican		Write-in		Margin		Total votes cast
County	#	%	#	%	#	%	#	%	Total votes cast
Carbon	8,892	67.53%	4,276	32.47%	0	0.00%	4,616	35.06%	13,168
Columbia	9,035	62.88%	5,329	37.09%	5	0.03%	3,706	25.79%	14,369
Luzerne	52,702	69.62%	22,996	30.38%	0	0.00%	29,706	39.24%	75,698
Monroe	7,359	53.87%	6,301	46.13%	0	0.00%	1,058	7.74%	13,660
Montour	2,518	59.87%	1,686	40.09%	2	0.05%	832	19.78%	4,206
Northumberland	8,426	70.68%	3,495	29.32%	0	0.00%	4,931	41.36%	11,921
Totals	88,932	66.86%	44,083	33.14%	7	0.01%	44,849	33.72%	133,022

== District 12 ==
1998 Pennsylvania's 12th congressional district election
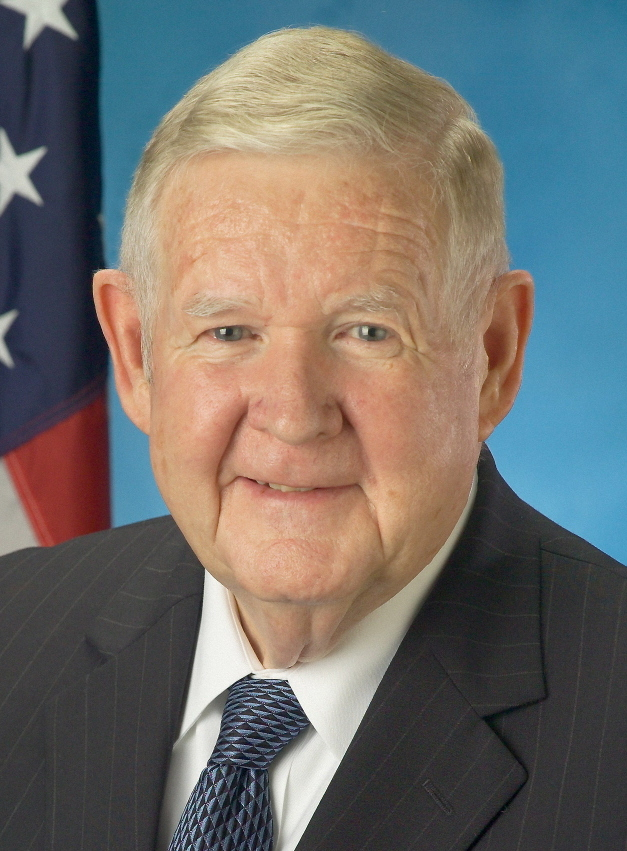

Nominee	John Murtha	Timothy Holloway
Party	Democratic	Republican
Popular vote	100,528	46,239
Percentage	68.49%	31.50%
U.S. Representative before election
John Murtha
Democratic
Elected U.S. Representative
John Murtha
Democratic

=== Democratic primary ===
==== Candidates ====
===== Nominee =====
- John Murtha, incumbent U.S. Representative

==== Primary results ====
Democratic primary results
Party	Candidate	Votes	%
Democratic	John Murtha (incumbent)	31,039	100.00
Total votes		31,039	100.00

=== Republican primary ===
==== Candidates ====
===== Nominee =====
- Timothy E. Holloway

==== Primary results ====
Republican primary results
Party	Candidate	Votes	%
Republican	Timothy E. Holloway	18,829	100.00
Total votes		18,829	100.00

=== General election ===
Pennsylvania's 12th congressional district, 1998
Party	Candidate	Votes	%
Democratic	John Murtha (incumbent)	100,528	68.49
Republican	Timothy E. Holloway	46,239	31.50
Write-in		13	0.01
Total votes		146,780	100.00
Democratic hold			

==== By county ====
County	John Murtha Democratic		Timothy Holloway Republican		Margin		Total votes cast
County	#	%	#	%	#	%	Total votes cast
Armstrong	11,324	63.68%	6,459	36.32%	4,865	27.36%	17,783
Cambria	34,463	76.78%	10,424	23.22%	24,039	53.56%	44,887
Clarion	194	64.88%	105	35.12%	89	29.76%	299
Fayette	7,069	70.42%	2,970	29.58%	4,099	40.84%	10,039
Indiana	15,277	65.91%	7,903	34.09%	7,374	31.82%	23,180
Somerset	15,695	64.15%	8,770	35.85%	6,925	28.30%	24,465
Westmoreland	16,614	63.33%	9,619	36.67%	6,995	26.66%	26,233
Totals	100,636	68.51%	46,250	31.49%	54,386	37.03%	146,886

== District 13 ==
1998 Pennsylvania's 13th congressional district election
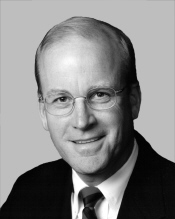

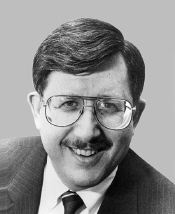
Nominee	Joe Hoeffel	Jon D. Fox
Party	Democratic	Republican
Popular vote	95,105	85,915
Percentage	51.55%	46.57%
U.S. Representative before election
Jon D. Fox
Republican
Elected U.S. Representative
Joe Hoeffel
Democratic

After defeating Joe Hoeffel by an 84-vote margin in 1996, incumbent U.S. Representative Jon D. Fox lost in a rematch, flipping the seat to the Democrats.

=== Democratic primary ===
==== Candidates ====
===== Nominee =====
- Joe Hoeffel, member of the Montgomery County Board of Commissioners and Democratic nominee in 1996

==== Primary results ====
Democratic primary results
Party	Candidate	Votes	%
Democratic	Joe Hoeffel	12,516	100.00
Total votes		12,516	100.00

=== Republican primary ===
==== Candidates ====
===== Nominee =====
- Jon D. Fox, incumbent U.S. Representative

===== Eliminated in primary =====
- Melissa Brown, ophthalmologist
- Michael J. McMonagle
- Jonathan Newman

==== Primary results ====
Republican primary results
Party	Candidate	Votes	%
Republican	Jon D. Fox (incumbent)	24,383	49.31
Republican	Michael J. McMonagle	10,621	21.48
Republican	Melissa Brown	8,860	17.92
Republican	Jonathan Newman	5,582	11.29
Total votes		49,446	100.00

=== General election ===
==== Polling ====
Poll source	Date(s)	Sample size	Margin of error	Jon D. Fox (R)	Joe Hoeffel (D)	Other / undecided (Note: Calculated by taking the difference of 100% and all other candidates combined.)
Zogby Interactive/JZ Analytics	October 25, 1998	300	—	48%	42%	10%

==== Results ====
Pennsylvania's 13th congressional district, 1998
Party	Candidate	Votes	%
Democratic	Joe Hoeffel	95,105	51.55
Republican	Jon D. Fox (incumbent)	85,915	46.57
Libertarian	Thomas Patrick Burke	3,470	1.88
Total votes		184,490	100.00
Democratic gain from Republican			

==== By county ====
County	Joe Hoeffel Democratic		Jon D. Fox Republican		Thomas Burke Libertarian		Margin		Total votes cast
County	#	%	#	%	#	%	#	%	Total votes cast
Montgomery	95,105	51.55%	85,915	46.57%	3,470	1.88%	9,190	4.98%	184,490
Totals	95,105	51.55%	85,915	46.57%	3,470	1.88%	9,190	4.98%	184,490

== District 14 ==
1998 Pennsylvania's 14th congressional district election
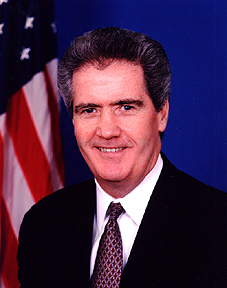

Nominee	William J. Coyne	Bill Ravotti
Party	Democratic	Republican
Popular vote	83,355	52,745
Percentage	60.52%	38.29%
U.S. Representative before election
William J. Coyne
Democratic
Elected U.S. Representative
William J. Coyne
Democratic

=== Democratic primary ===
==== Candidates ====
===== Nominee =====
- William J. Coyne, incumbent U.S. Representative

==== Primary results ====
Democratic primary results
Party	Candidate	Votes	%
Democratic	William J. Coyne (incumbent)	56,537	100.00
Total votes		56,537	100.00

=== Republican primary ===
==== Candidates ====
===== Nominee =====
- Bill Ravotti, Republican nominee in 1996

==== Primary results ====
Republican primary results
Party	Candidate	Votes	%
Republican	Bill Ravotti	17,860	100.00
Total votes		17,860	100.00

=== General election ===
Pennsylvania's 14th congressional district, 1998
Party	Candidate	Votes	%
Democratic	William J. Coyne (incumbent)	83,355	60.52
Republican	Bill Ravotti	52,745	38.29
Socialist Workers	Dorothy L. Kolis	1,625	1.18
Write-in		11	0.01
Total votes		137,736	100.00
Democratic hold			

==== By county ====
County	William J. Coyne Democratic		Bill Ravotti Republican		Dorothy Kolis Socialist Workers		Margin		Total votes cast
County	#	%	#	%	#	%	#	%	Total votes cast
Allegheny	83,355	60.52%	52,745	38.30%	1,625	1.18%	30,610	22.22%	137,725
Totals	83,355	60.52%	52,745	38.30%	1,625	1.18%	30,610	22.22%	137,725

== District 15 ==
1998 Pennsylvania's 15th congressional district election
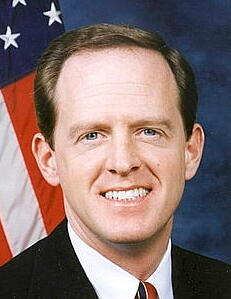

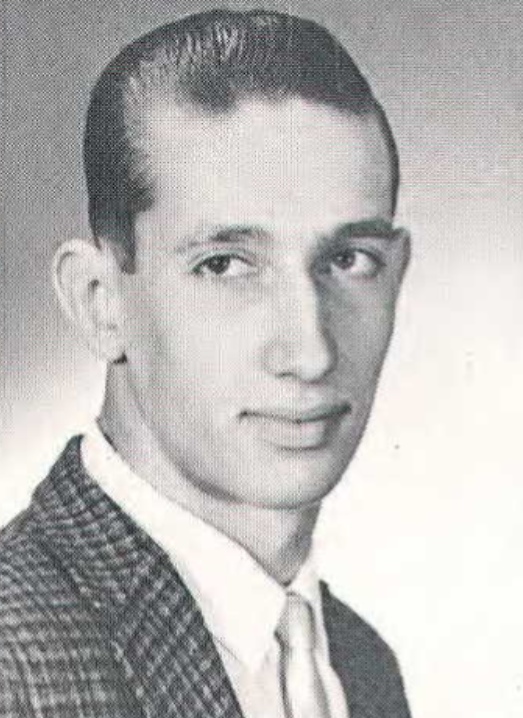
Nominee	Pat Toomey	Roy Afflerbach
Party	Republican	Democratic
Popular vote	81,755	66,930
Percentage	54.98%	45.01%
U.S. Representative before election
Paul McHale
Democratic
Elected U.S. Representative
Pat Toomey
Republican

Incumbent U.S. Representative Paul McHale, a Democrat, retired and was succeeded by Pat Toomey, flipping the seat to the Republicans.

=== Democratic primary ===
==== Candidates ====
===== Nominee =====
- Roy Afflerbach, member of the Pennsylvania State Senate (1987–present)

===== Eliminated in primary =====
- Janice McElroy

==== Primary results ====
Democratic primary results
Party	Candidate	Votes	%
Democratic	Roy Afflerbach	14,466	62.74
Democratic	Janice McElroy	8,590	37.26
Total votes		23,056	100.00

=== Republican primary ===
==== Candidates ====
===== Nominee =====
- Pat Toomey, businessman and member of the Allentown Government Study Commission

===== Eliminated in primary =====
- Lawrence M. Grello
- Bob Kilbanks
- Joe Pascuzzo
- Nick Sabatine
- Joseph Uliana, member of the Pennsylvania State Senate (1995–present)

==== Primary results ====
Republican primary results
Party	Candidate	Votes	%
Republican	Pat Toomey	7,981	27.13
Republican	Bob Kilbanks	7,266	24.70
Republican	Joseph Uliana	6,912	23.49
Republican	Joe Pascuzzo	3,518	11.96
Republican	Nick Sabatine	3,219	10.94
Republican	Lawrence M. Grello	525	1.78
Total votes		29,421	100.00

=== General election ===
Pennsylvania's 15th congressional district, 1998
Party	Candidate	Votes	%
Republican	Pat Toomey	81,755	54.98
Democratic	Roy Afflerbach	66,930	45.01
Write-in		21	0.01
Total votes		148,706	100.00
Republican gain from Democratic			

==== By county ====
County	Pat Toomey Republican		Roy Afflerbach Democratic		Write-in		Margin		Total votes cast
County	#	%	#	%	#	%	#	%	Total votes cast
Lehigh	42,371	54.97%	34,697	45.01%	13	0.02%	7,674	9.96%	77,081
Montgomery	4,205	64.40%	2,324	35.60%	0	0.00%	1,881	28.80%	6,529
Northampton	35,176	54.05%	29,909	45.95%	0	0.00%	5,267	8.10%	65,085
Totals	81,752	54.98%	66,930	45.01%	13	0.01%	14,822	9.97%	148,695

== District 16 ==
1998 Pennsylvania's 16th congressional district election
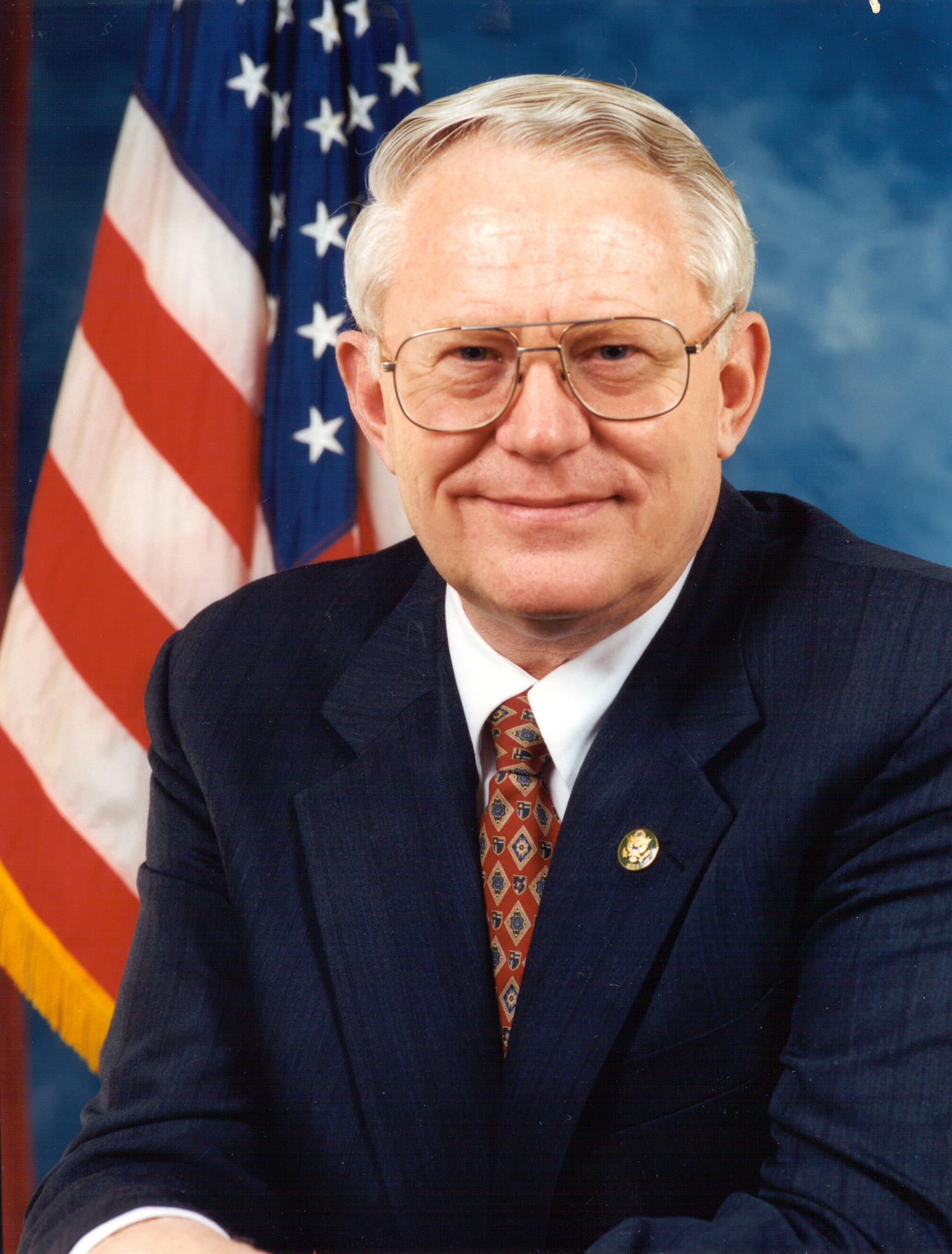

Nominee	Joe Pitts	Robert Yorczyk
Party	Republican	Democratic
Popular vote	95,979	40,092
Percentage	70.53%	29.46%
U.S. Representative before election
Joe Pitts
Republican
Elected U.S. Representative
Joe Pitts
Republican

=== Republican primary ===
==== Candidates ====
===== Nominee =====
- Joe Pitts, incumbent U.S. Representative

==== Primary results ====
Republican primary results
Party	Candidate	Votes	%
Republican	Joe Pitts (incumbent)	22,529	100.00
Total votes		22,529	100.00

=== General election ===
Pennsylvania's 16th congressional district, 1998
Party	Candidate	Votes	%
Republican	Joe Pitts (incumbent)	95,979	70.53
Democratic	Robert Yorczyk	40,092	29.46
Write-in		14	0.01
Total votes		136,085	100.00
Republican hold			

==== By county ====
County	Joe Pitts Republican		Robert Yorczyk Democratic		Write-in		Margin		Total votes cast
County	#	%	#	%	#	%	#	%	Total votes cast
Chester	47,742	66.06%	23,947	33.14%	578	0.80%	23,795	32.92%	72,267
Lancaster	48,237	74.91%	16,145	25.07%	14	0.02%	32,092	49.84%	64,396
Totals	95,979	70.23%	40,092	29.34%	592	0.43%	55,887	40.89%	136,663

== District 17 ==
1998 Pennsylvania's 17th congressional district election
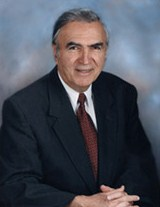
Nominee	George Gekas
Party	Republican
Popular vote	114,931
Percentage	99.85%
U.S. Representative before election
George Gekas
Republican
Elected U.S. Representative
George Gekas
Republican

=== Republican primary ===
==== Candidates ====
===== Nominee =====
- George Gekas, incumbent U.S. Representative

==== Primary results ====
Republican primary results
Party	Candidate	Votes	%
Republican	George Gekas (incumbent)	37,787	100.00
Total votes		37,787	100.00

=== General election ===
Pennsylvania's 17th congressional district, 1998
Party	Candidate	Votes	%
Republican	George Gekas (incumbent)	114,931	99.85
Write-in		176	0.15
Total votes		115,107	100.00
Republican hold			

==== By county ====
County	George Gekas Republican		Write-in		Margin		Total votes cast
County	#	%	#	%	#	%	Total votes cast
Cumberland	12,225	98.90%	136	1.10%	12,089	97.80%	12,361
Dauphin	49,326	100.00%	0	0.00%	49,326	100.00%	49,326
Lancaster	26,259	99.92%	21	0.08%	26,238	99.84%	26,280
Lebanon	21,060	99.91%	18	0.09%	21,042	99.82%	21,078
Perry	6,054	100.00%	0	0.00%	6,054	100.00%	6,054
Totals	114,924	99.85%	175	0.15%	114,749	99.70%	115,099

== District 18 ==
1998 Pennsylvania's 18th congressional district election
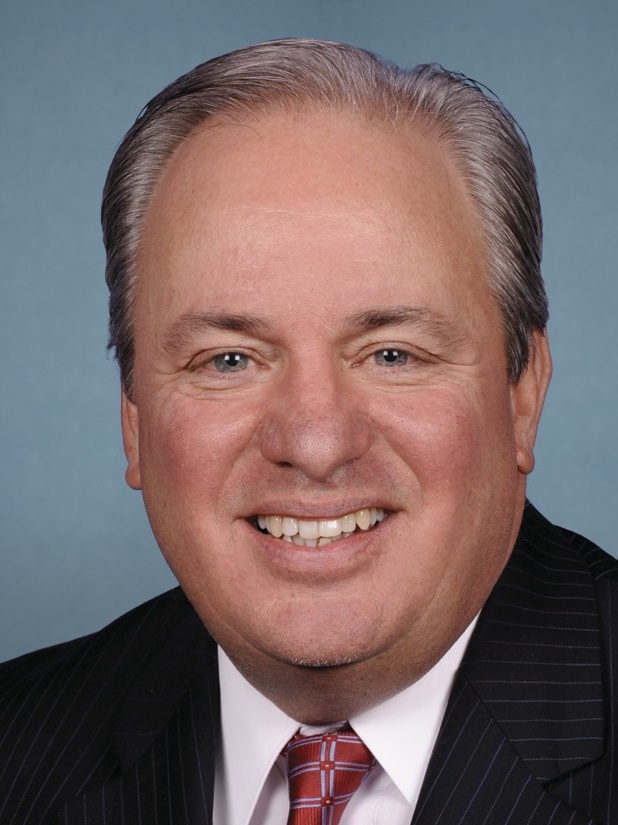

Nominee	Mike Doyle	Dick Walker
Party	Democratic	Republican
Popular vote	98,363	46,945
Percentage	67.68%	32.30%
U.S. Representative before election
Mike Doyle
Democratic
Elected U.S. Representative
Mike Doyle
Democratic

=== Democratic primary ===
==== Candidates ====
===== Nominee =====
- Mike Doyle, incumbent U.S. Representative

===== Eliminated in primary =====
- Mary Beth Hacke

==== Primary results ====
Democratic primary results
Party	Candidate	Votes	%
Democratic	Mike Doyle (incumbent)	42,288	65.10
Democratic	Mary Beth Hacke	22,672	34.90
Total votes		64,960	100.00

=== Republican primary ===
==== Candidates ====
===== Nominee =====
- Dick Walker

===== Eliminated in primary =====
- Craig Stephens

==== Primary results ====
Republican primary results
Party	Candidate	Votes	%
Republican	Dick Walker	14,426	52.79
Republican	Craig Stephens	12,901	47.21
Total votes		27,327	100.00

=== General election ===
Pennsylvania's 18th congressional district, 1998
Party	Candidate	Votes	%
Democratic	Mike Doyle (incumbent)	98,363	67.68
Republican	Dick Walker	46,945	32.30
Write-in		29	0.02
Total votes		145,337	100.00
Democratic hold			

==== By county ====
County	Mike Doyle Democratic		Dick Walker Republican		Write-in		Margin		Total votes cast
County	#	%	#	%	#	%	#	%	Total votes cast
Allegheny	98,363	67.68%	46,945	32.30%	29	0.02%	51,418	35.38%	145,337
Totals	98,363	67.68%	46,945	32.30%	29	0.02%	51,418	35.38%	145,337

== District 19 ==
1998 Pennsylvania's 19th congressional district election
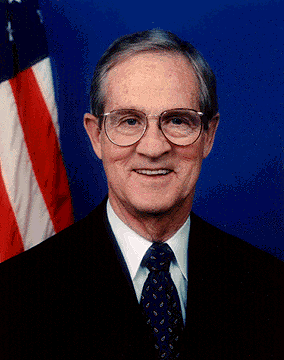

Nominee	Bill Goodling	Linda Ropp
Party	Republican	Democratic
Popular vote	96,284	40,674
Percentage	67.57%	28.55%
U.S. Representative before election
Bill Goodling
Republican
Elected U.S. Representative
Bill Goodling
Republican

=== Democratic primary ===
==== Candidates ====
===== Nominee =====
- Linda G. Ropp

==== Primary results ====
Democratic primary results
Party	Candidate	Votes	%
Democratic	Linda G. Ropp	14,556	100.00
Total votes		14,556	100.00

=== Republican primary ===
==== Candidates ====
===== Nominee =====
- Bill Goodling, incumbent U.S. Representative

===== Eliminated in primary =====
- Charlie Gerow, Republican Party strategist

==== Primary results ====
Republican primary results
Party	Candidate	Votes	%
Republican	Bill Goodling (incumbent)	36,054	67.64
Republican	Charlie Gerow	17,247	32.36
Total votes		53,301	100.00

=== General election ===
Pennsylvania's 19th congressional district, 1998
Party	Candidate	Votes	%
Republican	Bill Goodling (incumbent)	96,284	67.57
Democratic	Linda G. Ropp	40,674	28.55
Libertarian	Gary M. Shoemaker	5,444	3.82
Write-in		87	0.06
Total votes		142,489	100.00
Republican hold			

==== By county ====
County	Bill Goodling Republican		Linda Ropp Democratic		Gary Shoemaker Libertarian		Write-in		Margin		Total votes cast
County	#	%	#	%	#	%	#	%	#	%	Total votes cast
Adams	12,947	64.61%	5,978	29.83%	1,109	5.53%	5	0.02%	6,969	34.78%	20,039
Cumberland	26,231	68.22%	10,488	27.28%	1,666	4.33%	66	0.17%	15,743	40.94%	38,451
York	57,106	67.98%	24,208	28.82%	2,669	3.18%	15	0.02%	32,898	39.16%	83,998
Totals	96,284	67.57%	40,674	28.55%	5,444	3.82%	86	0.06%	55,610	39.03%	142,488

== District 20 ==
1998 Pennsylvania's 20th congressional district
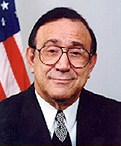
Nominee	Frank Mascara
Party	Democratic
Popular vote	97,885
Percentage	99.81%
U.S. Representative before election
Frank Mascara
Democratic
Elected U.S. Representative
Frank Mascara
Democratic

=== Democratic primary ===
==== Candidates ====
===== Nominee =====
- Frank Mascara, incumbent U.S. Representative

==== Primary results ====
Democratic primary results
Party	Candidate	Votes	%
Democratic	Frank Mascara (incumbent)	40,882	100.00
Total votes		40,882	100.00

=== General election ===
Pennsylvania's 20th congressional district, 1998
Party	Candidate	Votes	%
Democratic	Frank Mascara (incumbent)	97,885	99.81
Write-in		190	0.19
Total votes		98,075	100.00
Democratic hold			

==== By county ====
County	Frank Mascara Democratic		Write-in		Margin		Total votes cast
County	#	%	#	%	#	%	Total votes cast
Allegheny	18,695	100.00%	0	0.00%	18,695	100.00%	18,695
Fayette	13,576	100.00%	0	0.00%	13,576	100.00%	13,576
Greene	6,932	99.14%	60	0.86%	6,872	98.28%	6,992
Washington	40,704	100.00%	0	0.00%	40,704	100.00%	40,704
Westmoreland	17,977	100.00%	0	0.00%	17,977	100.00%	17,977
Totals	97,884	99.94%	60	0.06%	97,824	99.88%	97,944

== District 21 ==
1998 Pennsylvania's 21st congressional district election
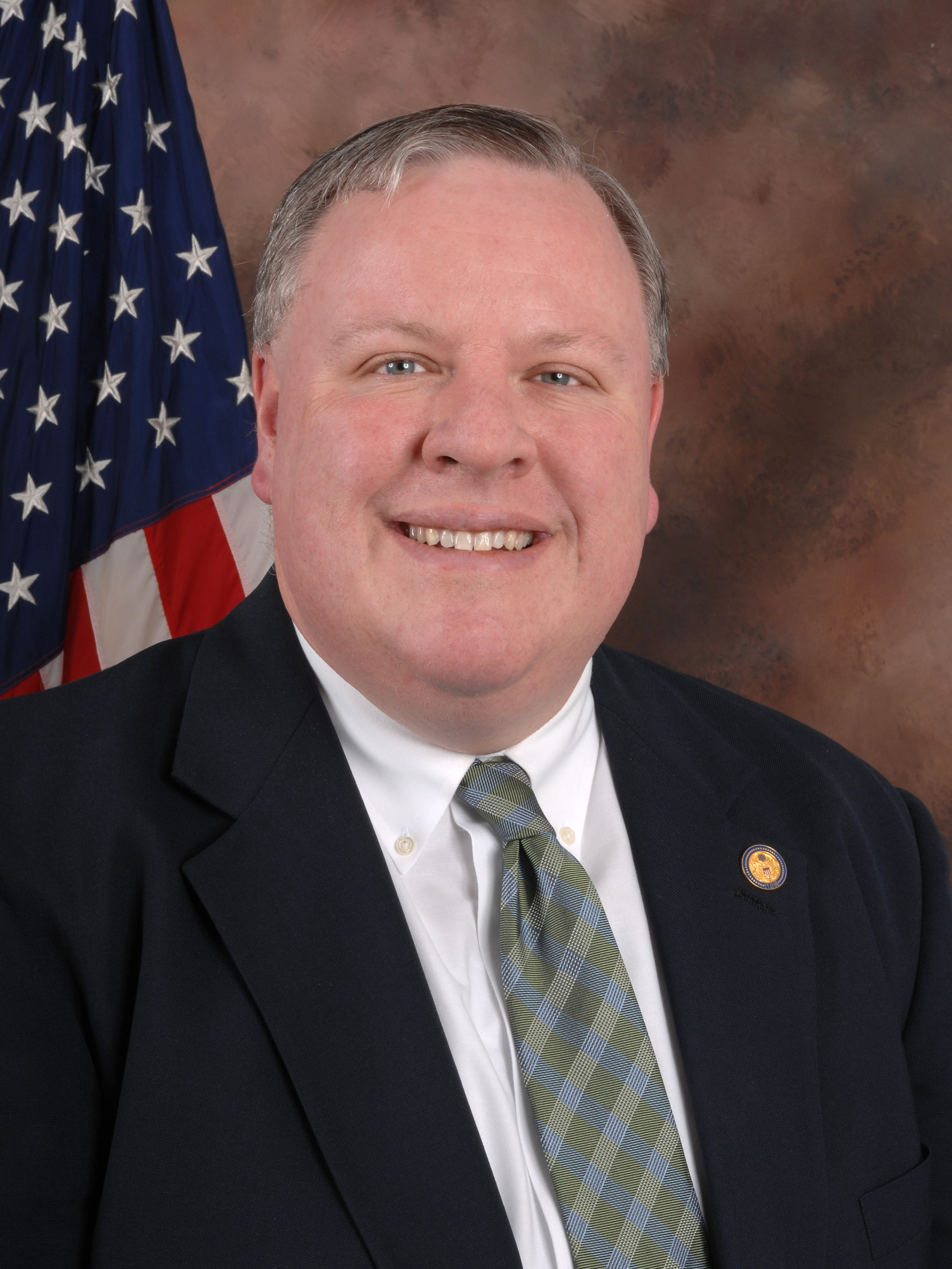

Nominee	Phil English	Larry Klemens
Party	Republican	Democratic
Popular vote	94,518	54,591
Percentage	63.39%	36.61%
U.S. Representative before election
Phil English
Republican
Elected U.S. Representative
Phil English
Republican

=== Democratic primary ===
==== Candidates ====
===== Nominee =====
- Larry Klemens

==== Primary results ====
Democratic primary results
Party	Candidate	Votes	%
Democratic	Larry Klemens	15,888	100.00
Total votes		15,888	100.00

=== Republican primary ===
==== Candidates ====
===== Nominee =====
- Phil English, incumbent U.S. Representative

==== Primary results ====
Republican primary results
Party	Candidate	Votes	%
Republican	Phil English (incumbent)	21,512	100.00
Total votes		21,512	100.00

=== General election ===
Pennsylvania's 21st congressional district, 1998
Party	Candidate	Votes	%
Republican	Phil English (incumbent)	94,518	63.39
Democratic	Larry Klemens	54,591	36.61
Write-in		6	0.00
Total votes		149,115	100.00
Republican hold			

==== By county ====
County	Phil English Republican		Larry Klemens Democratic		Write-in		Margin		Total votes cast
County	#	%	#	%	#	%	#	%	Total votes cast
Butler	18,984	65.25%	10,109	34.75%	1	0.00%	8,875	30.50%	29,094
Crawford	11,035	68.34%	5,112	31.66%	0	0.00%	5,923	36.68%	16,147
Erie	46,585	62.64%	27,785	37.36%	0	0.00%	18,800	25.28%	74,370
Mercer	17,908	60.51%	11,683	39.47%	5	0.02%	6,225	21.04%	29,596
Totals	94,512	63.34%	54,689	36.65%	6	0.00%	39,823	26.69%	149,207

== See also ==
- Pennsylvania's congressional delegations
- 106th United States Congress
