= Joel J. Johnson =

American politician

Member of the Pennsylvania House of Representatives from the 197th district
- In office 1969–1980
- Preceded by: District created
- Succeeded by: Junius M. Emerson

Personal details
- Born: March 30, 1923 Hamilton, North Carolina
- Died: April 6, 2009 (aged 86) Philadelphia, Pennsylvania
- Party: Democratic
- Children: Steven Johnson, Mark Johnson, Harvey Johnson, Alma Hicks, Deidre Johnson

Joel J. Johnson (March 30, 1923 – April 6, 2009) was a former Democratic member of the Pennsylvania House of Representatives.
