= Kensington Welfare Rights Union =

American social justice group

The Kensington Welfare Rights Union (KWRU) is a progressive social justice, political action, and advocacy group of, by, and for the poor and homeless operating out of Philadelphia, Pennsylvania. The group was founded by six women, Alexis Baptist, Sandy Brennan, Diane Coyett, Cheri Honkala, Louis Mayberry, and Debra Witzman, and formed in Philadelphia's Kensington neighborhood in April 1991.

KWRU is a part of the national organization the Poor People's Economic Human Rights Campaign, a coalition of grassroots organizations, community groups, and non-profit organizations committed to uniting the poor across color lines as the leadership base for a broad movement to abolish poverty. KWRU is also a member of the steering committee of the A.N.S.W.E.R. coalition.

KWRU was written about in the 1997 book Myth of the Welfare Queen by Pulitzer Prize-winning journalist David Zucchino.

== Group activities ==
KWRU often used direct action tactics such as tent cities and housing takeover to provide housing and dramatize the plight of the homeless. In 1994 KWRU organized the takeover of 12 vacant HUD owned homes in Philadelphia to try to call attention to HUD's failed housing policies.
