= Danilo Burgos =

American politician (born 1978)

Member of the Pennsylvania House of Representatives from the 197th district
- Incumbent
- Assumed office January 2, 2019
- Preceded by: Emilio Vazquez

Personal details
- Born: January 19, 1978 (age 47); New York City, New York, U.S.
- Political party: Democratic

Danilo Burgos (born 19 January 1978) is an American politician serving as a member of the Pennsylvania House of Representatives from the 197th district. Elected in November 2018, he assumed office on January 2, 2019.

== Early life and education ==
Burgos was born in New York City, the son of immigrants from the Dominican Republic. His family moved to Philadelphia when he was 10. Growing up, his family operated a grocery store. Burgos graduated from Olney High School.

== Career ==
Burgos opened a grocery store in 1998 and co-founded the Philadelphia Dominican Grocers Association. He also worked for city councilors Allan Domb and Maria Quiñones-Sánchez. When Burgos assumed office in 2019, he became the first Dominican-American to be elected to the Pennsylvania General Assembly. During the 2019–2020 legislative session, Burgos served as secretary of the House Agriculture & Rural Affairs Committee. During the 2020 presidential election, Burgos was a member of the Joe Biden's Latino Leadership Council.
