= Gary Williams (politician) =

American politician

Member of the Pennsylvania House of Representatives from the 197th district
- In office May 2012 – January 2013
- Preceded by: Jewell Williams
- Succeeded by: J.P. Miranda

Personal details
- Party: Democratic

Gary Williams is a Democratic politician and former member of the Pennsylvania House of Representatives. He briefly served the 197th district, running in a special election to fill the last eight months of Jewell Williams' term. Williams has served as an aide to a variety of politicians, including Philadelphia City Councilors John F. Street and Darrell Clarke and state representatives Frank L. Oliver and Michelle Brownlee. He now works as a clerk in the Philadelphia Marriage Records Office.
