= Junius Emerson =

American politician

Junius M. Emerson

Member of the Pennsylvania House of Representatives from the 197th district
- In office 1965 - 1968 – 1981 - 1982
- Preceded by: Joel J. Johnson
- Succeeded by: Andrew Carn

Personal details
- Born: June 23, 1926 Anderson, South Carolina, U.S.
- Died: April 23, 1992 (aged 65) Philadelphia, Pennsylvania, U.S.
- Party: Democratic
- Spouse: Martha Jane (Lee) Emerson
- Children: 3

Junius M. Emerson (June 23, 1926 – April 23, 1992) was a Democratic member of the Pennsylvania House of Representatives. He served in the 82nd Airborne.
