= Poor People's Economic Human Rights Campaign =

US human rights activism group

The Poor People's Economic Human Rights Campaign (PPEHRC), also called the "Poor People’s Army", is a human rights activism group in the United States founded by Cheri Honkala.

== History ==
In June 1998, the Kensington Welfare Rights Union (KWRU) organized the national New Freedom Bus Tour to bring awareness to the issues of poverty and economic human rights. During the tour, KWRU made contact with many groups and organizations from across the country that were interested in working to gain and ensure economic human rights for all people. In October, 1998 the Poor People's Summit on Human Rights was held in Philadelphia, PA with many organizations dedicated to economic human rights in attendance. It was out of this meeting and the New Freedom Bus Tour that the PPEHRC was formed.

== Member organizations ==
Most organization members of the PPEHRC are community-based and headed by people living in poverty themselves. The organizations are varied, and do all focus exclusively – or even primary – on the economic aspect of human rights. However, all member organizations agree to endorse and participate in the collective work of the campaign.

== University of the Poor ==
The University of the Poor is a community-based web-centric institution, dedicated in training and educating leaders in the larger movement to end poverty. It was created in 1999 as the national education division of the PPEHRC, and was intended to focus on the unity and development of the leaders of the campaign. The University of the Poor is not a degree-granting organization.

The University of the Poor was brought as a result of the gathering of economic human rights groups that occurred March to the Americas.

The University of the Poor carries out Economic Human Rights Organizing Schools, with organizations across the United States. These schools are based on helping each organization on educating based upon their ideological goals.

As of May 1, 2008, the founders and staff of the University of the Poor resigned from the Poor People's Economic Human Rights Campaign (PPEHRC). The University of the Poor was reconstituted as an independent organization, and no longer affiliated with the Poor People's Economic Human Rights Campaign (PPEHRC).

== Events ==
The Poor People's Economic Human Rights Campaign and its member organizations, have held events to raise awareness and draw attention to the systematic denial of economic human rights in the United States. These events also seek to highlight those who benefit from this denial of economic human rights. Included these events are:

- 1998 – New Freedom Bus Tour
- 1999 – March of the Americas: representatives from Central and South America and Canada joined PPEHRC organizations, on march from Washington, D.C., to the United Nations in New York City; the march started in October and lasted for a month, and concluded with a conference.
- 2000 – March for Economic Human Rights
- 2000 – March on the opening day of the Republican National Convention in Philadelphia, Pennsylvania, that was attended by thousands of people
- 2001 – March for Compassion and Spiritual Renewal
- 2001 – Poor People's Summit to End Poverty
- 2002 – National Freedom Bus Tour: crossed the country between November 10 and December 10.
- 2002 – March for Our Lives
- 2003 – Poor People's March for Economic Human Rights through the South: held in August to commemorate the thirty-fifth anniversary of the 1968 Poor People's March which Dr. Martin Luther King, he was organizing when he was assassinated.
- 2004 – March on the opening day of the Republican National Convention in New York City
- 2005 – Week-long University of the Poor Leadership School: classes, workshops, and other activities held at Bryn Mawr College in July, which brought together more than a hundred leaders of PPEHRC members of the organizations across the United States.
- 2006 – National Truth Commission: held in Cleveland, Ohio, in July; brought people together from across the United States and around the world to bring attention to the indisputable suffering of people living in extreme poverty; a panel of domestic and international commissioners, social leaders heard the evaluated testimonies of violations on the rights to health, education, housing, water, and other basic needs, as well as on the removal of children from failure to return children to their homes as a result of failure by the government to meet the economic human rights of families.
- 2016 – "March for Our Lives" at the 2016 Democratic National Convention.
