= Pennsylvania House of Representatives, District 197 =

American legislative district

Pennsylvania's 197th State House of Representatives district
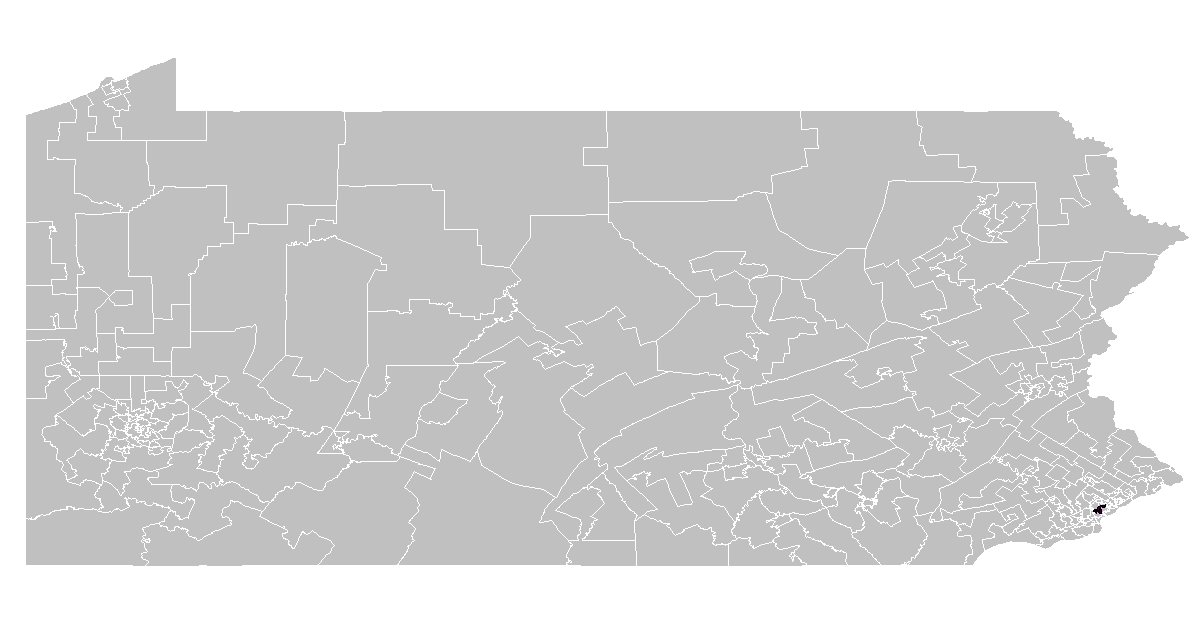
Representative
Danilo Burgos; D–Philadelphia

The 197th Pennsylvania House of Representatives District is located in Philadelphia County and includes the following areas:

- Ward 11 [PART, Divisions 01, 02, 03, 07, 08, 11, 13, 19 and 20]
- Ward 16 [PART, Divisions 01, 02, 03, 04 and 05]
- Ward 19
- Ward 37 [PART, Divisions 15, 16, 18, 19 and 20]
- Ward 42 [PART, Divisions 02, 03, 04, 05, 06, 07, 08, 09, 10, 11 and 22]
- Ward 43
- Ward 49 [PART, Division 01]

== Representatives ==
Representative	Party	Years	District home	Note
Prior to 1969, seats were apportioned by county.
Joel J. Johnson	Democrat	1969 – 1980		
Junius M. Emerson	Democrat	1981 – 1982		
Andrew J. Carn	Democrat	1983 – 2000		
Jewell Williams	Democrat	2001 – 2012		Resigned to become Sheriff of Philadelphia
Gary Williams	Democrat	2012 – 2013		
Jose Miranda	Democrat	2013 – 2014		
Leslie Acosta	Democrat	2015 – January 3, 2017		Resigned (felony corruption conviction)
Emilio Vazquez	Democrat	April 5, 2017 - 2018		
Danilo Burgos	Democrat	2019–present		
