= TV E =

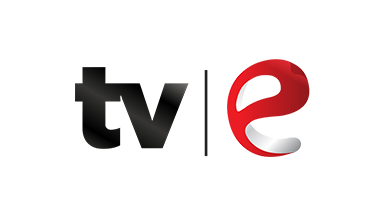
- Country: Montenegro
- Headquarters: Danilovgrad

Programming
- Picture format: 1080i (16:9) (HDTV)

Ownership
- Owner: Lipa Media

History
- Launched: 13 July 2022; 3 years ago

Links
- Website: www.etv.me

TV E is a Montenegrin television station based in Danilovgrad. The television began with experimental broadcasting on July 13, 2022, while on January 12, 2023, it began broadcasting the regular program in full capacity.
