= Jose Miranda (politician) =

American politician (born 1985)

Jose P. Miranda

Member of the Pennsylvania House of Representatives from the 197th district
- In office 2013–2014
- Preceded by: Gary Williams
- Succeeded by: Leslie Acosta

Personal details
- Born: October 30, 1985 (age 40)
- Party: Democratic
- Education: West Chester University

Jose "J.P." Miranda (born October 30, 1985) is an American politician. He served as a Democratic party member of the Pennsylvania House of Representatives, from 2013 to 2014. Miranda previously worked on the staffs of Philadelphia City Council President Darrell Clarke and state Senator Shirley Kitchen.

He was elected to one term in 2012. In January 2014, Miranda and his sister were charged for maintaining a “ghost employee” on his payroll. He was subsequently defeated by Leslie Acosta in the primary election in 2014. In January 2015, Miranda pled guilty to false swearing and ethics violations.
