= Andrew Carn =

American politician

Andrew J. Carn

Member of the Pennsylvania House of Representatives from the 197th district
- In office January 4th, 1983 – November 30, 2000
- Preceded by: Junius M. Emerson
- Succeeded by: Jewell Williams

Personal details
- Born: August 25, 1950 (age 76)
- Party: Democratic
- Spouse: Dorothy
- Education: Howard University

Andrew J. Carn (born August 25, 1950) is a former Democratic member of the Pennsylvania House of Representatives.

He graduated from Thomas Edison High School in 1968 and earned a degree in electrical engineering from Howard University in 1973.

He was sworn in to represent the 197th legislative district in 1983, a position he held until the 2000 election, when he was defeated for the Democratic nomination by Jewell Williams

A Carn-controlled non-profit company, the 197 Plan Development Corp., was sued by the Department of Community and Economic Development for $40,000 in unaccounted for funds.
