= Emilio Vazquez =

American politician

Member of the Pennsylvania House of Representatives from the 197th district
- In office April 5, 2017 – January 2, 2019
- Preceded by: Leslie Acosta
- Succeeded by: Danilo Burgos

Personal details
- Born: Brooklyn, New York
- Party: Democratic

Emilio Vazquez (active 2017–present) is a former Democratic member of the Pennsylvania House of Representatives who represented the 197th House district in Philadelphia, Pennsylvania.

== Political career ==
Vazquez was elected as a write-in candidate in a March 2017 special election to replace Leslie Acosta in Pennsylvania's 197th district. Acosta had resigned in January 2017 following her guilty plea to a fraud charge (the second recent state representative of the 197th district to do so), while the original Democratic candidate to succeed her was kicked off the ballot for not actually residing in the 197th district. While Vazquez was sworn into office, this election is currently under investigation by the Philadelphia Attorney General's Office and Pennsylvania Attorney General. Vazquez is also currently a defendant in a federal lawsuit regarding instances of widespread voter intimidation and election fraud for the election of which he was declared the winner. There is a possibility that the federal court could declare the election null and void and order an entirely new election. Vazquez is a Democratic ward leader and Philadelphia Parking Authority employee.

In the 2018 Democratic primary for his seat, Vazquez placed third, losing to former City Council aide Danilo Burgos. Burgos is the current Representative for Pennsylvania's 197th district.

== Election results ==
Pennsylvania House of Representatives, District 197 special election, 2017
Party	Candidate	Votes	%
Democratic	Emilio Vazquez (write-in)	1,972	73.20
Green	Cheri Honkala (write-in)	286	10.62
Republican	Lucinda Little	201	7.46
Write-in		235	8.72
Total votes		2,694	100.00
Democratic hold			

Pennsylvania House of Representatives, District 197, Democratic Primary Election, 2018
Party	Candidate	Votes	%
Democratic	Danilo Burgos	1,296	37.17
Democratic	Frederick Ramirez	1,199	34.38
Democratic	Emilio Vazquez	992	28.45
Total votes		3,487	100.00
