= Television Trust for the Environment =

Television for the Environment (tve) tve is a UK-registered charity founded by the United Nations Environment Programme, WWF-UK, and Central Independent Television (now part of ITV) in 1984.

The organisation uses the power of storytelling to drive real world change for a more sustainable future.

They receive unrestricted funding support from individuals and organisations. Funding for individual projects comes from a wide range of organisations and commissioners.

tve works with filmmakers and partners worldwide to run media projects, make films and work to promote effective, evidence-based storytelling about environmental issues.

The organisation's series have included Earth Report/Earth Reporters on the global environment; Life/Life on the Edge on globalisation, both broadcast on BBC World News as well as two YouTube series by young film-makers; and a series of short films by African producers around the 2010 Football World Cup. Other productions include regional series for audiences in Africa and Latin America.

The organisation works with 49 partner organizations in 41 countries across Africa, Asia Pacific and Latin America & the Caribbean – including three Partners in China, one in Korea and five in India.

One of the founding Trustees was the award-winning film-maker Adrian Cowell.

Two programmes were included in a BBC Trust report entitled "Funding Arrangements and Sponsorship of Documentary and Feature Programmes on BBC World News". One programme on eradicating the killer global cattle disease Rinderpest was deemed to have a conflict of interest with the sponsor. The second programme was only found to have inadequately clear credits. However they were both found to be editorially impartial, complying with BBC Production Guidelines.

The organisation has one of the largest libraries of copyright cleared environmental films in the world.
