= Leslie Acosta =

American politician (born 1971)

Member of the Pennsylvania House of Representatives from the 197th district
- In office January 6, 2015 – January 3, 2017
- Preceded by: Jose Miranda
- Succeeded by: Emilio Vazquez

Personal details
- Born: July 7, 1971 (age 55) Puerto Rico
- Party: Democratic
- Education: Cairn University

Leslie Acosta (born July 7, 1971) is a former Democratic member of the Pennsylvania House of Representatives representing the 197th House district in Philadelphia, Pennsylvania. She is the daughter of former state representative Ralph Acosta and the first Latina elected to the Pennsylvania Legislature.

Acosta graduated from Jules E. Mastbaum Area Vocational Technical School in Philadelphia. She earned a Bachelor of Arts degree in social work and theology at Cairn University in Langhorne, Pennsylvania.

In September 2016, it was reported Acosta pleaded guilty to a federal misdemeanor charge of conspiring to commit money laundering in connection with an embezzlement scheme. Her crimes were committed between 2002 and 2012, before she took public office, in relation to the prosecution of Renee Tartaglione, sister of state Senator Christine Tartaglione, who is charged with embezzling hundreds of thousands of dollars from a publicly funded clinic for low income patients. Acosta's mother, Sandy Acosta, also pleaded guilty to charges stemming from the stolen funds.

Acosta pleaded guilty to conspiracy to commit money laundering for her role in embezzling money from a not-for-profit organization. She was sentenced to 7 months in prison and ordered to pay restitution of $623,000.

Acosta's guilty plea remained under seal, and by the time the guilty plea became known, it was past the deadline to find a replacement candidate. Facing the prospect of being automatically stripped of her seat upon sentencing (Pennsylvania, like most states, does not allow convicted felons to hold office), Acosta resigned at the beginning of January 2017, shortly after being reelected to a second full term. A special election was held in March to fill her office.
