= Kyle Donahue =

Kyle Donahue may refer to:

- Kyle Donahue (racing driver)
- Kyle Donahue (politician)
