= Matt McGloin =

American football player and politician (born 1989)

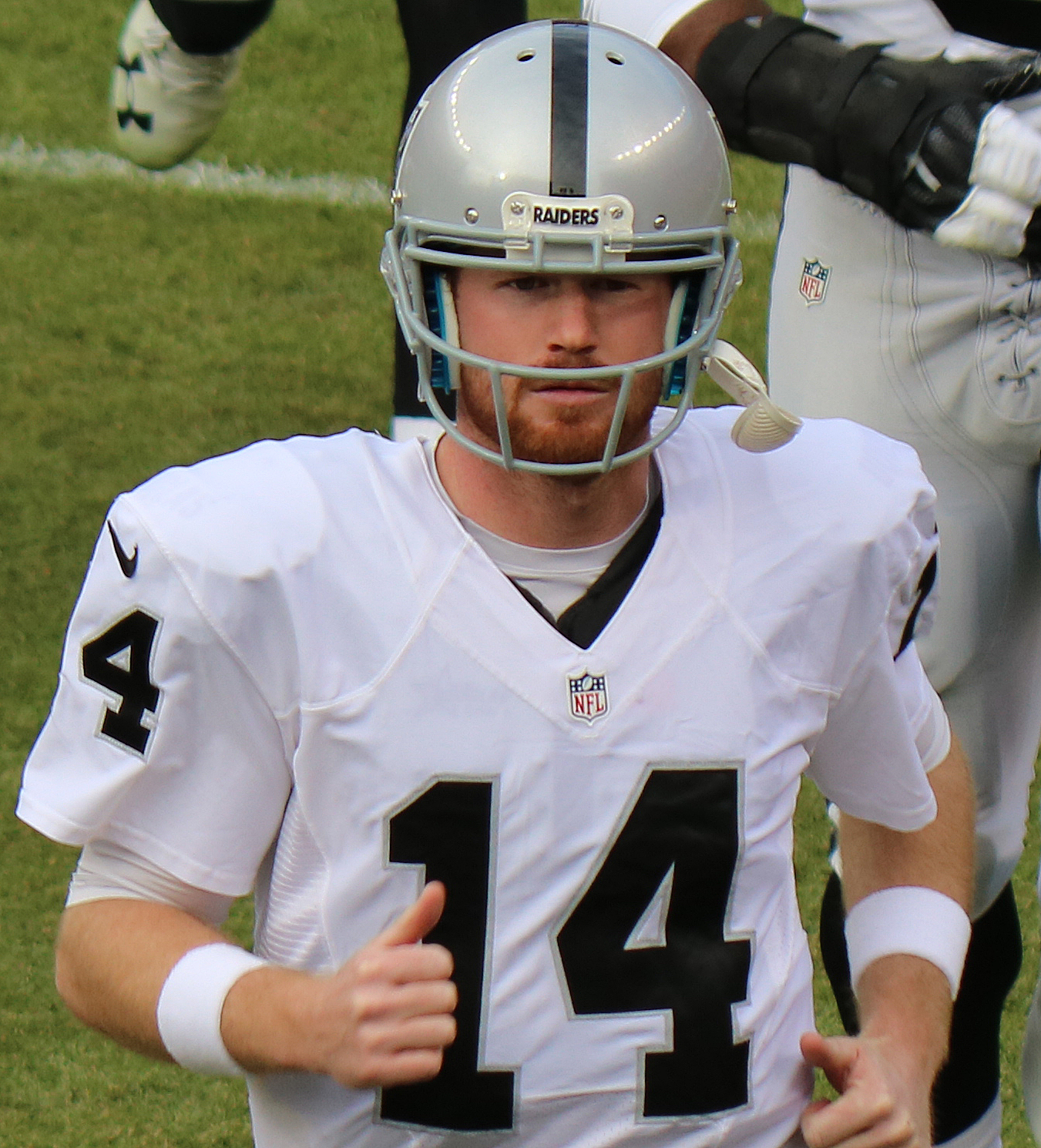
- McGloin with the Oakland Raiders in January 2017

No. 14
- Position: Quarterback

Personal information
- Born: December 2, 1989 (age 36); Scranton, Pennsylvania, U.S.
- Listed height: 6 ft 1 in (1.85 m)
- Listed weight: 218 lb (99 kg)

Career information
- High school: West Scranton
- College: Penn State (2009–2012)
- NFL draft: 2013: undrafted

Career history
- Oakland Raiders (2013–2016); Philadelphia Eagles (2017)*; Houston Texans (2017); Kansas City Chiefs (2018)*; New York Guardians (2020)
- * Offseason or practice squad member only

Awards and highlights
- Burlsworth Trophy (2012)

Career NFL statistics
- Passing attempts: 277
- Passing completions: 161
- Completion percentage: 58.1%
- TD–INT: 11–11
- Passing yards: 1,868
- Passer rating: 75.3
- Stats at Pro Football Reference

Other information

Member of the Lackawanna County Board of Commissioners
- In office January 2, 2024 – February 24, 2025 Serving with Bill Gaughan and Chris Chermak
- Preceded by: Jerry Notarianni; Debi Domenick
- Succeeded by: Thom Welby

Personal details
- Party: Democratic
- Education: Penn State University (BS)

Matthew James McGloin (born December 2, 1989) is an American former professional football player who was a quarterback in the National Football League (NFL). He played college football as the starting quarterback for the Penn State Nittany Lions from 2010 to 2012 and was the first walk-on quarterback to start at Penn State since scholarships were reinstated in 1949. McGloin was signed by the Oakland Raiders as an undrafted free agent in 2013.

Prior to his college career, McGloin was a Pennsylvania all-state quarterback while attending West Scranton High School. McGloin is currently an analyst for the Big Ten Network.

From 2024 to 2025, McGloin was a member of the Lackawanna County Board of Commissioners.

== Early life ==
McGloin was born and raised in Scranton, Pennsylvania. He was a three-sport (football, basketball, and baseball) stand-out at West Scranton High School from 2004 to 2008, earning ten varsity letters. McGloin was a three-year starter at West Scranton, throwing for 5,485 career yards with 58 touchdowns. As the starting quarterback, he led his team to two PIAA Class AAA district titles and a league title. McGloin was named the 2007–08 Athlete of the Year by The Scranton Times-Tribune, who also named him as their Athlete of the Week thrice. McGloin was also a four-year starter and scored 1,300 career points for the school's basketball team and also served as the team captain. He garnered many league and tournament all-star and MVP awards. McGloin was a three-year starter on the varsity baseball team as an infielder and pitcher. During his senior year, McGloin was named all-region as a two-way player. He hit over .400 and led his team in many offensive categories as well as registering a 7–0 record on the mound. In his senior season, McGloin led his high school baseball team to its first conference championship in 16 years. He played on the prestigious Mid Atlantic Prospects summer travel baseball team from Philadelphia.

== College career ==
=== 2009 season ===
McGloin joined the Nittany Lions football team in 2009 as a walk-on. He was a backup in 2009, playing against Syracuse, Eastern Illinois, Michigan, and Michigan State where he had a combined zero completions on two attempts. In the Blue-White game, McGloin was a combined 9-of-13 for 111 yards and threw two touchdowns, one for each team. After playing behind Daryll Clark and Kevin Newsome in 2009, McGloin ended up third on the depth chart in early 2010 behind Rob Bolden, a true freshman from Detroit.

=== 2010 season ===
McGloin was in a three-quarterback competition for the starting job in 2010 with Newsome and Bolden. Bolden won the starting job for the season-opener against Youngstown State, Newsome played in the fourth quarter and scored a touchdown, and McGloin played one play, where he handed off to third-string tailback Curtis Dukes. On October 23, 2010, McGloin played against Minnesota when Kevin Newsome was sidelined with stomach flu and Bolden left the game with a concussion. McGloin threw two touchdowns in Penn State's first Big Ten victory after losses to Illinois and Iowa.

On October 30, McGloin made his first start at quarterback and threw for 250 yards and a touchdown in a 41–31 win over Michigan. Bolden started the next week against Northwestern, but was pulled from the game by coach Joe Paterno after he was sacked twice and lost a fumble. McGloin rallied the Nittany Lions from a 21-point deficit to a 35–21 victory with four touchdown passes, a mark he matched twice his senior year but never surpassed. The victory was also the 400th of Paterno's career.

On November 10, Paterno officially named McGloin the team's starter. On November 13, McGloin scored the first passing touchdowns in Ohio Stadium by a Penn State quarterback since 1963 and put them up 14–3 over the Buckeyes at halftime. He passed for 300+ yards and two touchdowns in both of the final regular-season games against Indiana and Michigan St, but threw five interceptions in a loss to Florida in the 2011 Outback Bowl, including one returned 80 yards for a touchdown on a potential game-winning drive late in the game's last minute. He finished the season 118-of-215, for 1,548 yards, 14 touchdowns, and nine interceptions for a passer rating of 128.5. Despite playing in only 7 of the team's 12 games, he ranked tenth in the conference in completions, attempts, yards, touchdowns, and rating, but tied for 4th in interceptions.

=== 2011 season ===
McGloin split time at quarterback with Rob Bolden much of the 2011 season. He went 14–29 in the blue and white game and led Penn State to a game-winning drive over in-state rival Temple in week 3. McGloin saw increasing playing time through the season, both starting and playing his first complete game in a Week 8 victory over Northwestern. Despite a poor 9-of-24 for 98 yard performance the next week, McGloin's Nittany Lions defeated Illinois 10–7 for coach Joe Paterno's record-breaking 409th career win, and the 8–1 team rose to 12th in the AP Poll on the following bye week. The rest of the season was marred by the Penn State child sex abuse scandal, the team lost three of their last four games, and McGloin did not play in the team's TicketCity Bowl loss to Houston after suffering a concussion during a locker room altercation with receiver Curtis Drake.

Though McGloin took only 2/3 of the team's snaps that season, he led the team and finished ninth in the Big Ten with 125 completions, 231 attempts, a 54.1% completion percentage, 1,571 passing yards, and an efficiency of 118.3. McGloin also had eight touchdown passes (10th in the Big Ten) against only 5 interceptions.

=== 2012 season ===
The arrival of new head coach Bill O'Brien paid huge dividends for McGloin. Though one of three quarterbacks considered for the starting role until just before opening day, McGloin started all 12 games and had a passer efficiency rating over 100 in all of them. In Week 4 against Eastern Michigan, McGloin went 14-of-17 for 220 yards, 3 touchdowns, and no interceptions, for the highest completion percentage (82.4%) and passer efficiency (249.3) by a Penn State quarterback since 2000. On November 17, 2012, in the course of a 395 yard, four-touchdown effort over Illinois, he surpassed Daryll Clark's career record for touchdown passes (45) in Penn State history, Clark's single-season record of 3,003 passing yards, and Anthony Morelli's single-season record of 234 completions.

McGloin finished the season leading the Big Ten with a school-record 270 completions, 446 attempts, 3,271 yards and 24 touchdowns. He earned Honorable Mention All-Big Ten honors and was the 2012 Burlsworth Trophy winner, given by the Rotary Club of Springdale, Arkansas to the most outstanding college football player who began his career as a walk-on.

=== Legacy at Penn State ===
McGloin ended his career at Penn State with a school-record 46 touchdowns, and ranked second in school history to Zack Mills with 513-of-894 for 6,390 yards. His career efficiency of 130.2 is the highest among players with at least 750 pass attempts.

McGloin was honored on the floor of the Pennsylvania House of Representatives by Rep. Marty Flynn in 2013. Flynn cited McGloin's "daily demonstration of grit and tenacity." The Worthington Scranton campus of Penn State University named its baseball field after McGloin.

== Professional career ==
=== Pre-draft ===
McGloin was rated the 22nd best quarterback in the 2013 NFL draft by NFLDraftScout.com.

Pre-draft measurables
Height	Weight	40-yard dash	10-yard split	20-yard split	20-yard shuttle	Three-cone drill	Vertical jump	Broad jump
6 ft 1 in (1.85 m)	207 lb (94 kg)	4.86 s	1.72 s	2.88 s	4.29 s	7.00 s	28 in (0.71 m)	9 ft 0 in (2.74 m)
All values from Penn State Pro Day

=== Oakland Raiders ===
==== 2013 season ====
McGloin was not drafted in the 2013 NFL draft, but was signed as an undrafted free agent by the Oakland Raiders after a visit on May 15, 2013.

McGloin made the team and began the season as the third-string quarterback on the depth chart, behind starter Terrelle Pryor and backup Matt Flynn. After Flynn's disappointing Week 4 showing (starting for an injured Pryor) against the Washington Redskins, McGloin was promoted past Flynn to be Pryor's backup.

On November 3, 2013, McGloin made his first NFL appearance during the fourth quarter of a 49–20 loss to the Philadelphia Eagles. He debuted as the Raiders' starting quarterback two weeks later; along with Buffalo Bills quarterback Jeff Tuel, McGloin was one of two undrafted rookie quarterbacks to start a game in the 2013 season, a historically rare occurrence. McGloin had 197 passing yards and three touchdowns while leading the Raiders to a 28–23 road victory over the Houston Texans. In the next game against the Tennessee Titans, he threw for 260 yards, a touchdown, and an interception during the 23–19 loss. The following week against the Dallas Cowboys on Thanksgiving, McGloin earned praise for his play in the 31–24 road loss and an honorable mention for Phil Simms's "All-Iron Award" for the most valuable player.

Despite consistent play from McGloin, the Raiders lost their next four games, and Pryor retook the starting role for the final game of the season. McGloin's 259.0 passing yards per game is second only to Jake Delhomme in NFL history for an undrafted rookie.

==== 2014 season ====
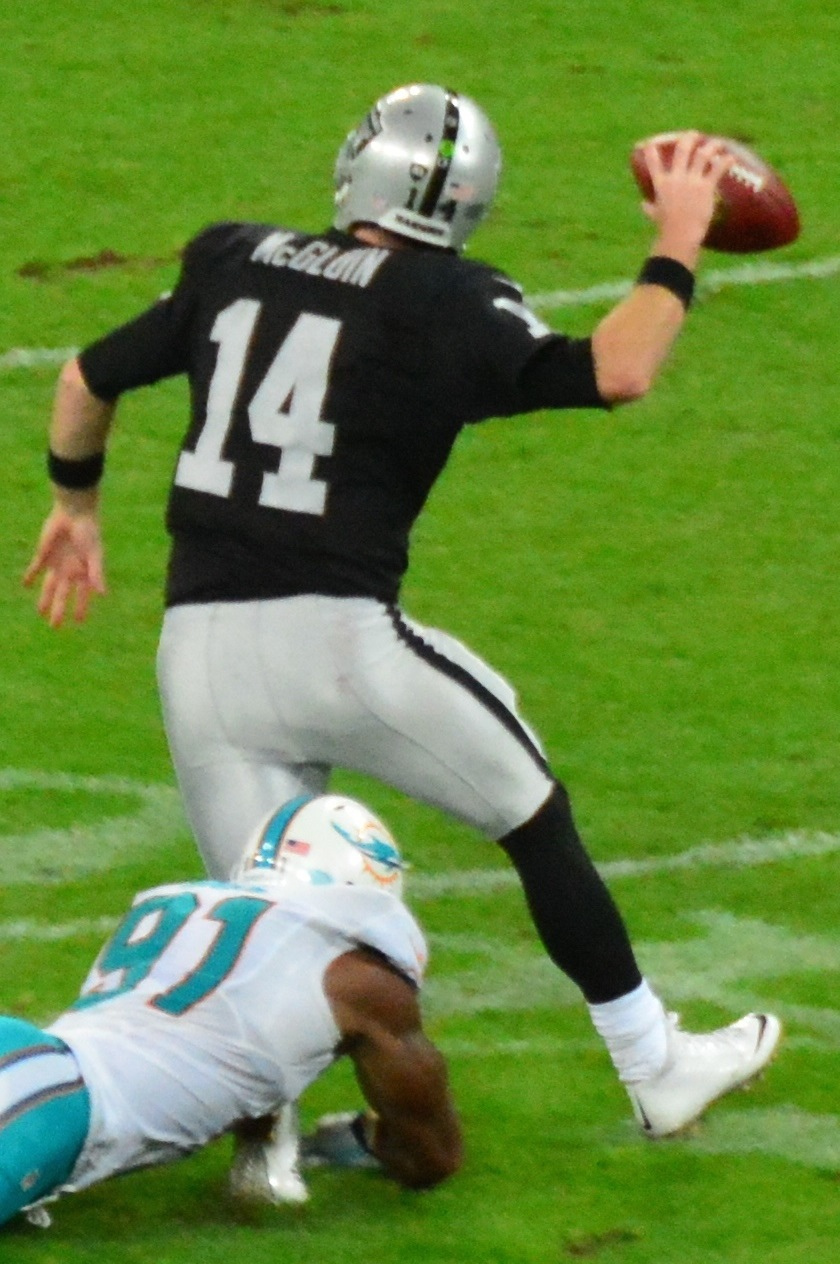
McGloin playing against the Miami Dolphins in 2014

In 2014, McGloin began the season behind rookie quarterback Derek Carr and backup Matt Schaub. He played in just one game, replacing an injured Carr midway through third quarter of a Week 4 38–14 loss to the Miami Dolphins, throwing for 129 yards, a touchdown, and two interceptions.

==== 2015 season ====
In 2015, McGloin was promoted to second-string backup after Schaub was released during the offseason. He played just over two quarters for an injured Carr in the season-opening 33–13 loss to the Cincinnati Bengals, throwing for 142 yards, two touchdowns, and an interception. McGloin appeared in just one other game that season.

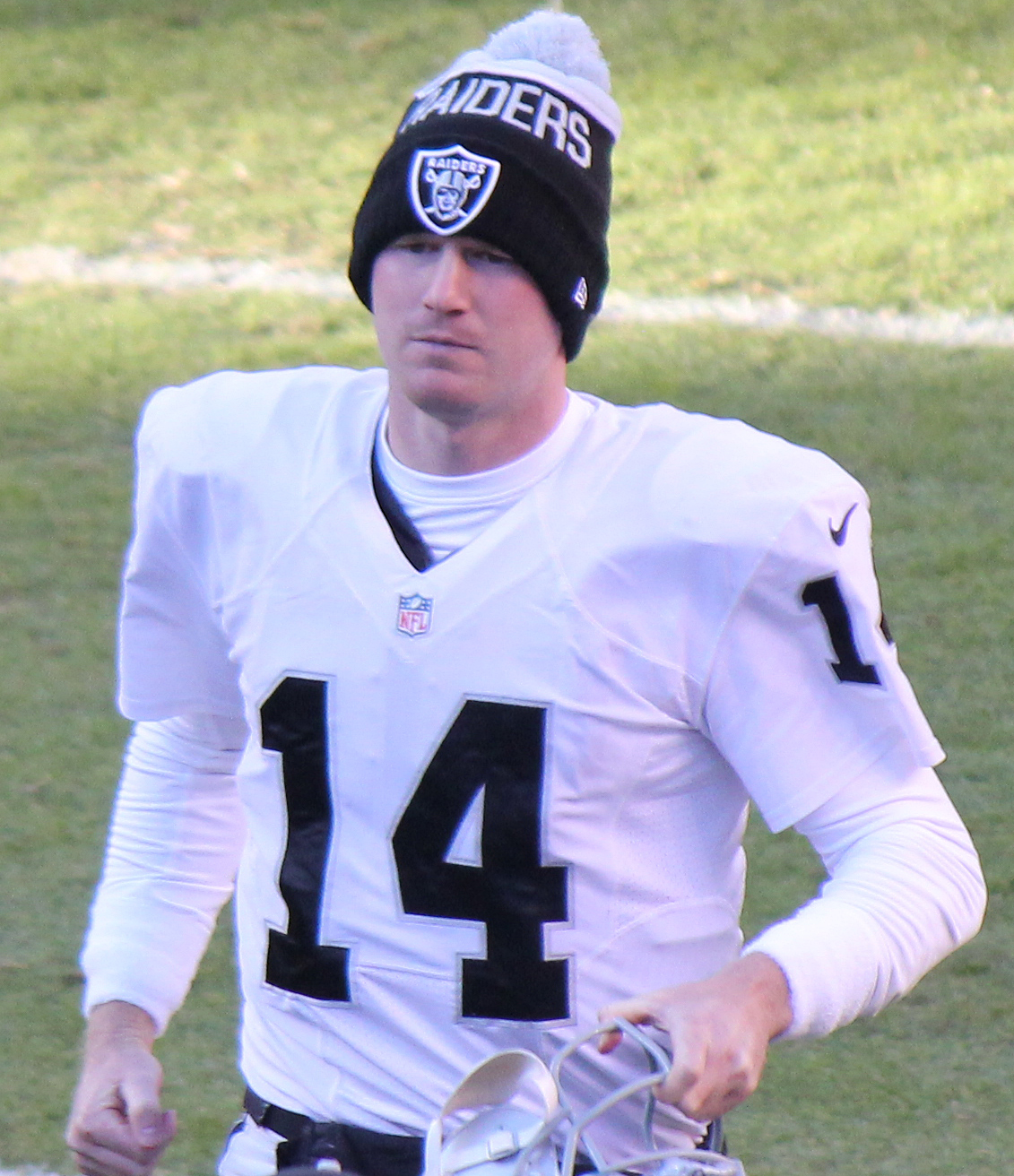
McGloin in 2015

==== 2016 season ====
In 2016, McGloin appeared only briefly in one game in the middle of the season behind a greatly improved Carr. However, during a Week 16 33–25 victory over the Indianapolis Colts on Christmas Eve, Carr suffered a broken right fibula early in the fourth quarter on his only sack with an expected recovery time of six to eight weeks. On January 1, 2017, McGloin made his first start since 2013, completing six of 11 passes for 21 yards before suffering a shoulder injury late in the second quarter and being replaced by rookie Connor Cook in a 24–6 road loss to the Denver Broncos, which cost the Raiders the AFC West championship and a first-round bye. Three days later, Cook was named the starter for the AFC Wildcard Game against the Texans. McGloin was limited in practice due to his injury but was still active as Cook's backup for the playoff game. McGloin did not see any action in the playoff game as the Raiders lost on the road by a score of 27–14.

=== Philadelphia Eagles ===
On April 10, 2017, McGloin signed a one-year deal with the Philadelphia Eagles. He was released on September 1.

=== Houston Texans ===
On November 3, 2017, McGloin and T. J. Yates were both signed by the Houston Texans after a season-ending ACL injury to starter Deshaun Watson. Head coach Bill O'Brien said that Yates would be the backup to Tom Savage for the November 5 game against the Colts, making McGloin the third-string quarterback. He was released on November 7 after the team signed Josh Johnson.

=== Kansas City Chiefs ===
On March 30, 2018, McGloin was signed by the Kansas City Chiefs. He was released on September 2.

McGloin declined to sign with the Alliance of American Football, which began play in February 2019 before it ceased operations in April 2019.

=== New York Guardians ===
On October 15, 2019, McGloin was allocated to the New York Guardians of the XFL as part of the league's 2020 XFL draft. He signed a contract with the team on November 4.

Despite losing his starting position to Luis Perez midway through the league's inaugural season due to a rib injury and a feud with coaching staff, McGloin spoke positively of his experience in the league after it was forced to suspend operations due to the COVID-19 pandemic, stating that "It was great while it lasted... I really enjoyed the opportunity they gave me to go out and be a professional player again and to be 'the guy' again, if only for a short time." McGloin had his contract terminated when the league suspended operations on April 10, 2020.

== Career statistics ==
=== NFL ===
Year	Team	Games			Passing								Rushing				Sacks		Fumbles (Note: Fumbles lost data taken from Pro Football Reference career game log)	
Year	Team	GP	GS	Record	Cmp	Att	Pct	Yds	Y/A	TD	Int	Rtg	Att	Yds	Avg	TD	Sck	SckY	Fum	Lost
2013	OAK	7	6	1–5	118	211	55.9	1,547	7.3	8	8	76.1	11	27	2.5	0	6	53	4	1
2014	OAK	1	0	–	12	19	63.2	129	6.8	1	2	61.0	2	3	1.5	0	1	8	0	0
2015	OAK	2	0	–	23	32	71.9	142	4.4	2	1	88.3	0	0	0.0	0	2	20	1	1
2016	OAK	3	1	0–1	8	15	53.3	50	3.3	0	0	60.4	3	-3	-1.0	0	0	0	0	0
Career		13	7	1–6	161	277	58.1	1,868	6.7	11	11	75.3	16	27	1.7	0	9	81	5	2

=== College ===
Season	Team	Passing								Rushing			
Season	Team	Cmp	Att	Pct	Yds	Y/A	TD	Int	Rtg	Att	Yds	Avg	TD
2009	Penn State	0	2	0.0	0	0.0	0	0	0.0	0	0	0.0	0
2010	Penn State	118	215	54.9	1,548	7.2	14	9	128.5	13	6	0.5	2
2011	Penn State	125	231	54.1	1,571	6.8	8	5	118.3	24	−12	−0.5	0
2012	Penn State	270	446	60.5	3,271	7.3	24	9	137.7	59	−51	−0.9	5
Career		513	894	57.4	6,390	7.1	46	19	130.2	96	−57	−0.6	7

== Post-playing career ==
=== Broadcasting ===
In 2019, McGloin began working alongside Shaun Gayle and Dallas Clark as in-studio analysts for Sky Sports’ NFL broadcasts. In 2021, McGloin worked as a college football analyst for the Big Ten Network. He continued his work for the Big Ten Network into 2022 as a sideline reporter.

=== Lackawanna County Board of Commissioners ===
In September 2022, Matt McGloin declared he would be running for county commissioner of Lackawanna County, Pennsylvania as a Democratic candidate. He was elected to one of three seats on the Board of Commissioners with over 32% of the vote on November 7, 2023. McGloin was sworn in as vice-chairman of the Board of Commissioners on January 2, 2024. He resigned on February 24, 2025, to join the Boston College Eagles football team as an offensive analyst. However, he resigned from Boston College two days later for personal reasons.

2023 Lackawanna County commissioner general election
Party	Candidate	Votes	%
Democratic	Bill Gaughan	31,851	32.3%
Democratic	Matt McGloin	31,729	32.1%
Republican	Chris Chermak (Incumbent)	19,124	19.4%
Republican	Diana Campbell	16,022	16.2%
Total votes		98,726	100.0%

McGloin is currently employed as a wealth counselor with Abundance Wealth Counseling LLC.

== Personal life ==
McGloin is the youngest of three children. He was born to Paul and Catherine McGloin on December 2, 1989. McGloin has two older brothers, Paul and John.

McGloin completed his degree in broadcast journalism in May 2012, prior to his senior season at Penn State. As of 2012, McGloin resided in Scranton, Pennsylvania, with his wife, Bailey Amos. They have one son, who was born in 2019.
