= BNB =

BNB may refer to:

== People ==
- Bad News Barrett (born 1980), English professional wrestler
- Bad News Brown (musician) (1977–2011), Canadian musician of Haitian origin

== Culture ==
- Bachs Notenbibliothek, K. Beißwenger's 1992 compendium listing music manuscripts and printed music owned by J. S. Bach
- Biographie Nationale de Belgique, the Belgian national biography
- Bomb and Bubble (BnB), a player mode in the Korean game Crazy Arcade
- British National Bibliography, the national bibliography for the United Kingdom and Ireland

== Finance ==
- Banco Nacional de Bolivia, a Bolivian bank and financial services company
- Banque Nationale de Belgique, the National Bank of Belgium
- Barbados National Bank, part of Republic Bank
- Bulgarian National Bank
- BNB, the native cryptocurrency on the BNB Chain

== Other uses ==
- Branch and Bound, an algorithm design paradigm for discrete or combinatorial problems
- Bed and breakfast (sometimes spelled BnB)
- Bikes Not Bombs
- The IATA code of Boende Airport
- British North Borneo
