= Michael Needham =

Michael Needham may refer to:

- Michael Needham (politician), member of the Pennsylvania House of Representatives
- Michael Needham (political advisor), counselor of the United States Department of State
- Mike Needham, Canadian ice hockey player
