= Death of Anita Grayson =

2026 death in Fort Wayne, Indiana, US

Anita Grayson died in an altercation with a manager at a Tim Hortons restaurant in Fort Wayne, Indiana, US in May 2026. The incident sparked national news coverage. She was 75 years old. It was announced in August 2026 that charges would not filed in her death. The Allen County Prosecutor's Office stated that Grayson instigated the encounter and not the manager. The incident started over an issue with a drive thru order. The Allen County Coroner's Office said her cause of death was congestive heart failure. The prosecutor's office released footage of the incident that led to Grayson's death.
