= Kevin P. Murphy =

American politician

Member of the Pennsylvania House of Representatives from the 113th district
- In office January 6, 2009 – January 2, 2013
- Preceded by: Frank Andrews Shimkus
- Succeeded by: Marty Flynn

Personal details
- Born: 1965 (age 60–61) Scranton, Pennsylvania
- Party: Democratic
- Spouse: Denise Murphy
- Children: 4
- Education: University of Scranton
- Occupation: Insurance Agent

Kevin P. Murphy (born 1965) is a former Democratic member of the Pennsylvania House of Representatives. As a freshman legislator, he regularly worked at his district office's unique drive-through window designed to speed constituent service.
