= Pennsylvania House of Representatives, District 113 =

American legislative district

Pennsylvania's 113th State House of Representatives district
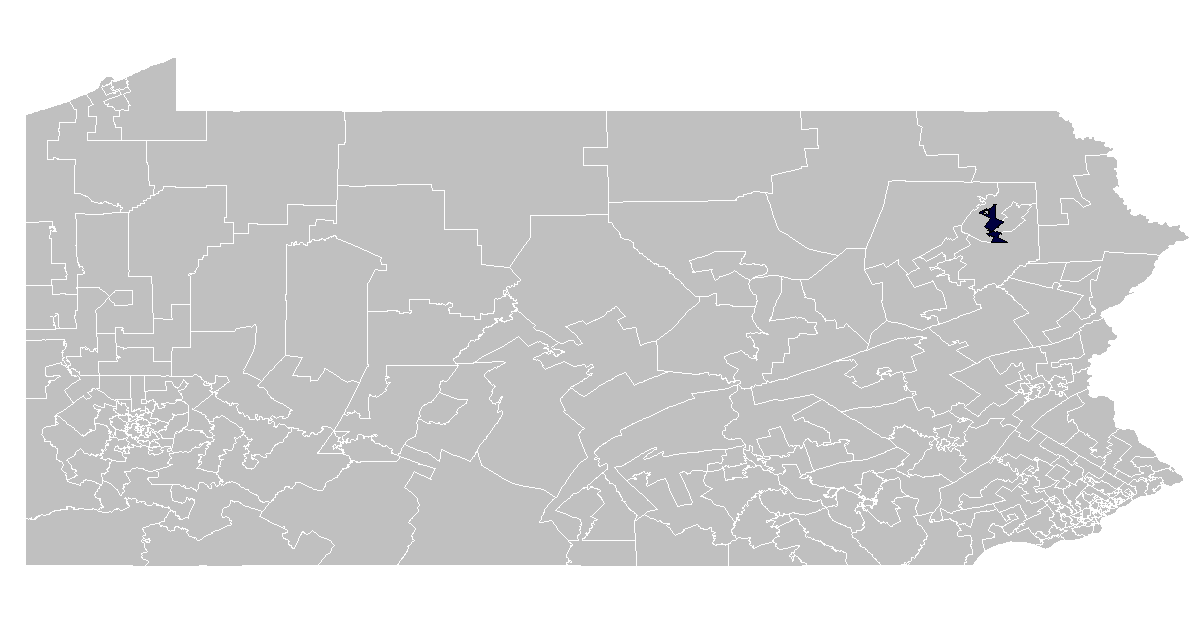
Representative
Kyle Donahue; D–Scranton

The 113th Pennsylvania House of Representatives District is located in Lackawanna County and includes the following areas:

- Clarks Green
- Scranton (PART)
  - Ward 01
  - Ward 02
  - Ward 03
  - Ward 04
  - Ward 05
  - Ward 06
  - Ward 07
  - Ward 13
  - Ward 14
  - Ward 15
  - Ward 16
  - Ward 19 [PART, Divisions 03 and 04]
  - Ward 20
  - Ward 21
  - Ward 22
  - Ward 23
  - Ward 24
- South Abington Township

== Representatives ==
Representative	Party	Years	District home	Note
Prior to 1969, seats were apportioned by county.
Michael J. Needham	Democrat	1969 – 1972	Scranton	
Thomas P. Walsh	Democrat	1973 – 1976	Scranton	
Frank J. Zitterman	Democrat	1977 – 1980	Dickson City	
Gaynor Cawley	Democrat	1981 – 2006	Scranton	
Frank Andrews Shimkus	Democrat	2007 – 2008	Throop	
Kevin P. Murphy	Democrat	2009 – 2012	Scranton	
Marty Flynn	Democrat	2013 – 2021	Scranton	Resigned after being elected to vacant 22nd District State Senate left by John Blake in a special election
Thom Welby	Democrat	2021 – 2023		Elected to fill vacant seat left by predecessor in special election
Kyle Donahue	Democrat	2023 – present		Incumbent
