= B-Bop's =

Fast food restaurant chain in Iowa, U.S.

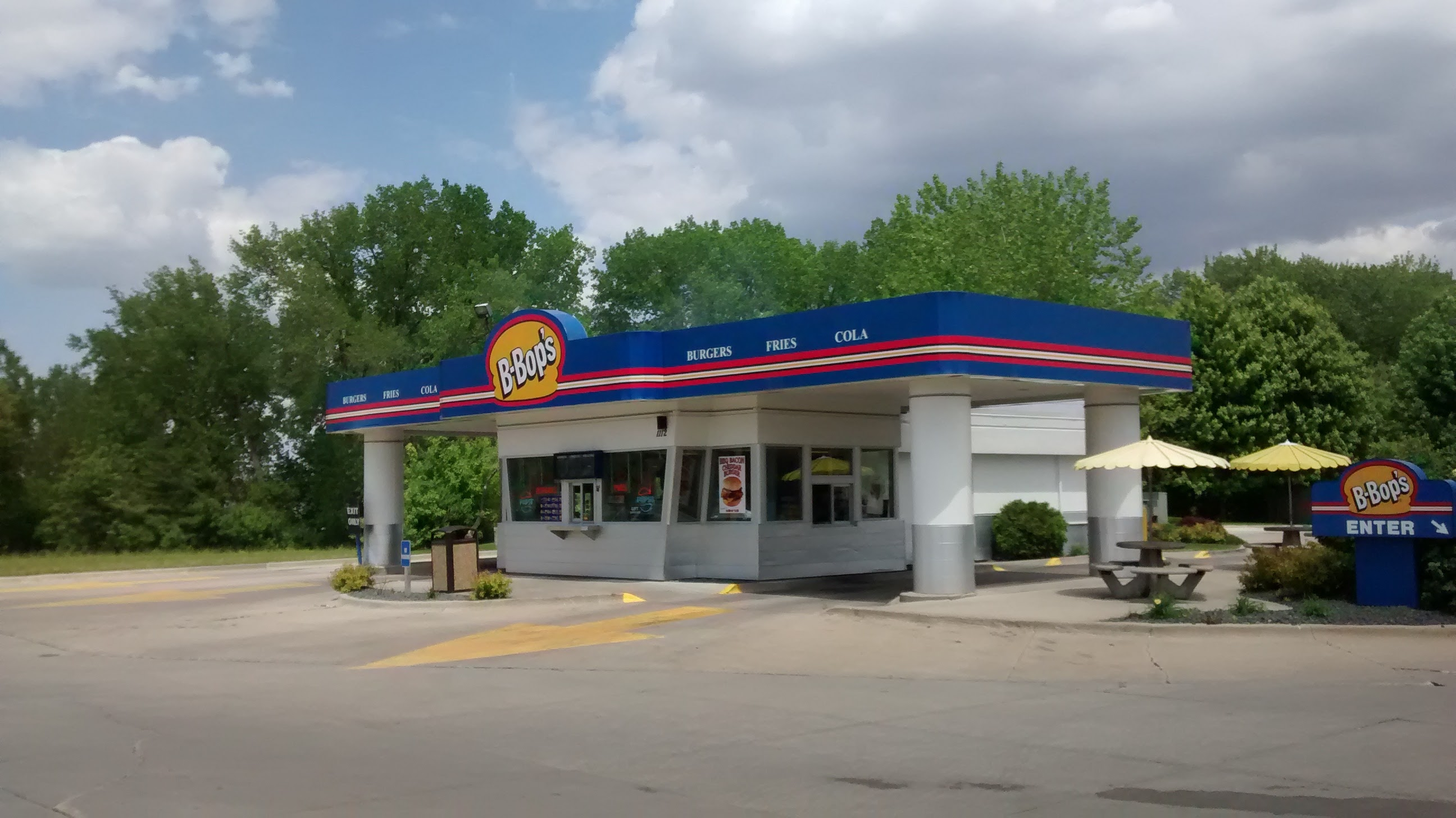
- B-Bop's in Ames, Iowa
- Industry: Fast food
- Founded: November 26, 1988; Des Moines, Iowa
- Number of locations: 13 (2025)
- Products: Hamburger, cheeseburger, french fries, pork tenderloin sandwich, chocolate shakes, and other fast-food
- Website: b-bops.com

B-Bop's, Inc. is a double drive-thru 1950s themed casual fast food restaurant chain, with franchise locations in Iowa.

== History ==
B-Bop's was created by Bob Johnson in 1988. The first B-Bop's was located at 1500 East Euclid, Des Moines, Iowa, as Johnson saw it as the ideal location to build a double drive-thru. That location has now been demolished after Bob Johnson built a new B-Bops around the corner on East 14th St. The chain began franchising in 1994.

Today, there are thirteen B-Bop's locations in Iowa, ten of which are in the Des Moines area, along with two in Ames and one in Cedar Rapids.

== Awards ==
B-Bop's has won Cityview's Best of Des Moines award in the category of Best Burger for twenty six years in a row. B-Bop's was also a runner-up for Best French Fry for Cityview's Best of Des Moines awards for the past five years and 2016 runner up for best hangover food.
