= Frank Zitterman =

American politician

Frank J. Zitterman

Member of the Pennsylvania House of Representatives from the 113th district
- In office 1977–1980
- Preceded by: Thomas P. Walsh
- Succeeded by: Gaynor Cawley

Personal details
- Born: February 1, 1932 Dickson City, Pennsylvania
- Died: April 26, 1993 (aged 61) Pinellas County, Florida
- Party: Democratic

Francis "Frank" J. Zitterman (February 1, 1932 – April 26, 1993) was a Democratic member of the Pennsylvania House of Representatives. He was born in Dickson City.
