= Frank Andrews Shimkus =

American politician

Member of the Pennsylvania House of Representatives from the 113th district
- In office January 2, 2007 – November 19, 2008
- Preceded by: Gaynor Cawley
- Succeeded by: Kevin Murphy

Personal details
- Born: 1952 (age 73–74) Scranton, Pennsylvania
- Party: Democratic
- Spouse(s): Gabrielle AP Shimkus, LPC
- Education: University of Scranton; Antietam Bible College
- Occupation: Broadcaster, pastor

Frank Andrews Shimkus (born 1952) is a retired broadcaster and Democratic politician in Pennsylvania.

Shimkus grew up in the High Works neighborhood of Scranton. He graduated from the University of Scranton in 1973 with a degree in English. He then went into broadcasting, despite the misgivings of his father (who thought broadcasters were carnies). After working as an announcer at WEJL in Scranton and WCAU in Philadelphia, he went into television. He served as an anchor and reporter at WNEP-TV in Scranton from 1980 to 1998, doubling for much of that time as news director. After a brief two-year hiatus, he moved to WYOU as anchor and assistant news director. During his broadcasting career, he was known on-air as "Frank Andrews."

While still at WNEP, Shimkus earned a master's degree in theology from Antietam Bible College in 1993 and a doctorate in biblical studies from the same institution two years later. He currently serves as the part-time pastor of Trinity Congregational United Church of Christ in Scranton.

Shimkus resigned from WYOU in March 2006 to run for the Pennsylvania House of Representatives, winning a 5-way Democratic primary to succeed the retiring Gaynor Cawley in a district that included almost 60 percent of Scranton. He went on to easily win the general election.

His bid for a second term was derailed by disputes over his residency. He'd lived in South Abington Township, a suburb of Scranton, for many years. Midway through his term, he moved in with his fiancee in Throop on the advice of his doctors, who suggested he shouldn't live alone after suffering several concussions. He listed a house in Scranton owned by his daughter and son-in-law as his primary residence when he filed for the Democratic primary. Shimkus' primary opponent, former Scranton city councilman Kevin Murphy, and two others filed a petition to have Shimkus thrown off the ballot citing the residency issue. The Scranton and Throop houses are in the district. Nevertheless, a Commonwealth Court judge granted the petition on March 14, 2008; finding that Shimkus intentionally misrepresented his address. Since no Republican even filed in this heavily Democratic district, this appeared to hand the nomination—and the seat—to Murphy.

In an unusual move, Shimkus then mounted a write-in bid for both the Democratic and Republican nominations. He lost the Democratic primary to Murphy by only 107 votes, but easily won the Republican primary. However, he stated that he intended to remain a Democrat. In the November election, Shimkus lost to Murphy by only 1,300 votes.

In early 2017 Throop Borough Council elected Shimkus to mayor when then mayor Wayne Williams stepped down to take a seat on council. On May 16, 2017, Shimkus was re-elected mayor of Throop by town residents on the democratic ticket. He won 400 to 307 over challenger Joe Tropiak. Shimkus was reelected on the general election. Due to FCC regulations Shimkus resigned as Throop Mayor a year later in order to take a talk radio position at WILK. Shimkus retired from WILK radio in late 2022 after about five years on the job.
