= Thom Welby =

American politician

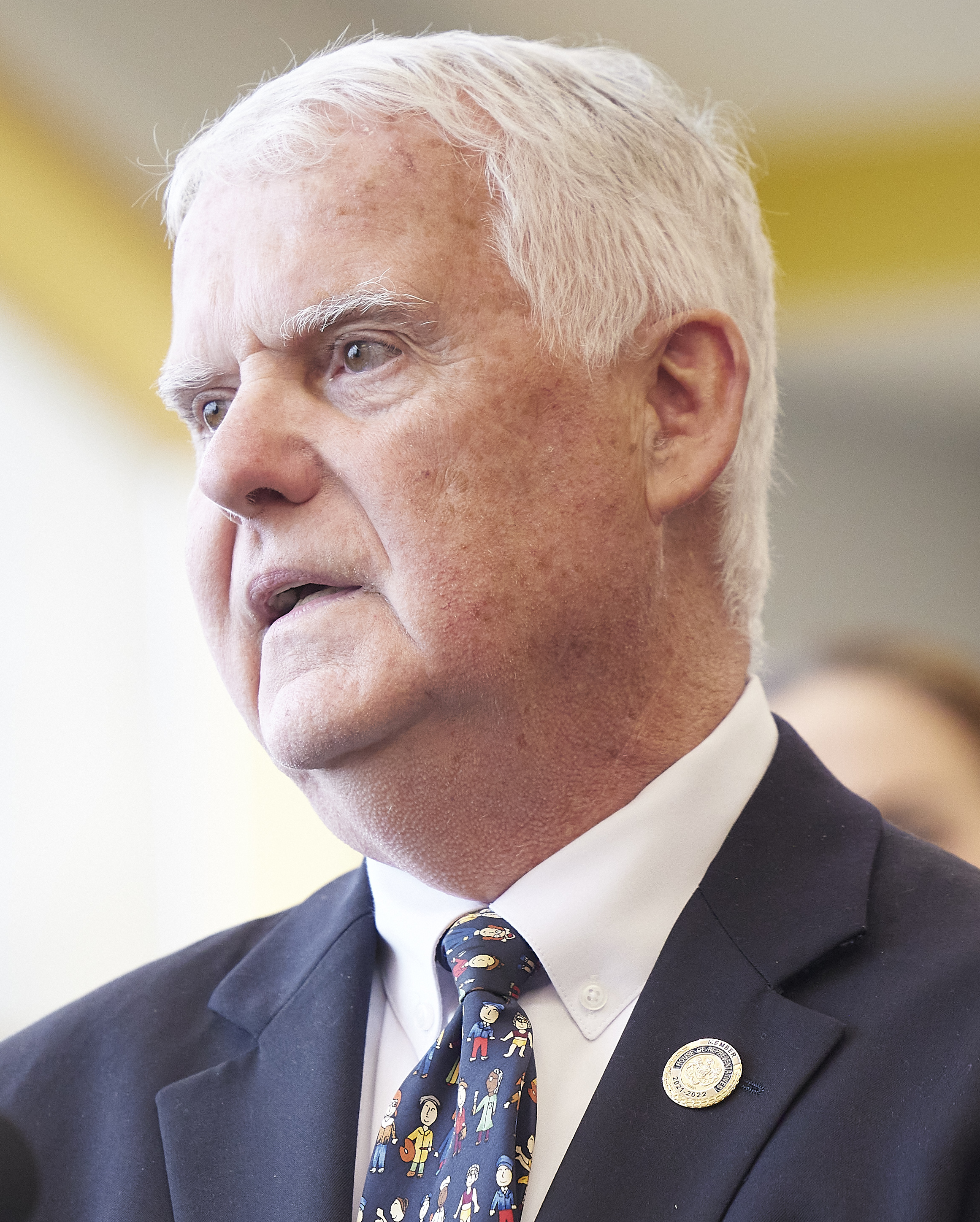

Member of the Lackawanna County Board of Commissioners
- Incumbent
- Assumed office November 25, 2025 Serving with Bill Gaughan and Chris Chermak
- Preceded by: Matt McGloin

Member of the Pennsylvania House of Representatives from the 113th district
- In office November 17, 2021 – November 30, 2022
- Preceded by: Marty Flynn
- Succeeded by: Kyle Donahue

Personal details
- Party: Democratic
- Spouse: Kathleen

Thom Welby is an American politician and broadcaster who is a member of the Lackawanna County Board of Commissioners. A Democrat, he served as a member of the Pennsylvania House of Representatives for the 113th district from 2021 until 2022.

== Career ==
Before working for Marty Flynn, Thom Welby worked in both radio and television broadcasting. In 2013, he started working for Flynn. When Flynn was elected to the Pennsylvania State Senate in a special election early in 2021, Welby decided to run for his now-vacant seat in the Pennsylvania State House. He handily defeated Republican Challenger Dominick Manetti in the Special Election on November 2, 2021, and was sworn in on November 17 of the same year.

Welby currently sits on the Game & Fisheries and Liquor Control committees.

Welby had declined to run for a full term, opting solely to finish Flynn's unexpired term. He was succeeded by Kyle Donahue.

In 2025, Welby won a special election to fill the unexpired term of Lackawanna County Commissioner Matt McGloin.
