= Thomas P. Walsh =

American politician

Member of the Pennsylvania House of Representatives from the 113th district
- In office 1973–1976
- Preceded by: Michael Needham
- Succeeded by: Frank Zitterman

Personal details
- Born: October 19, 1939 (age 86) Scranton, Pennsylvania
- Party: Democratic

Thomas P. Walsh (born October 19, 1939) is a former Democratic member of the Pennsylvania House of Representatives. He was born in Scranton, Pennsylvania.
