= Marty Flynn =

American politician (born 1975)

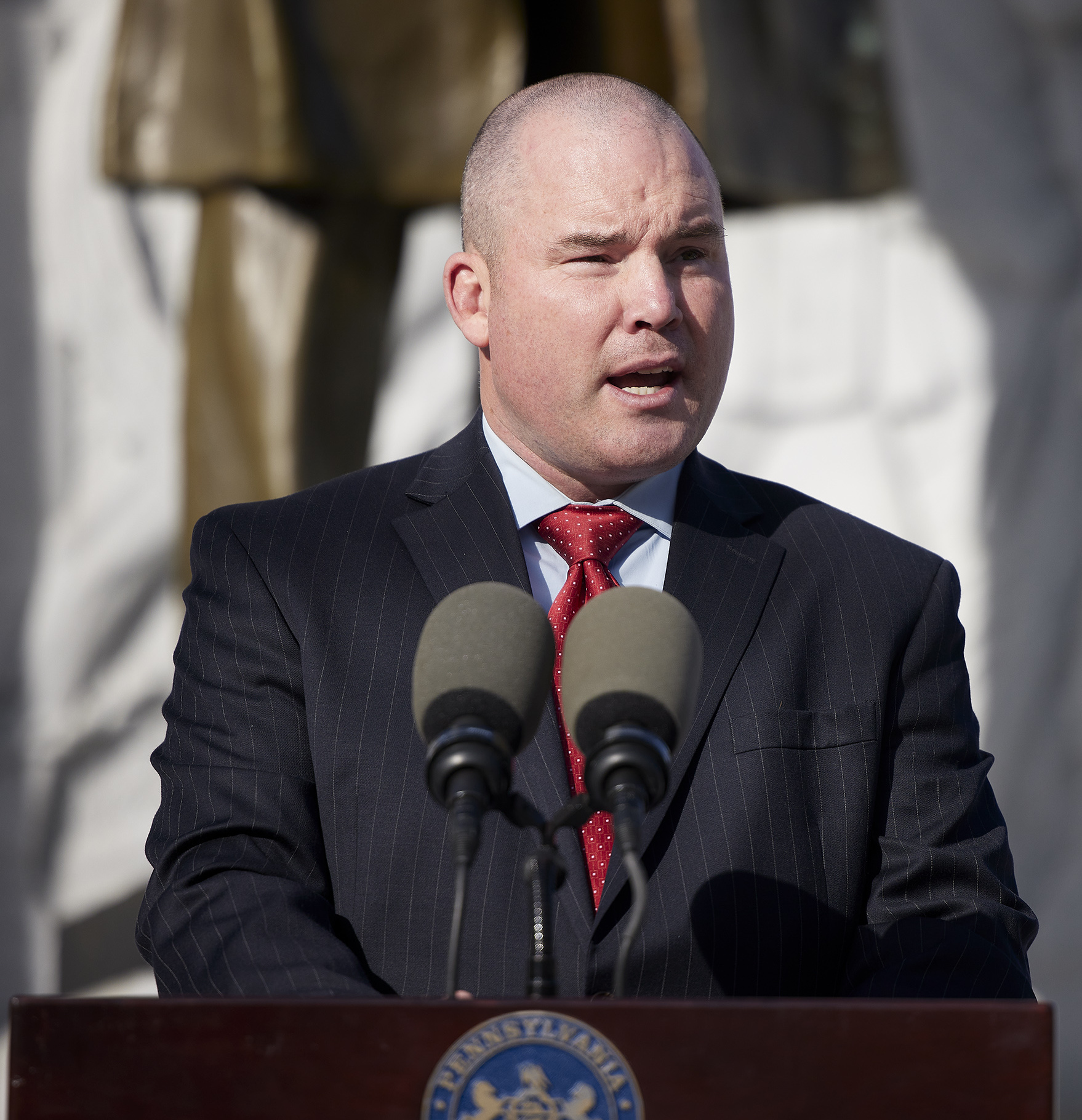
- Flynn in 2021

Member of the Pennsylvania Senate from the 22nd district
- Incumbent
- Assumed office June 9, 2021
- Preceded by: John Blake

Member of the Pennsylvania House of Representatives from the 113th district
- In office January 1, 2013 – June 9, 2021
- Preceded by: Kevin P. Murphy
- Succeeded by: Thom Welby

Personal details
- Born: Martin Bradshaw Flynn Jr. September 18, 1975 (age 50) Scranton, Pennsylvania, U.S.
- Party: Democratic
- Education: University of Scranton; Marywood University (BA)

Martin Bradshaw "Marty" Flynn Jr. (born September 18, 1975) is an American politician. He is a member of the Pennsylvania State Senate and he previously served in the Pennsylvania House of Representatives. Flynn is a member of the Democratic Party.

Flynn graduated from Scranton Preparatory School and Marywood University before becoming a professional boxer and mixed martial arts fighter. Flynn worked as a prison guard before winning election to the Pennsylvania House to represent the 113th district in 2012. In 2021, Flynn won a special election to represent the 22nd district of the Pennsylvania Senate.

== Early life and career ==
Martin Bradshaw Flynn Jr. is from Scranton, Pennsylvania. He attended Scranton Preparatory School, and graduated in 1994. While at Scranton Prep, he played football, basketball, and baseball. Flynn enrolled at the University of Scranton, and transferred to Marywood University. He graduated from Marywood with a bachelor's degree in legal studies in 1999.

While he attended Marywood, Flynn became involved in boxing. He received a scholarship from USA Boxing. Flynn competed in the Golden Gloves, and won the Pennsylvania Golden Gloves in the Novice 178-pound (81 kg) division in 1997. He commuted from Scranton to North Philadelphia to train at a gym where he became the sparring partner for Bernard Hopkins while Hopkins trained for fights against Oscar De La Hoya and Félix Trinidad. Flynn turned professional in the middleweight division in 2000. Hopkins co-managed Flynn. Flynn won his first seven fights and retired from boxing with a 10–2 record, including five knockouts, between 2001 and 2007. A broken elbow and a separated shoulder kept him from fighting from 2003 to 2006. He debuted in amateur mixed martial arts in 2009. He also coached the wrestling team at Scranton Prep.

Flynn became a prison guard at the Lackawanna County Prison in August 2002. In September 2007, he was promoted to inmate education and program coordinator. Flynn also served as chairman of the prison misconduct board. Flynn also owned a bar from 2002 through 2009 and was co-owner of a paving company from 2004 to 2012.

== Political career ==
=== Pennsylvania House of Representatives ===
In January 2012, Flynn announced his candidacy for the Democratic Party's primary election for the 113th legislative district in the Pennsylvania House of Representatives, challenging incumbent Representative Kevin P. Murphy. After a complaint was filed with the United States Office of Special Counsel alleging that Flynn's candidacy and government employment constituted a violation of the Hatch Act, an attorney from the office informed Flynn that he was in violation and needed to choose between his job and his candidacy. Flynn resigned his position with the Lackawanna County Prison and continued his candidacy. In the April primary election, Flynn defeated Murphy with 4,306 votes to 4,065 (51.4% to 48.6%). He was not opposed by a Republican Party candidate in the November general election. Flynn was sworn into office on January 1, 2013. He was assigned to the House Aging and Older Adult Services, Commerce, and State Government committees.

Flynn faced a primary challenge in 2014 from Scranton truck driver Lee Morgan. Flynn defeated Morgan with 80% of the vote in May 2014 and won a second term in November 2014 with 75% of the vote against Republican Marcel Lisi. Flynn co-sponsored a bill to legalize industrial hemp in 2015. He won a third term in 2016 against Republican David Burgerhoff with 69% of the vote (18,561 versus 8,223). Flynn was reelected without opposition when he ran for his fourth term in 2018. He defeated Republican William Kresge in the 2020 election, receiving 68.1% of votes cast.

Flynn served on the Regional Recovery Task Force of Lackawanna County during the COVID-19 pandemic. On May 9, 2020, Flynn posted retort against business owners who were criticizing Pennsylvania Democrats for their handling of the pandemic on his personal Facebook page, stating "Keep talking about how bad we Democrats are and WE will STOP supporting YOUR businesses. You want to make it PERSONAL and we WILL". After being criticized for his post, Flynn removed and apologized for the "juvenile" post and for taking the criticism personally.

=== Pennsylvania Senate ===
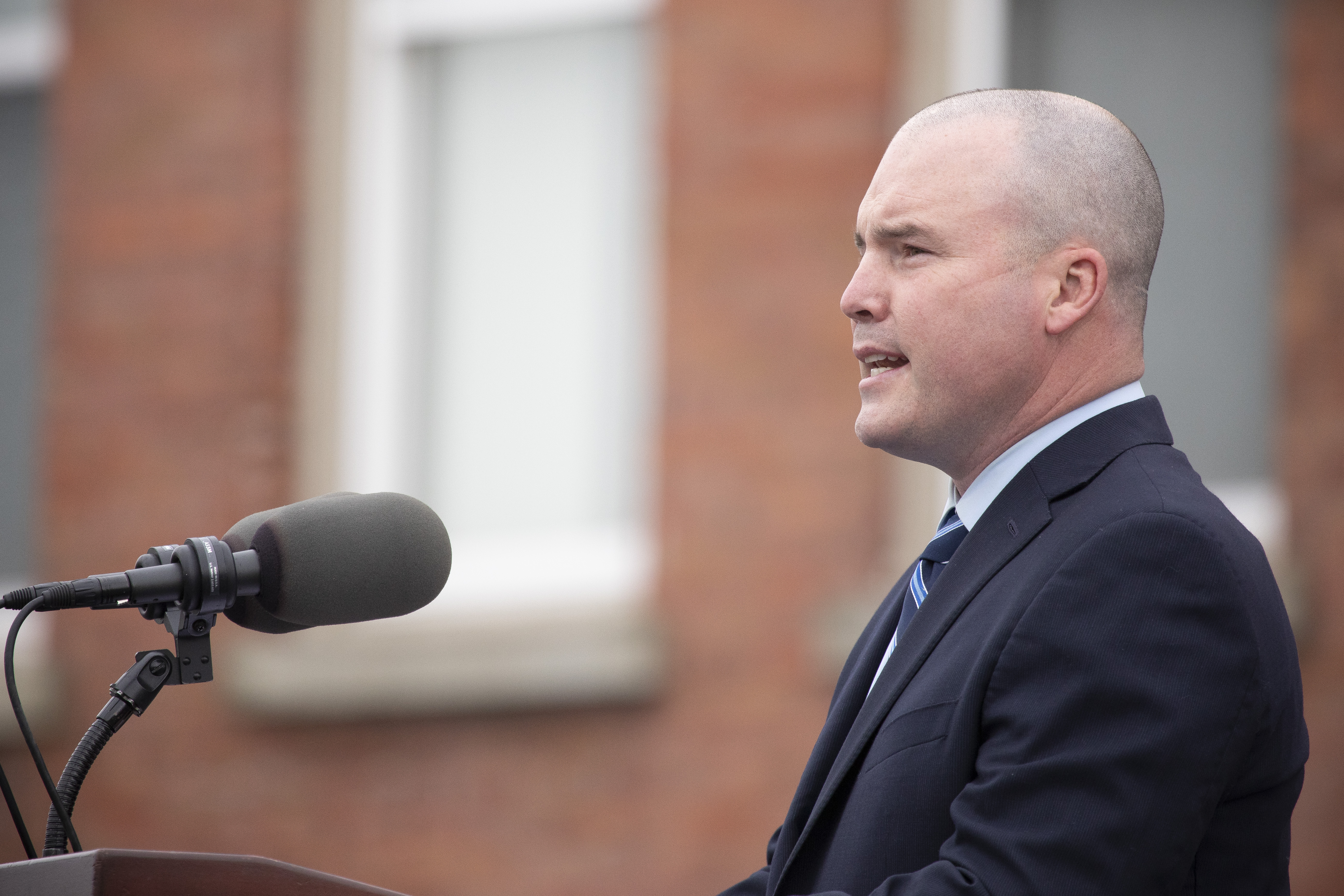
Flynn in 2021

On February 14, 2021, Democratic State Senator John Blake announced he would be resigning as Senator of the 22nd senatorial district to take a position in the office of U.S. Representative Matt Cartwright. Flynn and Representative Kyle Mullins of the 112th district both sought the Democratic nomination in the special election to succeed Blake. On March 13, Democrats held a special convention where members of the local Democratic Party committees selected a nominee. Flynn won the party's nomination by a vote of 206 to 118. In the special election, held on May 18, Flynn received 51.2% of the vote, defeating Republican Chris Chermak, a county commissioner in Lackawanna County, who received 38.5%, while Marlene Sebastianelli of the Green Party received 9.2% of the vote and Nathan Covington of the Libertarian Party received 1.1%.

Flynn was sworn in to the Senate on June 9. He was succeeded in the state house by Thom Welby, his former chief of staff. In the state senate, Flynn is the minority chair of the finance committee, and serves on the appropriations, Community, Economic and Recreational Development, and Transportation committees. Following a report that the Pennsylvania Turnpike Commission failed to collect $104 million in unpaid tolls in 2020, Flynn, who serves as the ranking Democrat on the Senate Transportation Committee, filed legislation to reform their method of toll collection in January 2022. In February 2022, Flynn filed legislation that would allow judges to compel people convicted of driving under the influence of having to pay child support for a child if their parent was killed by the drunk driver. In 2025, he broke party lines to vote in favor of banning transgender girls from women's sports.

For the 2025-2026 Session Flynn serves on the following committees in the State Senate:

- Transportation (Minority Chair)
- Banking & Insurance
- Consumer Protection & Professional Licensure
- Labor & Industry
- Law & Justice

== Personal life ==
Both Flynn's father and grandfather were boxers. In 2019, Flynn's partner, Kate Kochanski, gave birth to a daughter.

In August 2013, Flynn saw a man peeking in a window of a house in his neighborhood of West Scranton late at night. He approached the man, who ran. Flynn gave chase and caught him with the help of an off-duty police officer who Flynn alerted. The prowler was arrested.

On October 15, 2014, Flynn and Representative Ryan Bizzarro were near the Pennsylvania State Capitol after having a late dinner when an assailant approached and demanded their wallets at gunpoint. Flynn said that he froze, but Bizzarro fidgeted, leading the assailant to draw on Bizzarro. He reached for his concealed pistol, a Smith & Wesson Bodyguard 380, and a spotter warned the assailant, who Flynn said shot at Bizzarro. Flynn fired two shots at the assailant. Nobody was injured and police nearby arrested four teenagers. After investigating the shooting, the Harrisburg Police Department said that Flynn acted appropriately.

Flynn had a loaded handgun, a SIG Sauer P229, stolen from his car in July 2021. Several days later, the gun was used in a shooting.
