= Kyle Donahue (politician) =

American politician (born 1986)

Member of the Pennsylvania House of Representatives from the 113th district
- Incumbent
- Assumed office January 3, 2023
- Preceded by: Thom Welby

Personal details
- Born: February 23, 1986 (age 40)
- Party: Democratic

Kyle Donahue is an American politician. A Democrat, he serves as a member of the Pennsylvania House of Representatives for the 113th district after his election in 2023.

== Career ==
Donahue previously served on the City Council for Scranton.
