= Michael Needham (politician) =

American politician

Michael J. Needham

Member of the Pennsylvania House of Representatives
- In office 1969–1972
- Preceded by: District created
- Succeeded by: Thomas P. Walsh
- Constituency: 113th district
- In office 1947–1968
- Constituency: Lackawanna County

Personal details
- Born: Michael J. Needham; October 8, 1910 Scranton, Pennsylvania, U.S.
- Died: February 1, 1986 (aged 75) Lackawanna County, Pennsylvania, U.S.
- Party: Democratic

Michael J. Needham (October 8, 1910 – February 1, 1986) was a Democratic member of the Pennsylvania House of Representatives.
