= Banco Nacional de Bolivia =

Bolivian banking institution

Banco Nacional de Bolivia S.A.

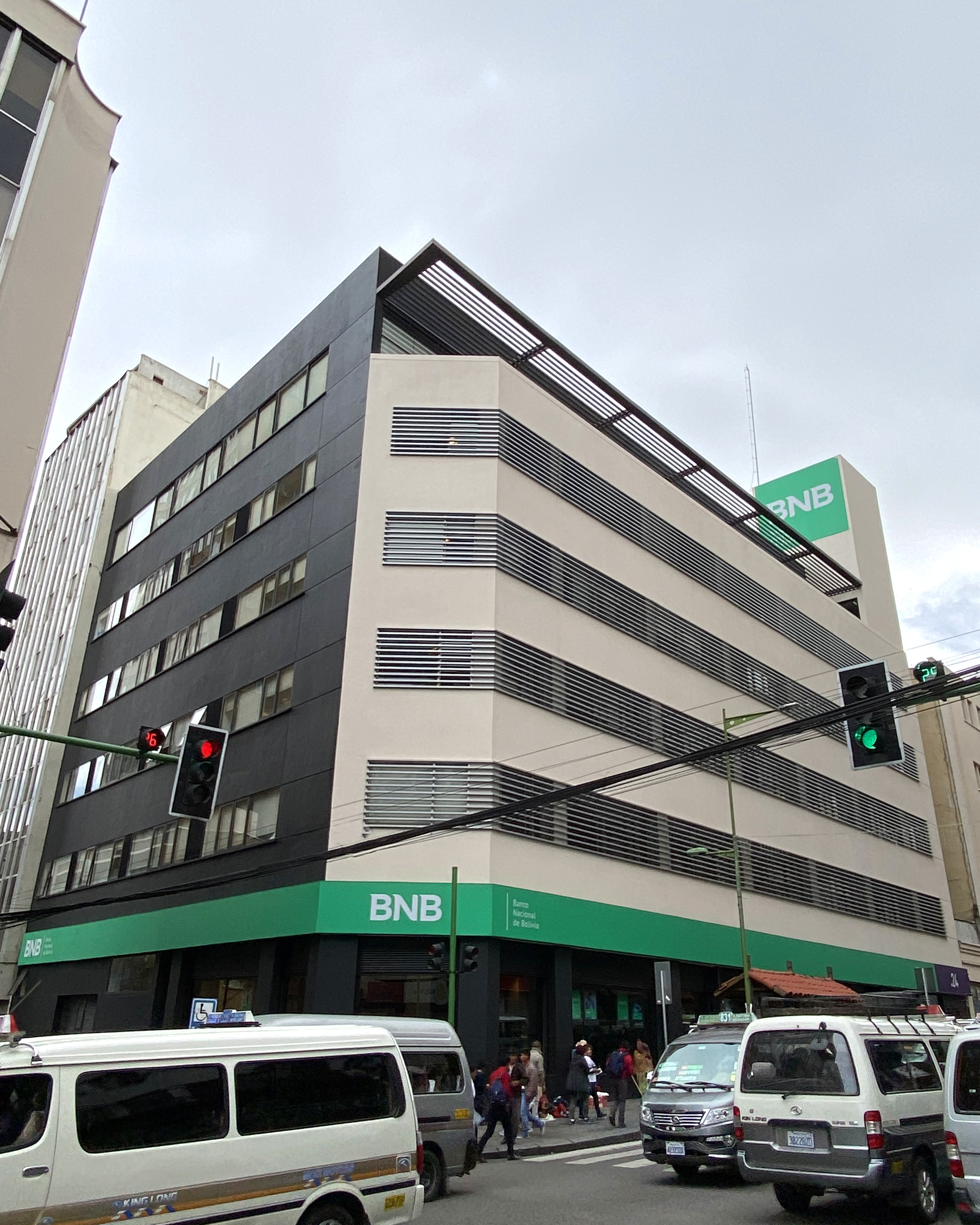
- Main headquarters in La Paz.
- Trade name: Banco Nacional de Bolivia S.A.
- Company type: Sociedad Anónima
- Traded as: BBV: BNB; Grey Market: BNBVY
- Industry: Banking, Financial services
- Founded: March 4, 1872; 154 years ago
- Headquarters: Sucre, Bolivia
- Key people: Pablo Bedoya Sáenz (President)
- Products: Consumer banking, corporate banking, credit cards, investment banking, mortgage loans.
- Revenue: ▲ Bs. 943 million (2014)
- Operating income: ▲ Bs. 336 million (2014)
- Net income: ▲ Bs. 228 million (2014)
- Total assets: ▲ Bs. 18.71 billion (2014)
- Number of employees: 2,033 (2014)
- Divisions: BNB SAFI S.A. BNB Valores S.A. BNB Leasing S.A. BNB Valores Perú S.A. SAB

Banco Nacional de Bolivia S.A. (BNB) (English: National Bank of Bolivia) is a Bolivian bank and financial institution headquartered in Sucre, Bolivia. Founded in 1871, it is one of Bolivia's oldest banks. It is also the country's second largest bank by total assets.

BNB is a full-service financial institution that provides a range of financial products and services to a diversified individual and corporate customer base in all the nine departments of Bolivia, including savings accounts, credit cards, mortgages, commercial loans and investment management. The bank operated through 59 agencies and over 380 ATM's.

The bank is part of BNB Corporacion S.A., a group which comprises also BNB Sociedad Administradora de Fondos de Inversión S.A. (SAFI) (BNB Administrative Society of Investment Funds), active in the investment and administration of funds, BNB Valores (BNB Stocks), a brokerage house, BNB Leasing, a leasing entity, and BNB Valores Perú S.A., Peruvian brokerage company. The latter makes BNB the only Bolivian-based bank with foreign operations.

== History ==
=== 19th century ===
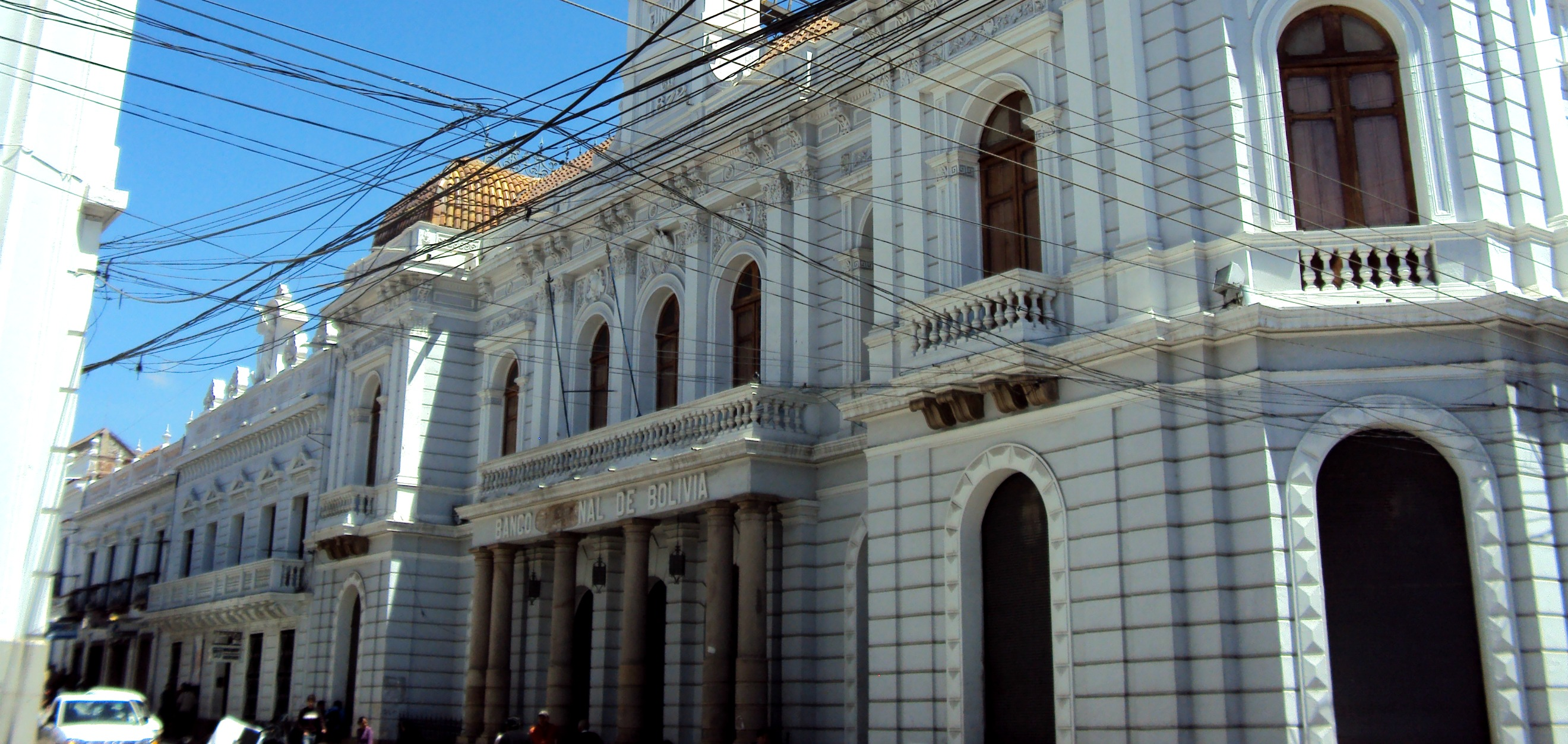
Historic building of BNB in Sucre.

Banco Nacional de Bolivia was conceived on 1 September 1871 by decree as a financial institution granted to issue banknotes, as well as to offer financial services such as deposits and loans. The bank was established in Cobija, an important port city located in the Litoral Department, Bolivia's only territory with access to the Pacific coast. An additional head office was established in the Chilean city of Valparaíso, and thus BNB had dual legal addresses at the time.

Since its founding, Banco Nacional de Bolivia provided inputs to national development at different stages of its history. The bank began providing financial assistance for the exploitation of nitrates in the Litoral region, particularly guano, used for fertilizer and to make saltpeter for the manufacture gunpowder. The Bolivian Littoral was subsequently annexed by Chile after the War of the Pacific. During the war, the bank loaned Bs. 600,000 to the Government of Bolivia in an effort to maximize the mobilization of the Bolivian Army in the war. Following the loss of the Bolivian Litoral, the bank moved its headquarters to the city of Sucre, where it held its first board of directors meeting. In the following years, the bank expanded its network to the cities of Tarija, La Paz, Cochabamba, Oruro, Potosí and Santa Cruz de la Sierra.

=== 20th century ===
Banco Nacional de Bolivia issued its own banknotes at a rate of 150% of its capital since its founding. On January 14, 1914, the Central Bank of Bolivia was established by the government, becoming the country's only monetary authority. Despite a central bank was established, Banco Nacional de Bolivia continued to offer significant financial assistance to the government. In 1903, BNB loaned Bs. 150,000 to the state in order to finance the Bolivian campaign of the Treaty of Petrópolis and in 1932, the bank granted US$210,000 of its foreign reserves to support the efforts of the Chaco War. In the following decade, BNB expanded its network of branches to all nine departments of Bolivia.

The political instability that continued for the rest of the century presented many challenges to the fledgling Bolivian banking system. After the 1952 Bolivian Revolution, the private sector finally overcame difficulties and challenges imposed by the central regimes and political groups in power. During this period, Banco Nacional de Bolivia, experienced considerable growth and in 1959 it granted a credit loan to the Corporación Boliviana de Desarrollo (Bolivian Development Corporation).

In 1993, Banco Nacional de Bolivia created its first division: "Nacional de Valores S.A.". It is the bank's first brokerage division. Later in 2005, it was rebranded to BNB Valores S.A. (BNB Stocks).

In 1997, Banco Nacional de Bolivia created its second division: "Nacional SAFI S.A.". The division provides investment management services. Later in 2000, it was rebranded to BNB Sociedad Administradora de Fondos de Inversión S.A. (SAFI) (BNB Administrative Society of Investment Funds).

=== 21st century ===
Banco Nacional de Bolivia became one of Bolivia's largest banks. Currently, it is the second-largest bank in Bolivia by assets. BNB is a full-service financial institution that provides a wide range of financial products and services to a diversified individual and corporate customer base in all the nine departments of Bolivia, including savings accounts, credit cards, mortgages, commercial loans and investment management. The bank operates a network of 105 branches and 253 ATM's nationwide.

In 2009, Banco Nacional de Bolivia created its third division: BNB Leasing, a leasing entity offering financial services such as mortgages, machinery and construction equipment leasing and car leasing.

It's also the only Bolivian bank that has a subsidiary outside of Bolivia, specifically in Perú.

== Operations ==
=== People Banking ===
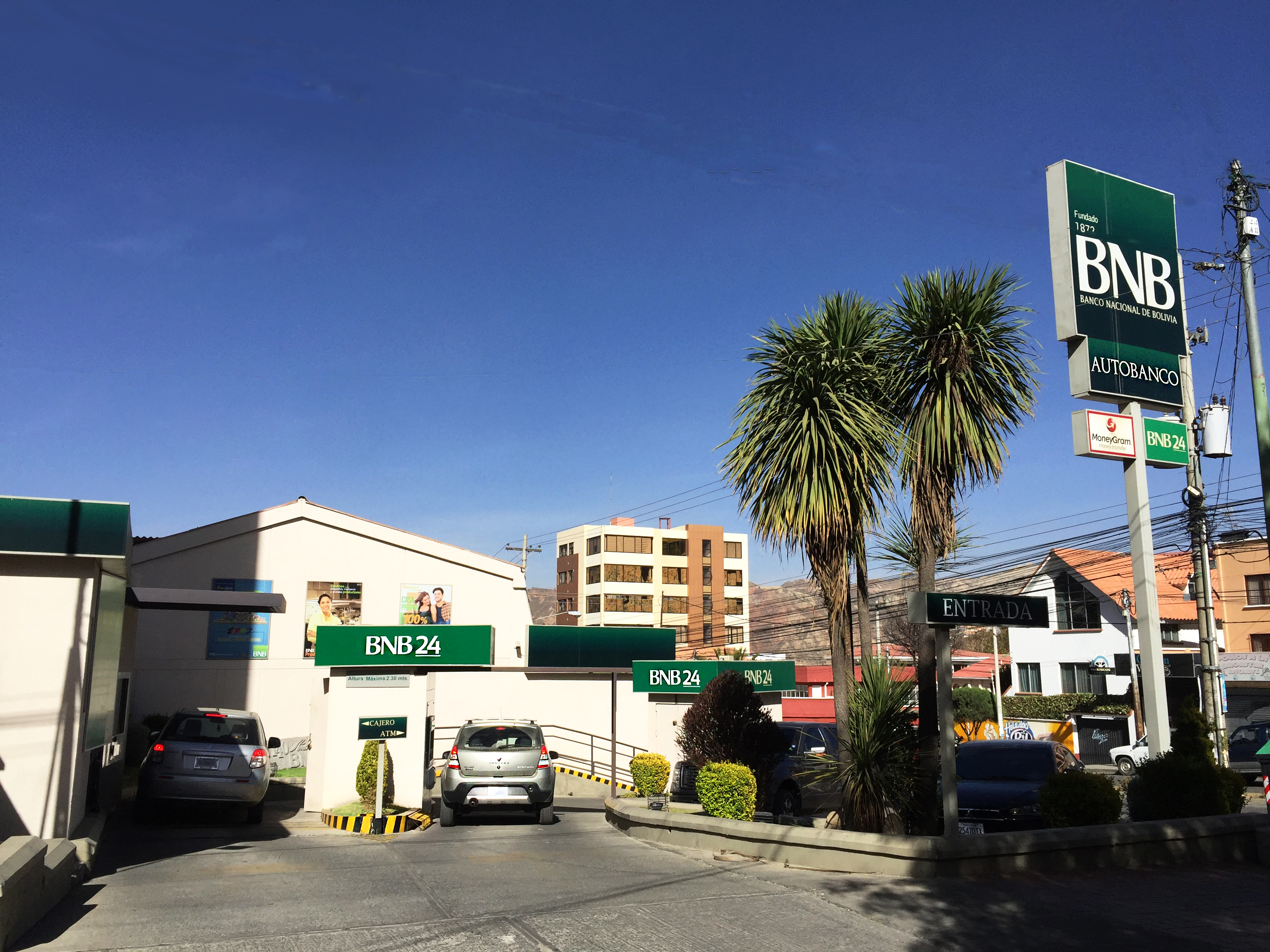
Drive-through branch of BNB in La Paz

Consumer Banking is the largest division in the company, and provides a wide range of financial services to consumers and small businesses. The consumer banking network of BNB includes over 100 branches and over 250 ATM's throughout Bolivia:

- Certificates of deposit/Term deposits: Developed and marketed as DPF Rentable, it is a CD in Bolivianos with interest rates of 4.5%, as weighted to pay for a five-year period.
- Mobile Banking: BNB launched its mobile app Banca Móvil del BNB for iOS, Android and Huawei operating systems. It allows BNB customers to conduct a number of financial transactions through their mobile devices as well as to see balance inquiries and statements.
- Credit cards: BNB issues Visa and MasterCard credit cards for purchases and online purchases.
- Credits: vehicular, housing, consumer and educational.
- Saving accounts and Debit Cards: The banks has three segments: Young Banking, Active Banking and Senior Banking. As customers, they have benefits and discounts.
- Mortgage loans

=== Business Banking ===
Banco Nacional de Bolivia offers a wide range of corporate banking services including:

- Mype Banking: Financial consulting and financing service for working capital or capital goods for micro and small companies.
- Pyme Banking: Financing service for working capital or capital goods for medium and small companies
- Corporate: Includes Checking Account, Safety Box, DPF's, External Guarantee, Guarantee Fund, Ach Transfers, Account Advance and Payment of Services.

=== Grupo ===
- BNB Safi: BNB Safi is an Investment Fund Management Company, offering funds in Bolivians and dollars. Manage the resources of each Investment Fund, investing them in different alternatives, in order to generate attractive returns for the participants.
- BNB Leasing: Financial leasing is a form of leasing whereby a leasing entity such as BNB Leasing. grants the use, enjoyment and temporary benefit of a certain property to a lessee.
- BNB Valores: BNB Stock Exchange Agency specialized in stock market operations.
