= Drive-through =

Service that motorists can use from their vehicle (without parking)

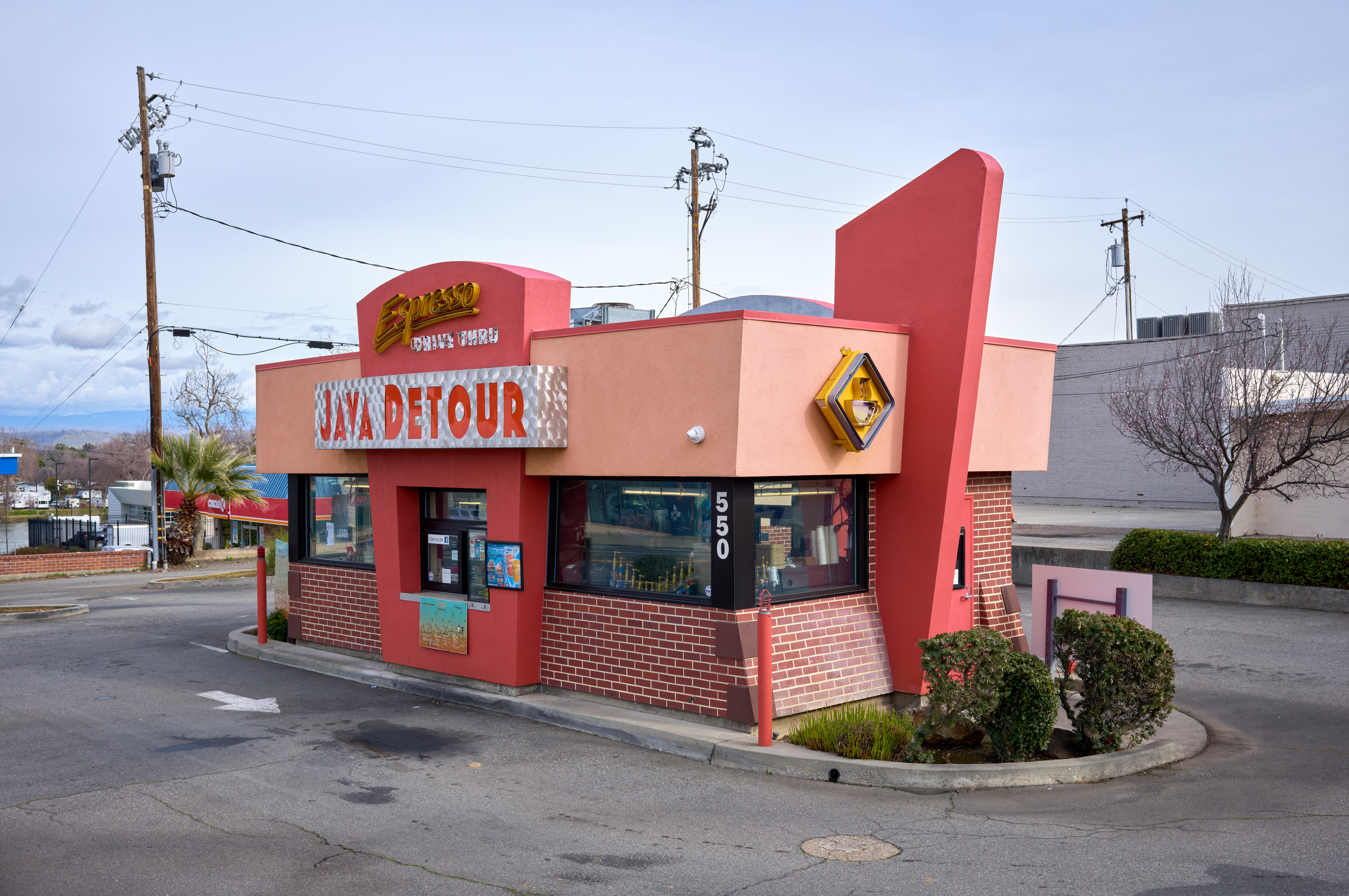
Drive-through of a coffeehouse-chain in Red Bluff, California

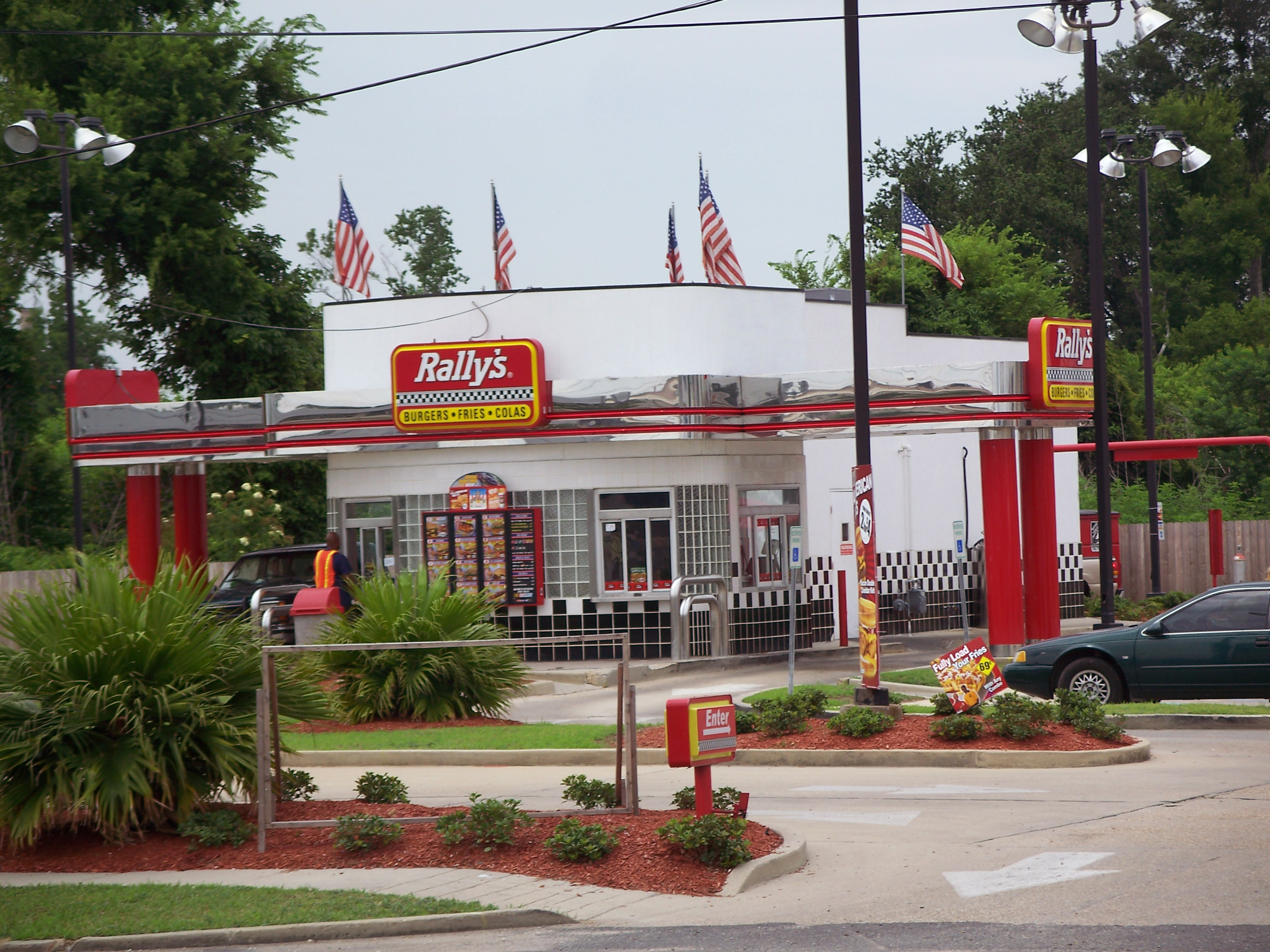
Some fast food chains, such as this Rally's located near New Orleans, Louisiana, have two drive-throughs.

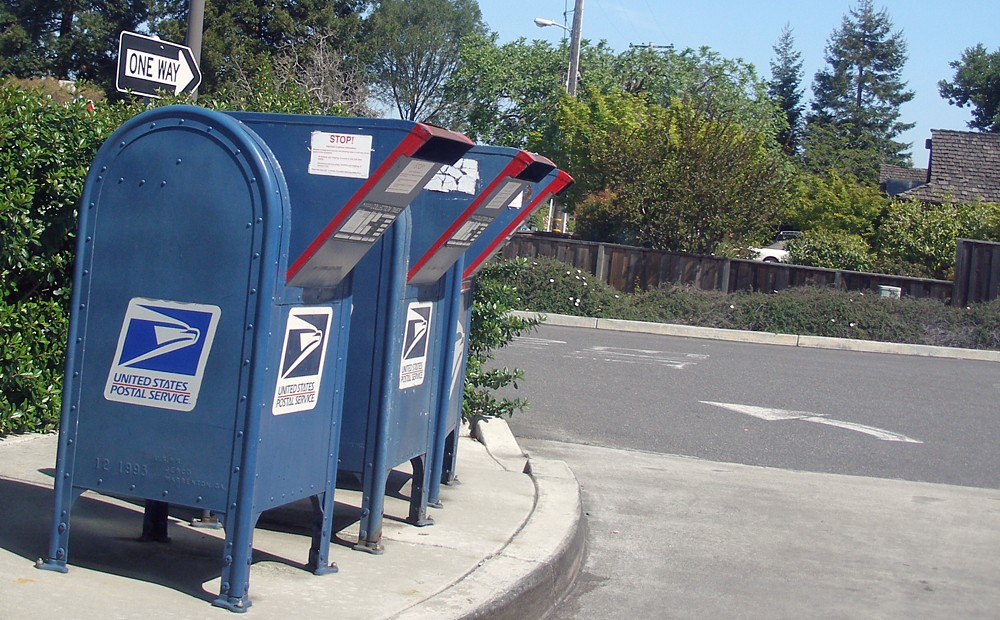
Drive-through mailboxes in Los Altos, California, United States

A drive-through or drive-thru (a sensational spelling of the word through) is a type of take-out service provided by a business that allows customers to purchase products (or use the service provided by the business) without leaving their cars. The format was pioneered in the United States in the 1930s and has since spread to other countries.

Drive-through facilities typically come in one of three forms. Single lane, where the agent is in the kiosk on the driver's side; dual lane, with the left lane on the left side of the kiosk facing the right side of the vehicle, and the right lane on the right side of the kiosk, facing the left side of the vehicle, with either an agent for each lane or a single agent handling both lanes; and multilane, with two or more lanes all with an agent on the driver's side of the vehicle. In some cases, a single lane kiosk may be approached in either direction at the driver's choice as to whether the driver or the passenger interacts with the agent.

A drive-up window teller was installed at the Grand National Bank of St. Louis, Missouri, in 1930. The drive-up teller allowed only deposits at that time.

Orders are generally placed using a microphone and picked up in person at the window. A drive-through is different from a drive-in restaurant in several ways. In a drive-through, the cars create a line and move in one direction, and normally do not park, whereas drive-ins allow cars to park next to each other, the food is generally brought to the window by a server- called a carhop- and the customer can remain in the parked car to eat. However, during peak periods, to keep the queue down and avoid traffic flow problems, drive-throughs occasionally switch to an "order at the window, then park in a designated space" model where the customer will receive their food from an attendant when it is ready to be served. This results in a perceived relationship between the two service models.

Drive-throughs have generally replaced drive-ins in popular culture, and are now found in the vast majority of modern American fast food chains. Sometimes, a store with a drive-through is referred to as a "drive-through", or the term is attached to the service, such as, "drive-through restaurant". or "drive-through bank".

Drive-throughs typically have signs over the drive-through lanes to show customers which lanes are open for business. The types of signage used is usually illuminated so the "open" message can be changed to a "closed" message when the lane is not available.

== Drive-through restaurants ==
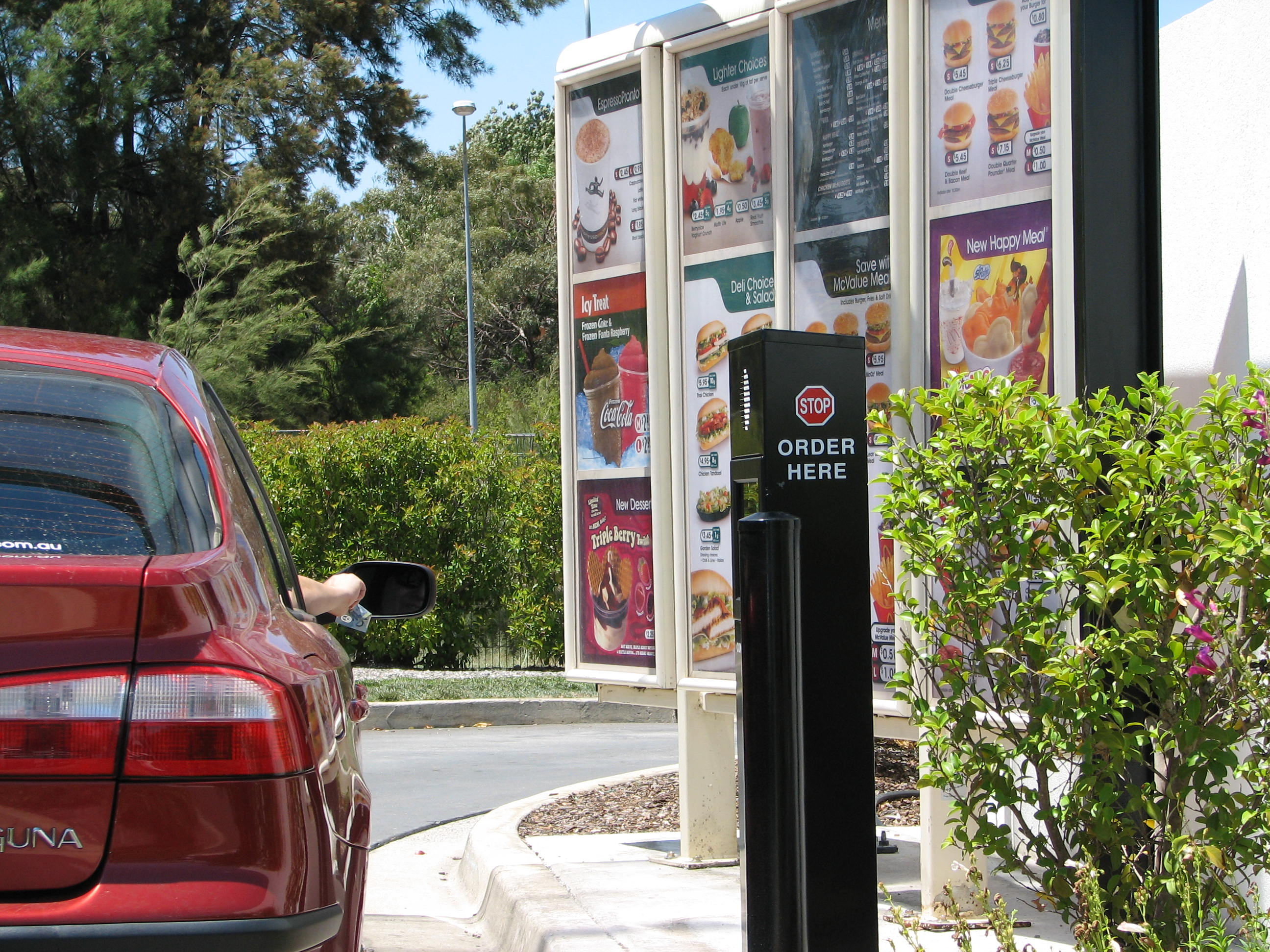
A typical Australian McDonald's drive-through with speaker

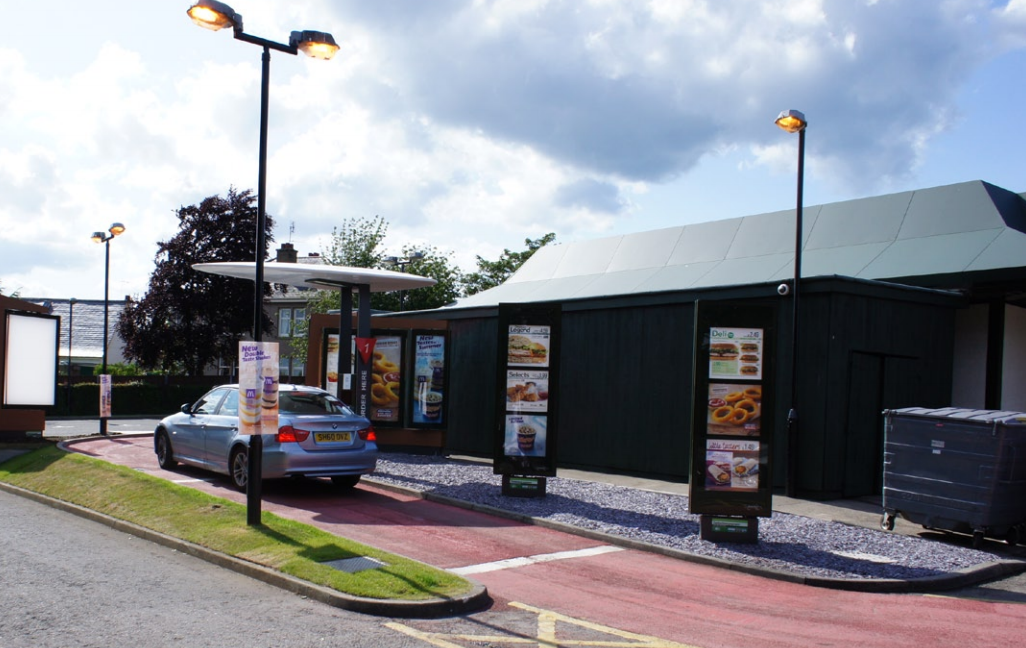
The intercom and menus at a British McDonald's restaurant in Edinburgh, Scotland

A drive-through restaurant generally consists of:

- A speaker and microphone for customers to place their orders
- A speaker and microphone or wireless headset system for employees to hear the customer's order (when a speaker is used)
- A trigger pad beneath the concrete to activate the microphone and headset
- Monitoring of the driveway and window through a CCTV system to monitor traffic flow and any criminal action that may occur at the window such as an armed robbery
- One or more free-standing signs listing the menu items, called a menu board
- Newer drive-throughs feature a LCD or LED display within the speaker system in order to show the full order and total cost to avert order errors through miscommunication; the entire menu board may also be a display, freeing employees of the responsibility of switching out promotions, adding or removing items, and making pricing changes. At many restaurants, a secondary display featuring the total is placed directly next to the order window to provide the amount to customers, usually paying with cash.
- Windows where employees interact with customers by processing the customer's payment and giving them their order. Most drive-throughs have either one window serving both functions or two windows, with the first being used for payment and the second used for retrieving the order, depending on overall restaurant traffic.
- Most restaurants have marked parking spaces just beyond the last window. If there is a significant delay in an individual customer's order (e.g. a special order) or congested line traffic, an employee may direct that customer to park in this area, clearing the drive-through lane for the next customer and preventing knock-on delays to other customers. When the order is ready, an employee hand-delivers the order to the customer. This service therefore occasionally has some similarities to drive-in service, but only during peak periods.

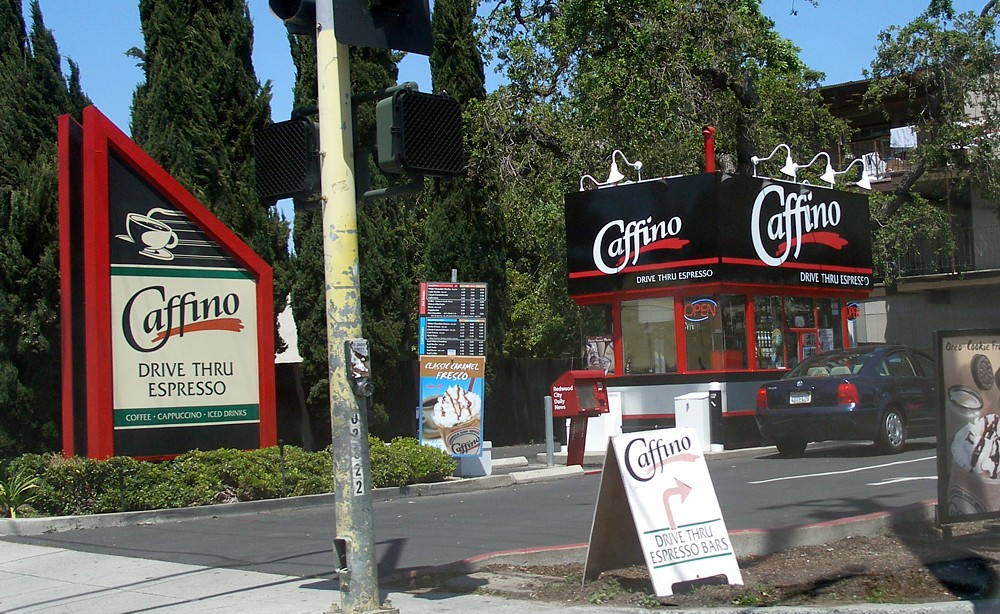
Some businesses are built only for drive-through service, like this espresso shop.

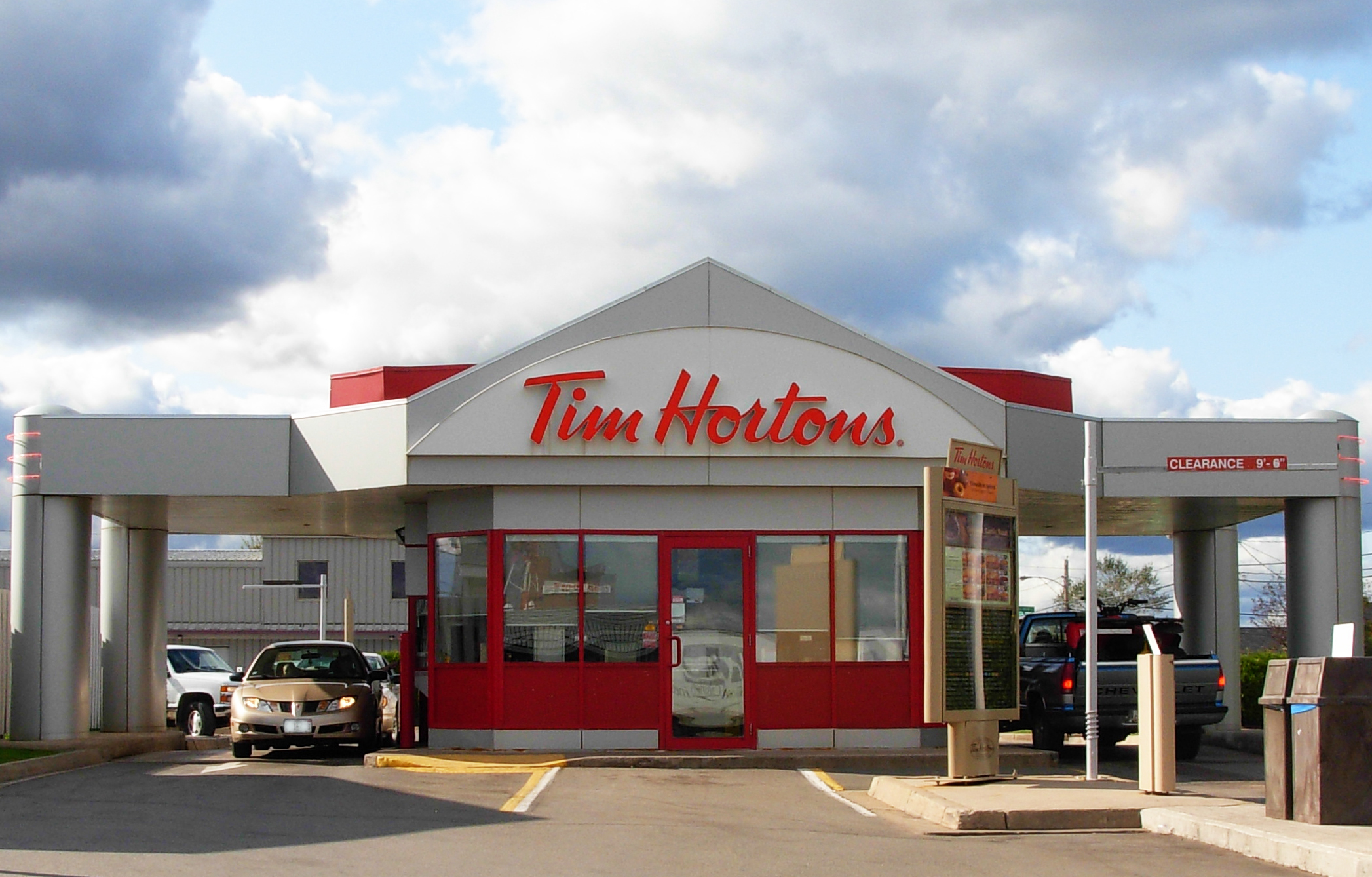
A drive-through only Tim Hortons location in Moncton, New Brunswick, Canada

Drive-through designs differ from restaurant to restaurant; however, most drive-throughs can accommodate a queue of four to six passenger cars or trucks simultaneously. Most drive-through lanes are designed so the service windows and speaker are on the driver's side of the car, for example, in left-hand traffic (right-hand drive) countries such as the UK, Ireland, Australia, India and New Zealand, the windows will be on the right side of the drive-through lane, and vice versa in right-hand traffic (left-hand drive) countries such as North America and mainland Europe. There are a few drive-through lanes designed with service windows on the passenger side, but these lanes are few and usually confined to ordinance compliance situations, as they cannot be used easily by driver-only vehicles.

Coffee is often sold through drive-through only coffee shops.

=== Service time ===
According to QSR's 2024 annual survey, Taco Bell was the fastest fast-food chain in the United States regarding drive-thru service time, with an average wait of 194.16 seconds. This was significantly faster than the overall average of 244.86 seconds. Other chains with relatively fast service times included KFC (206.41 seconds) and McDonald's (271.81 seconds). Chick-fil-A, known for its long lines, had an average service time of 298.27 seconds, but also had an additional wait time of 181.15 seconds, resulting in a total customer wait of approximately 479.42 seconds (8 minutes).

=== History ===
In 1921, Kirby's Pig Stand introduced the drive-in restaurant, in which carhops delivered meals. In 1931, a California Pig Stand franchise introduced a drive-through service that bypassed the carhops. The first identified drive-through restaurant was established in 1947 at Red's Giant Hamburg located in Springfield, Missouri. A year later in 1948, Harry and Esther Snyder of the In-N-Out Burger chain built a drive-through restaurant, featuring a two-way speaker system that Harry Snyder invented himself earlier that year. By the 1970s, drive-through service had surpassed drive-in restaurants in the United States.

The first McDonald's drive-through was created in 1975 in Sierra Vista, Arizona, near Fort Huachuca, a military installation, to serve military members who were not permitted to get out of their cars off-post while wearing fatigues. The original McDonald's was closed down and demolished in 1999 and a new McDonald's replaced it.

In 1987, Bob Charles pioneered the concept of the double vehicle drive-through. Charles, a McDonald's franchisee based in Boulder, Colorado, was the first to design and implement this innovation, which resulted in significantly increased per-unit volume.

In 1981, Max Hamburgers opened Northern Europe's first drive-in in Piteå.

Another early drive-through restaurant in Europe, a McDonald's drive-through, opened at the Nutgrove Shopping Centre in Dublin, Ireland, in 1985.

In the US, drive-throughs account for 70% of McDonald's business and the average drive-through order is fulfilled in under 3:30. Outside of the US, McDonald's drive-throughs are variously known as "McDrive" and "AutoMac".

In 2010, the Casa Linda, Texas, franchise of McDonald's opened a drive-through/walk-up-only store with no indoor seating although it has a small patio with tables.

== Drive-through banking ==
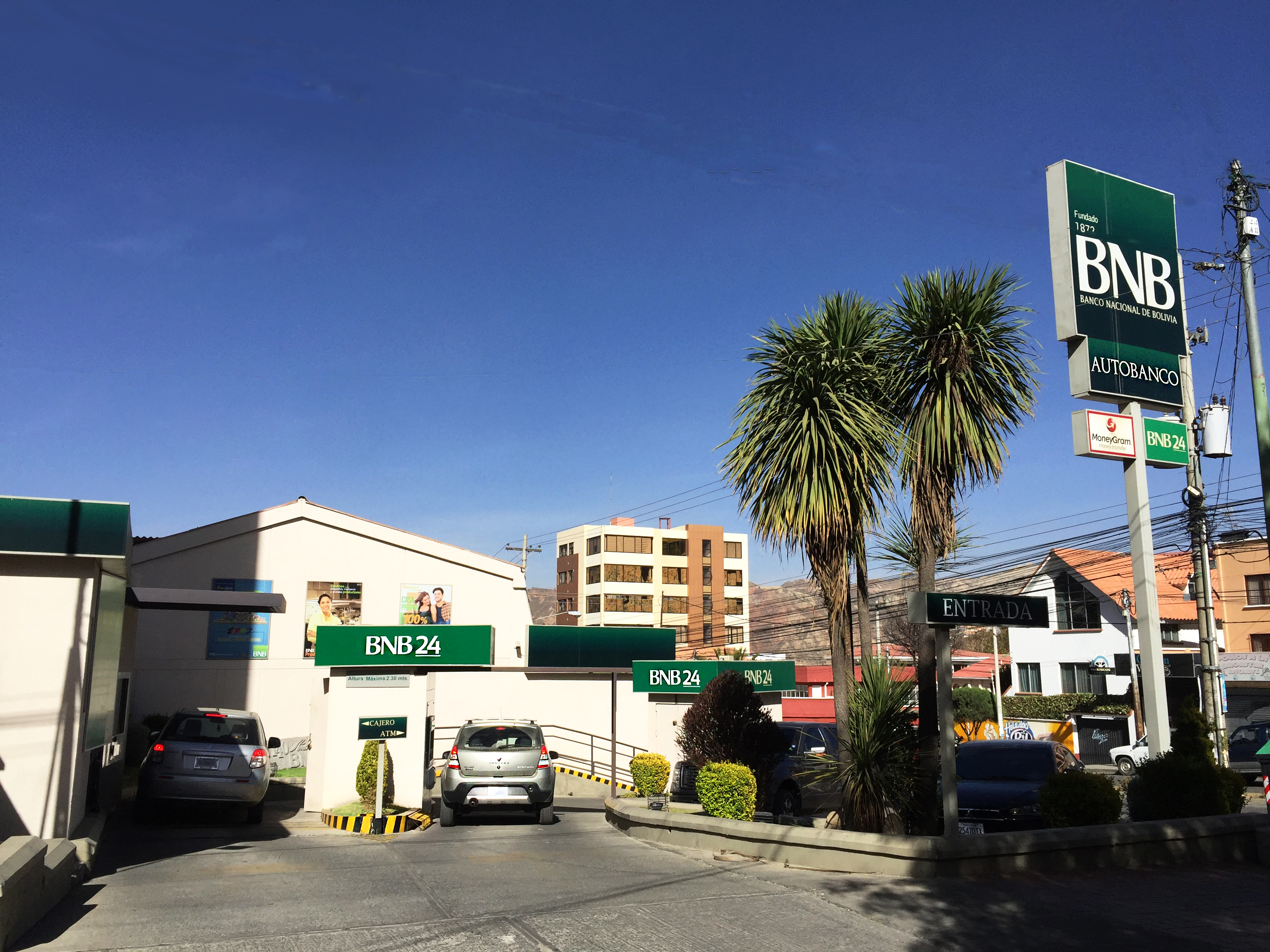
A drive-through for BNB in La Paz, Bolivia, an example of drive-through banking

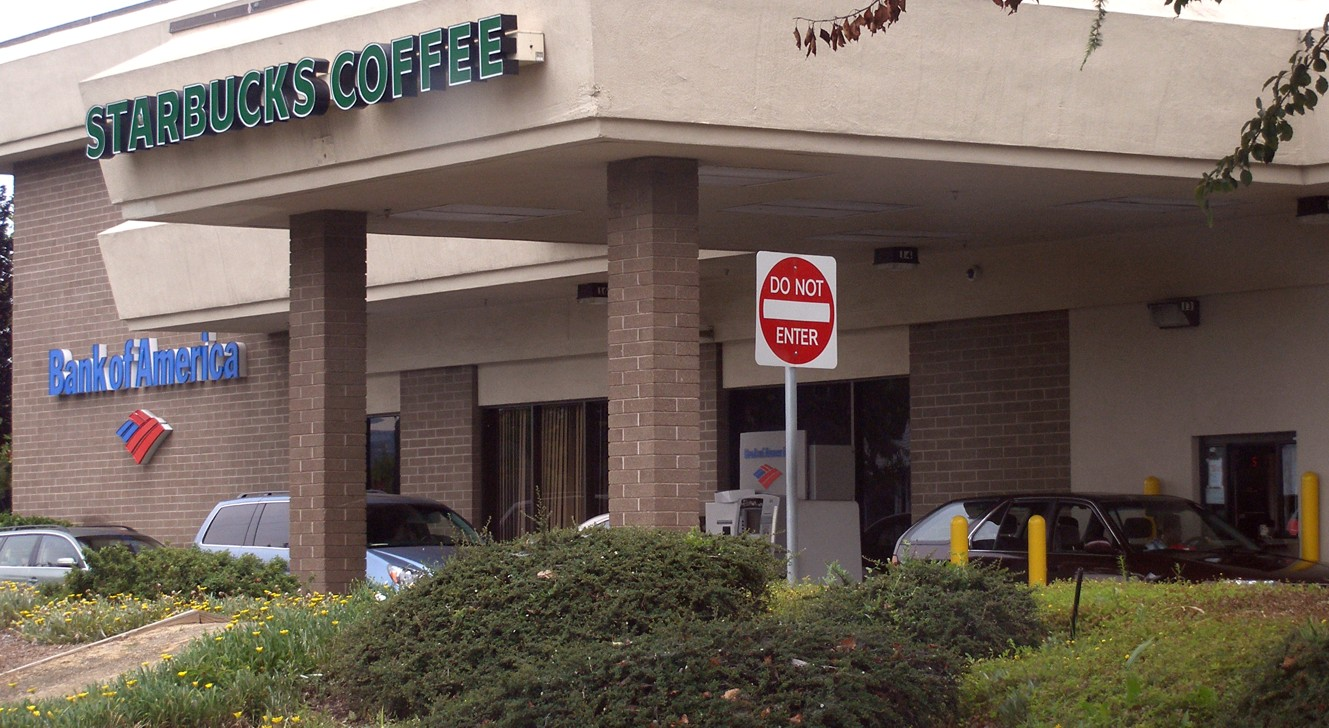
A drive-through shared by a bank and a coffee shop

In 1928, City Center Bank, which became UMB Financial Corporation, president R. Crosby Kemper opened what is considered the first drive-up window. Shortly after the Grand National Bank in St Louis opened up a drive-through, including a slot to the side for night time deposits. Westminster Bank opened the UK's first drive-through bank in Liverpool in 1959, soon followed by Ulster Bank opening Ireland's first in 1961 at Finaghy.

In recent years, there has been a decline in drive-through banking due to increased traffic congestion and the increased availability of automated teller machines and telephone and internet banking. Many bank buildings now feature drive-through ATMs.

== Drive-through stores ==
=== Grocery shopping ===
Harold Willis and his father, Robert Willis, first incorporated a dairy and eggs drive-through service in Redlands, California, in the early 1940s, supplying milk and eggs quickly and efficiently to driving customers; this utilized a dairy conveyor belt that Harold Willis had invented. Farm Stores began drive-through service in 1957 in Miami Florida, and soon added locations throughout the SouthEast. Crafty's Drive-Buy Grocery Store in Virginia started offering the service. In 2012, the Dutch chain Albert Heijn introduced a "Pick Up Point" where one can collect groceries bought online. In the UK, this service was first announced by Tesco in August 2010. Some supermarkets offer drive-through facilities for grocery shopping.

Dairy products were available at a drive-through dairy store (notably the Skinner Dairy shops of North-East Florida or Dairy Barn in Long Island).

=== Liquor stores ===
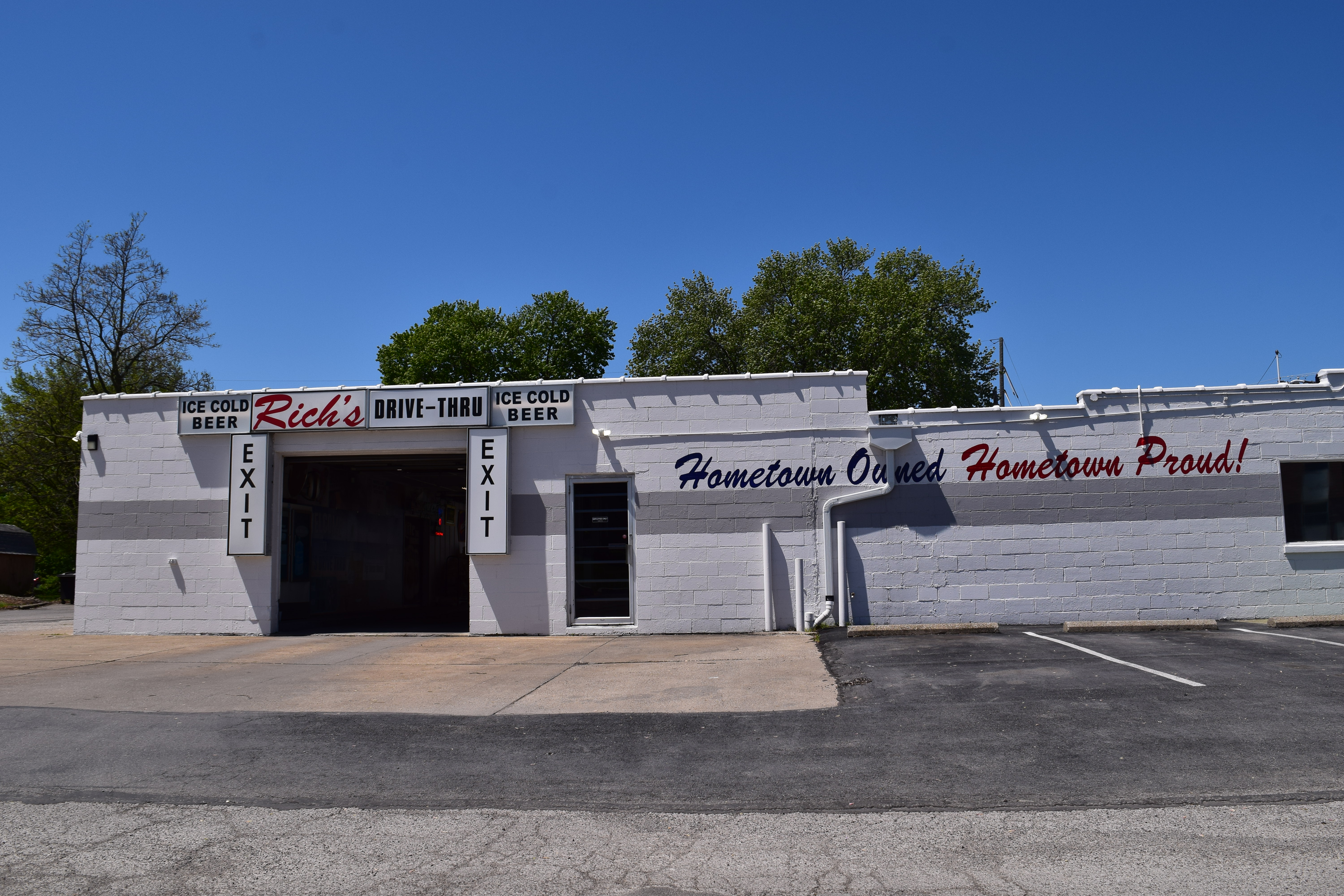
A drive-through beer store in Port Clinton, Ohio

Alcoholic beverages have been sold at a drive-through liquor store (called a "Beer Through", a "Cruise Through", a "Brew Thru" in the U.S. eastern Mid-Atlantic coast, or a "Pony Keg" or "Party Barn" in certain areas; generally illegal in Northeast and West U.S.). Drive-through liquor stores are a common feature of Australian suburban hotels, typically called "drive-thru bottle shops".

== Drive-through medical testing ==
During the COVID-19 pandemic, drive-through testing became a common approach around the world for testing people who were potentially infected with the virus. In 2020, drive-through testing facilities were set up in many countries to test whether passengers were infected with COVID-19 (the first being in South Korea).

This approached allowed medical workers to process high volumes of tests quickly while reducing exposure and risk of infection between those being tested by keeping patients isolated in their vehicles.

The process typically saw patients present their ID before being swabbed while remaining in their vehicles, before driving off once the test was complete. Their results were then typically shared with them either via text message or via their doctor.

== Emissions and traffic ==
=== Emissions ===
In recent years, drive-through restaurants and other drive-through facilities have faced increased scrutiny due to the higher levels of emissions that they create – compared to walk-in equivalents. A 2018 study by QSR Magazine found that the average waiting time at a McDonald's drive-through restaurant in the US took 3 minutes and 15 seconds, with an average of 3.8 cars waiting at any one time. This figure rose to an average of 4 minutes 25 seconds in 2019.

If the average motorist avoided idling for just 3 minutes every day of the year, CO_{2} emissions would be reduced by 1.4 million tonnes annually, or the equivalent of taking 320,000 cars off the road.

In response to emerging evidence of the role that drive-throughs play in contributing to climate change, Minneapolis banned the construction of new drive-throughs in 2019, while a number of other US cities, including Creve Coeur, MO; Fair Haven, NJ; Long Beach, CA; and Orchard Park, NY, have enacted ordinances to restrict or prohibit fast-food drive-through restaurants.

Outside the US, a total of 27 municipalities have banned drive-through restaurants on the grounds of environmental and health concerns from engine idling.

=== Traffic ===
Long drive-through lines in the United States have been reported to cause traffic backups, blocking emergency vehicles and city buses and increasing the risk of collisions and pedestrian injuries. The popularity of Chick-fil-A's drive-throughs in particular has led to traffic problems, police interventions, and complaints by neighboring businesses in more than 20 states.

== Other examples ==
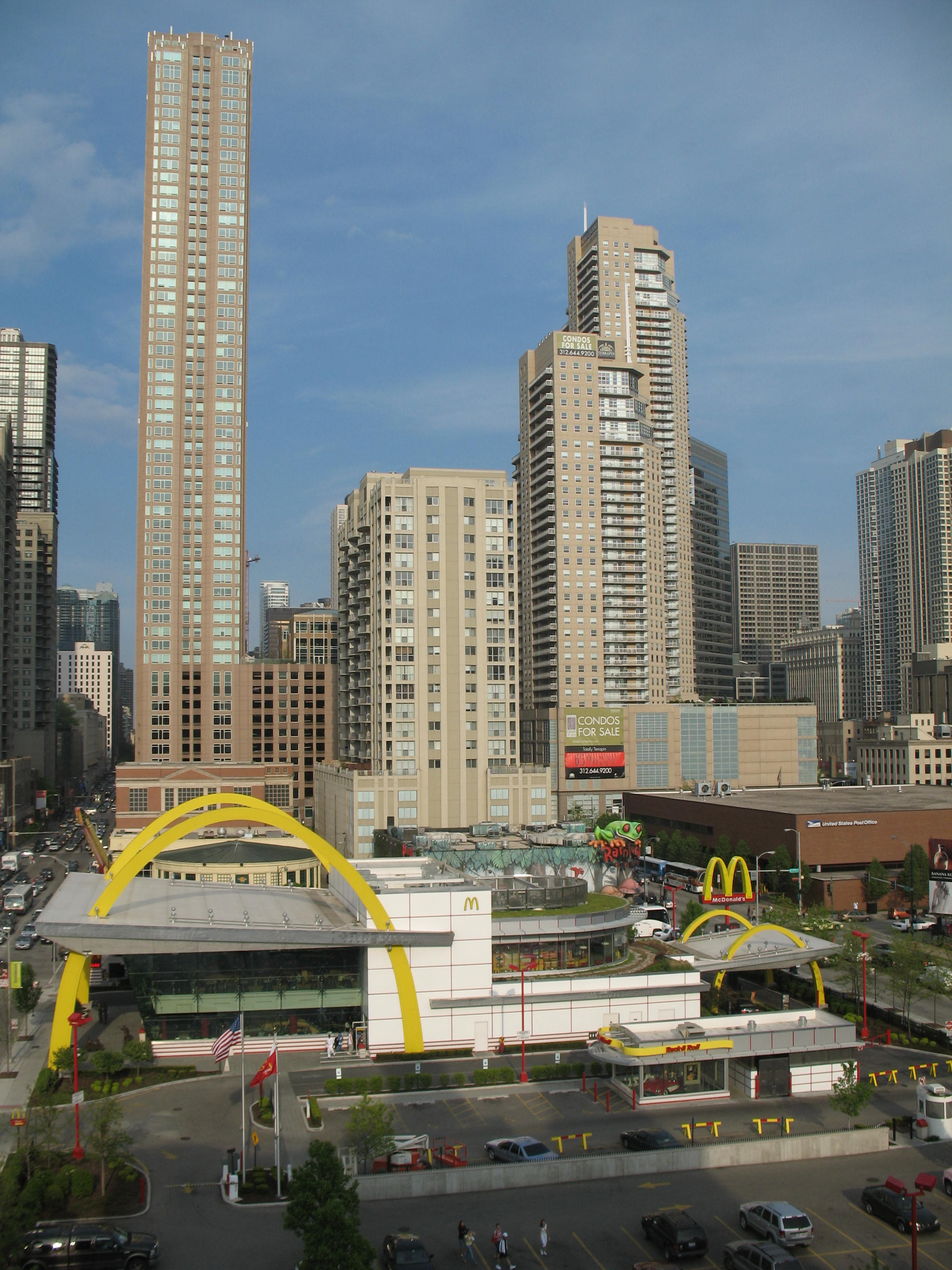
McDonald's first two-lane drive-through was at the Rock N Roll McDonald's in Chicago.

Some other examples of drive-through businesses include:

- Postal services at a drive-through mailbox
- Prescriptions at a drive-through pharmacy
- Marriage (primarily at special drive-through marriage chapels in Las Vegas in the United States)
- Funeral home where mourners can drive by, view and make offerings to the remains of their loved ones through windows.
- Pennsylvania State Representative Kevin P. Murphy installed a drive-through window designed to speed constituent service.
- Photo processing at Fotomat.
- Christmas lights displays

== Non-car customers ==
Pedestrians sometimes attempt to walk through the drive-through to order food. Many establishments refuse drive-through service to pedestrians for safety, insurance, and liability reasons. Cyclists are also usually refused service with the same justification given. However, in the summer of 2009, Burgerville gave use of the drive-through window to bicyclists.

=== Walk-up windows ===
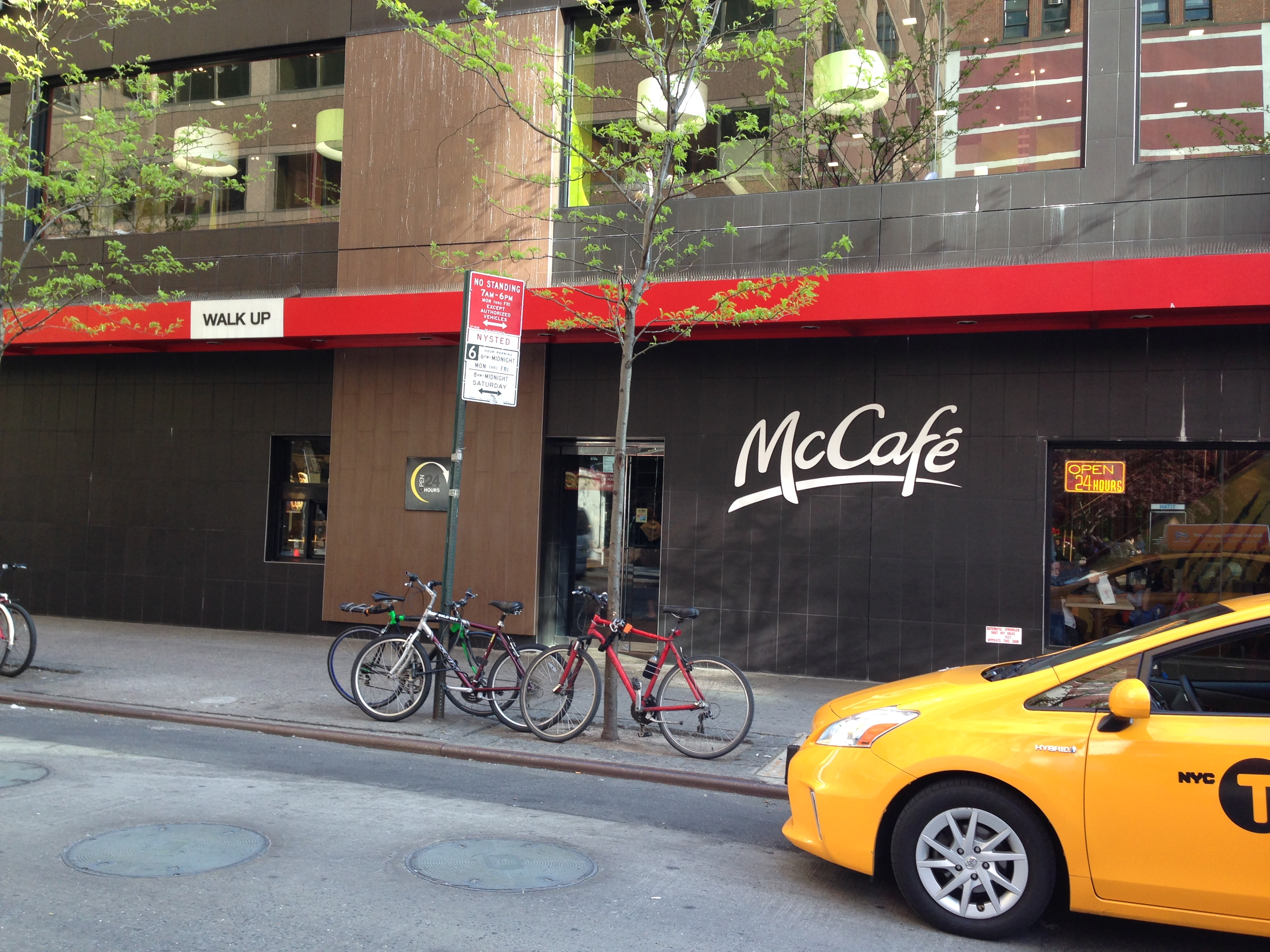
McDonald's walk-up window (left) at a location in New York City

Some companies provide a walk-up window instead when a drive-through may not be practical. However, the walk-up windows should not be confused with small establishments that customers are lined up for services such as mobile kitchens, kiosks, or concession stands. These walk-up windows are value-added services on top of the full services provided inside the stores. Since the COVID-19 pandemic an increasing number of restaurants, including bakeries and pizzerias, have introduced sliding windows that are licensed by the local municipality for customer transactions.

An example is when McDonald's entered a new market in Russia where the majority of families did not own cars, the owners developed the walk-up windows as an alternative. Some establishments may want to use walk-up windows to attract certain customer demographics such as younger customers who need quick service during late night. Another reason is to offer extended service hours and maintain a safe environment for employees, such as a bulletproof walk-up window in high-crime areas.

=== Horse ===
Similar issues can arise in rural areas for people on horseback or in a horse-drawn carriage. On 20 July 2013, a woman was fined for taking her horse inside a McDonald's restaurant in Greater Manchester, United Kingdom, after being refused service at the drive-through. The horse ended up defecating inside the restaurant which caused distress to other customers.

=== Visually impaired ===
In May 2016, Scott Magee filed a United States federal class action lawsuit pursuing action against McDonald's due to the company being unwilling to serve people who are visually impaired, when only the drive-through lane is open.

On 24 May 2018 a law came into effect in Portland, Oregon, requiring multi-modal access to drive-throughs. The new zoning law states, "When a drive-through facility is open and other pedestrian-oriented customer entrances to the business are unavailable or locked, the drive-through facility must serve customers using modes other than a vehicle such as pedestrians and bicyclists."

After one year, the Portland law was successful.

=== Ski-through ===
McDonald's first opened a ski-through called McSki in the ski resort of Lindvallen, Sweden, in 1996.

== See also ==
- B-Bop's
- Drive-in
- Disposable food packaging
- Effects of the car on societies
