= Business courts in the United States =

As in other jurisdictions, business courts in the United States are specialized courts for legal cases involving commercial law, internal business disputes, and other matters affecting businesses. They are generally trial courts that primarily or exclusively adjudicate internal business disputes and/or commercial litigation between businesses, heard before specialist judges assigned to these courts. Business courts may be further specialized, as in those that decide technology disputes and those that weigh appeals. Alternative dispute resolution and arbitration have connections to business courts.

== Background ==
Business courts and commercial courts are specialized courts for cases involving commercial law, internal business disputes, and other matters affecting businesses.

The courts of the United States are closely linked hierarchical systems of courts at the federal and state levels. The federal courts form the judicial branch of the U.S. government and operate under the authority of the United States Constitution and federal law. The state and territorial courts of the individual U.S. states and territories operate under the authority of the state and territorial constitutions and state and territorial law.

== Business and commercial courts ==
Business courts in the United States are trial courts that primarily or exclusively adjudicate internal business disputes and/or commercial litigation between businesses, heard before specialist judges assigned to these courts. They have been established in approximately twenty-seven states. In some cases, a state legislature may choose to create a business court by statute. In other cases, business courts have been established by judicial rule or order, at the state supreme court or trial court level. Georgia created a statewide business court by constitutional amendment.

=== Types of jurisdictional models ===
In virtually all cases, the jurisdiction of the court to hear certain cases is limited to disputes that are in some way related to "business" or commercial disputes, and generally fall into two categories: (1) those courts which require that cases have an additional complexity component; and (2) those courts which establish jurisdictional parameters (i) through a defined list of case types (ii) combined with a specified minimum amount of damages in controversy, irrespective of complexity.

In New York, for example, the trial level Supreme Court Commercial Division follows the case type and jurisdictional amount in controversy model, giving jurisdiction over 12 listed business and commercial case categories while setting out monetary thresholds ranging from $50,000 in some counties to $500,000 in Manhattan. The Massachusetts Superior Court's Business Litigation Session (BLS) includes a jurisdictional list of case types, but instead of focusing on monetary thresholds as a gatekeeping mechanism, cases are included only where "the BLS in the sound discretion of the BLS Administrative Justice, based principally on the complexity of the case and the need for substantial case management," selects a case for inclusion.

There are mixed models as well, with some mandatory case type categories specifically listed, and other discretionary types requiring an element of complexity. The Maryland Circuit Court's Business and Technology Case Management Program includes certain "presumptive" mandatory case types, while others categories require a judge to more subjectively determine if they are complex enough to include on the docket. North Carolina's Business Court has a similar mixed model that makes jurisdiction mandatory if the listed commercial case type is over $5,000,000, but discretionary if under, as well as a seldom used rule allowing judicial discretion.

=== History of business and commercial court creation and development ===
The modern creation of specialized Business Courts in the United States began in the early 1990s, and has expanded greatly in the last thirty years. Business courts (which are often business programs or divisions within existing trial level courts) are operating (as of October 2024) in New York County/Manhattan, and 10 other jurisdictions throughout New York State as the New York Supreme Court Commercial Division, Chicago, North Carolina, New Jersey, Philadelphia and Pittsburgh, Pennsylvania, Reno and Las Vegas, Nevada, Massachusetts, Rhode Island, Maryland, Orlando, Miami, Ft. Lauderdale, and Tampa, Florida, Michigan, Cincinnati, Cleveland and Toledo, Ohio, Iowa, Maine, New Hampshire, Metro Atlanta regionally and statewide via the Georgia State-wide Business Court, Delaware's Superior Court and Court of Chancery, Nashville, Tennessee, Indiana, Phoenix, Arizona, Kentucky, South Carolina, West Virginia, and Wyoming, as well as Utah and Texas.

In 2023, Utah adopted legislation creating a statewide Business and Chancery Court, which became operational on October 1, 2024. In 2023, Texas' governor signed legislation creating a trial level Business Court, and an appellate business court (that also hears disputes over the constitutionality of state statutes), the Fifteenth Court of Appeals. These courts have been open for cases since September 1, 2024. In August 2024, the Texas Supreme Court rejected a constitutional challenge to the appellate business court's creation.

While Wisconsin still has the remnant of a business court as of October 2024, by a 4–3 vote its Supreme Court issued an order on October 7, 2024, ending the assignment of new cases to the commercial court pilot project, first established by that court in April 2017.

Delaware's Court of Chancery, the pre-eminent court addressing intra-business disputes, has functioned as a business court of limited jurisdiction for over a century. However, its traditional equity jurisdiction has evolved and expanded since 2003 to include technology disputes, some purely monetary commercial disputes, and to expand its role in the alternative dispute resolution of business and commercial disputes. This includes the use of mediation, Masters in Chancery to adjudicate matters, and agreements to make decisions non-appealable.

Other states have a mixed history. In New York, Chicago, Philadelphia, Massachusetts, North Carolina, South Carolina, and New Jersey, among other locations with business courts, the original programs have expanded by adding judges and/or by expanding into additional cities and counties. Around 2000, Colorado's Supreme Court studied a business court, but did not pursue it, and the Denver District Court later experimented for three years with a business court, known as the Civil Access Pilot Project. Orlando's business court was restored in October 2019, after an earlier funding shortage.

In 2015, New Jersey's Supreme Court created a statewide Complex Business Litigation Program after having only a few counties with business courts before that. In 2009, Milwaukee's Circuit Court ended a little used business court program, but Wisconsin's Supreme Court implemented a business court pilot program in 2017 which has expanded to a number of circuit courts and judicial districts, which project has now been ended as of October 2024. In May 2024, Oklahoma enacted a law creating a task force to study business courts, but in October 2025 Oklahoma's Supreme Court found the new law unconstitutional. The Hamilton County, Ohio Court of Common Pleas in Cincinnati discontinued its Commercial Docket in 2017, but revived it in 2024. In December 2024, a bill was submitted in Montana's Senate to create a specialized court combining business, constitutional, and land disputes within its jurisdiction, which was withdrawn in February 2025.

=== U.S. complex civil litigation dockets and complex business/commercial cases ===
There is a distinct type of specialized civil litigation docket designed to handle complex litigation, often referred to as complex civil litigation programs or complex civil litigation courts.

At least California, Connecticut, Oregon, and Minnesota courts have created specialized dockets for complex civil litigation within their civil trial courts. These programs define jurisdiction through the complexity of how a case presents itself procedurally and the processes that will be used to manage a case, rather than by expressly limiting jurisdiction to cases with a specific legal subject matter, as business courts do. California's complex civil litigation program provides an example of defining jurisdiction based on litigation process criteria, such as the presence of large numbers of witnesses, parties, and pre-trial motions, and the need for coordination with other cases (though some categories of case types are deemed provisionally complex). California's complex litigation programs are not statewide, but include at least the following county Superior Courts: Alameda, Contra Costa, Los Angeles, Orange, Riverside, Sacramento, San Francisco, San Mateo, and Santa Clara.

Some complex litigation programs do not have any case type overlap with the kind of cases heard in business courts, such as Philadelphia's Complex Litigation Center which only handles mass tort cases. Other complex civil programs expressly include some business and commercial case types within their jurisdiction, along with more numerous non-business court complex case types, such as Connecticut (which includes complex cases involving "formation, governance, dissolution or transfer of control of business entities," the Uniform commercial code, complex contracts, intellectual property, and business torts), Minnesota (ownership or control of businesses cases), and Lane County, Oregon's Commercial Court that expressly includes within its jurisdiction both commercial and non-commercial complex cases. The San Francisco Superior court complex civil litigation program helps deal with business litigation in that court.

Former Orange County Complex Litigation Program judge Gail A. Andler is a past president of the American College of Business Court Judges (ACBCJ), and a number of California's complex litigation judges (including judge Elihu Berle), and Minnesota complex litigation judge Jerome B. Abrams, have served as Business Court Representatives to the American Bar Association's Section of Business Law. Abrams is a 2023-2024 vice president of the ACBCJ. Berle is also a current officer of the ACBCJ (as of May 2024), has spoken at its judicial education programs, and participated in its first meeting in 2005.

== Technology disputes & cyber courts ==
In the United States, "[t]he notion of specialized courts to decide technology disputes has a . . . history with noteworthy milestones."

Some states have established specialized business and commercial courts that include technology disputes as part of their express jurisdiction. Through legislative effort and court rule, in 2003, Maryland established a Business and Technology Case Management Program. In May 2003, Delaware expanded the Court of Chancery's jurisdiction to include technology disputes. West Virginia's Business Court Division Rules includes technology issues. The Tennessee's Business Court Docket encompasses technology and biotechnology licensing. North Carolina's Business Court jurisdiction includes computer software, information technology and systems, data and data system security, biotechnology and bioscience technology.

Michigan's business court jurisdiction includes disputes "involving information technology, software, or website development, maintenance, or hosting...." Wyoming Chancery Court Rules provide jurisdiction over disputes concerning registered digital assets. New York's Commercial Division Rule were amended in 2024 to expressly include "technology transactions and/or commercial disputes involving or arising out of technology". This amendment is intended to make clear that New York is as experienced in handling technology as any other state's courts.

Some jurisdictions emphasized the idea that newly created business courts would make use of cutting-edge technologies in handling business litigation, becoming so-called cyber courts. For example, North Carolina's Business Court was an early proponent of electronic filing and high-tech courtrooms. New York's Commercial Division created "Courtroom 2000" making various technologies available for use by the courts and parties, while also serving as "a technological laboratory" for later use in all of New York's state courts. The use of technology in case management may be especially apt in international commercial courts, with litigation between parties from different nations. For example, the ADGM Courts in Abu Dhabi self-describe as "the world's first end-to-end, fully digital courts platform...."

== Entities and committees involved in developing and maintaining business courts ==
The history of business and commercial courts in the United States provides considerable examples of task forces, advisory bodies, bar associations and other entities involved in their creation, development and refinement, and in providing education on their operations.

=== Entities created by or with courts, legislature or executive branch of government ===
A number of business courts were created after studies carried out by task forces preceding a business court's creation. For example, North Carolina's Governor established the North Carolina Commission on Business Laws and the Economy, New York Chief Judge Judith S. Kaye created a Commercial Courts Task Force, a Nevada Legislative Commission formed a Subcommittee to Encourage Corporations and Other Business Entities to Organize and Conduct Business in this State, Maryland's General Assembly created a Business and Technology Court Task Force, and the South Carolina Bar, with South Carolina Supreme Court approval, created a Task Force on Courts. Other examples of states creating task forces to study and make recommendations concerning the implementation of business courts include, among others, Indiana, Michigan, West Virginia, Arizona, Georgia, Iowa, New Jersey, Ohio, Delaware, Mississippi (no court created), Texas, and Oklahoma (May 2024).

Other groups have studied and reported on operations and practices in functioning business and commercial courts, to provide information and/or recommendations. Massachusetts, Superior Court Chief Justice Suzanne V. DelVecchio created a Business Litigation Resource Committee. Arizona's Supreme Court created the Commercial Court Review Committee. Iowa's State Court Administration has made annual reviews of the Iowa Business Specialty Court . Tennessee's Supreme Court created a Business Court Docket Advisory Commission. The North Carolina Administrative Office of the Courts submits annual reports on the North Carolina Business Court. West Virginia's Business Court Division makes annual reports. Wisconsin's Supreme Court created the Business Courts Advisory Committee. In 2023, Utah's Supreme Court created an Advisory Committee on the Rules of Business and Chancery Procedure.

Some councils and committees take an active role in business courts' ongoing operations. In 2013, New York Court of Appeals Chief Judge Jonathan Lippman established the New York Commercial Division Advisory Council (CDAC) to implement an earlier task force's recommendations. The CDAC "is composed of distinguished commercial practitioners and Judges from around the state and [has been] chaired by Robert L. Haig, Esq. [since its inception]." In addition to providing education about the Commercial Division, the CDAC has regularly recommended Commercial Division rule changes that have been adopted after an opportunity for public comment. Indiana's Commercial Courts Working Group evolved into the Commercial Courts Committee which has been intimately involved with developing Indiana's Commercial Court Pilot Program and permanent courts.

International examples include, among others, the DIFC Courts' "Court Users Committee" and Rules Committee, Scotland's Consultive Committee on Commercial Actions, the Singapore International Commercial Courts Committee, Rwanda's Business Law Reform Cell, and Kenya's Business Court Users Committee.

=== Entities related to bar associations ===
Bar associations are also involved. The Philadelphia Bar Association's Business Litigation Committee plays a role in selecting lawyers as Judges Pro Tempore to serve as court appointed neutrals in Philadelphia Commerce Court cases. The Chicago Bar Association created its Commercial Litigation Committee "to promote discourse between judges and lawyers who handle business-related disputes" with an initial focus on the Law Division's Commercial Calendars. The Boston Bar Association's Business and Commercial Litigation Section holds an annual event, "Business Litigation Session Year in Review", where lawyers hear directly from Business Litigation Session judges. The Florida Bar's Business Law Section has a Business Courts Task Force. The Ohio State Bar Association's Corporation Law Committee urged a detailed resolution to expand the Commercial Docket statewide. The Kentucky Bar Association's Business Law Section put on early programming about Kentucky's newly established business court.

The American Bar Association has a long history in supporting the development of business courts, including, among other things, the creation of an Ad Hoc Committee on Business Courts in the 1990s, which evolved into the permanent Business Courts Subcommittee within the Business Law Section's Business and Corporate Litigation Committee; the development of a Business Court Representatives Program; and a clerkship program placing law students with business court judges for summer clerkships. The Business Law Section's Judges Initiative Committee was inspired by North Carolina Business Court Judge Ben F. Tennille (as was the Business Court Representatives Program), who served as its first judicial co-chair. South Carolina Business Court Judge Clifton Newman, Michigan Business Court Judge Christopher P. Yates, and New York Commercial Division Judge Timothy S. Driscoll have also served as Judges Initiative Committee co-chairs.

=== Private entities ===
Private entities have also carried out implementation or operational studies at the behest of courts. Some examples are: the Institute for the Advancement of the American Legal System studies and reports for Colorado's pilot business courts (Civil Access Pilot Project); the National Center for State Courts (NCSC) Commercial Court Evaluation for the Superior Court of Arizona in Maricopa County and its study of civil programs in Philadelphia's Court of Common Pleas (including its Commerce Court); a private consulting firm's study to create a business court in Atlanta (Fulton County Superior Court); and a good government organization (The Committee of Seventy) study of Philadelphia's Commerce Case Management Program. The NCSC, working with the Tennessee Administrative Office of the Courts, also has developed a curriculum and faculty guide for creating business courts.

The American College of Business Court Judges was established in 2005. Since 1996, the Association of Corporate Counsel has endorsed the creation of business courts in the United States where appropriate.

== Appellate business and commercial courts ==
In 2023, Texas passed a law creating an appellate level business court, the Fifteenth Court of Appeals, which became operational on September 1, 2024. On August 23, 2024, the Texas Supreme Court upheld the constitutionality of the law creating the Fifteenth Court of Appeals. It is the first operational specialized appellate level business court in the United States. In 2020, Pennsylvania passed a law encouraging the Superior Court of Pennsylvania to create a specialized appellate Commerce Court, but that Pennsylvania intermediate appellate court has not done so.

Other appellate courts have been described as commercial or business courts, not by design, but in reference to their actual case work, such as the United States Court of Appeals for the Seventh Circuit, and the Delaware Supreme Court. Retired Seventh Circuit Judge Richard Posner wrote that in the nineteenth century and well into the twentieth century, "t]he New York Court of Appeals was the nation's premier commercial court." The United States Court of Appeals for the Second Circuit has been similarly described as "the country's leading commercial court during the 1940s and 1950s...."

== Business courts and alternative dispute resolution ==
The significant relationship between business courts and alternative dispute resolution (ADR), such as mediation, neutral evaluation, and arbitration, is well recognized, both in seeing business courts as a competitor forum with arbitration, and in using ADR as a complementary adjunct to the litigation process.

Thus, for example, New York Commercial Division Rule 3 allows for court appointed mediators and neutral evaluators, Philadelphia's Commerce Case Management Program created an alternative dispute resolution program using Judges Pro Tempore in mandated settlement conferences, and discretionary referrals to private mediation, the North Carolina Business Court Rules address mandatory mediation, and Florida's Ninth Judicial Circuit Business Court Procedures, Section 8, requires mandatory ADR, and addresses non-binding arbitration as well as mediation. The Michigan Supreme Court business court case management standards emphasize early mediation.

Some U.S. business courts expressly encourage the use of special masters or referees in expediting some types of decision making during the litigation process, for example in North Carolina, Kentucky, New York, Indiana, Orlando, Ft. Lauderdale, and Georgia. Delaware's Court of Chancery also uses magistrates, who can potentially be final decision makers.

The New York Commercial Division and the Metro Atlanta Business Case Division are empowered to hear court-based disputes concerning international arbitration proceedings. A substantial part of the Commercial Court of England and Wales' docket involves arbitration appeals. The Miami-Dade County, Florida Circuit Court has an International Commercial Arbitration Court. Miami circuit judges Jennifer D. Bailey and Lisa S. Walsh have served as both business court judges in the Complex Business Litigation Division and International Commercial Arbitration Court judges.

== Comparison to courts in other jurisdictions ==
Commercial courts outside the United States may have broader or narrower jurisdiction than state trial level business and commercial courts within the United States, for example patent or admiralty jurisdiction; and jurisdiction may vary between countries. The jurisdictional scope of commercial courts outside the United States may have some differences with American state level specialized business and commercial courts. For example, the Business and Property Courts of England and Wales include specialized courts or lists for admiralty, insolvency, and patents, which in the United States would typically be subject to jurisdiction in federal tribunals, such as the United States Bankruptcy Courts or the United States District Courts, and not in specialized state trial level business courts. The scope of any commercial court's jurisdiction may vary between countries.

Some foreign commercial courts include foreign judges with US commercial court experience on their bench, for example, former Delaware vice chancellor and Supreme Court justice Carolyn Berger serving on Singapore's International Commercial Court.

== Advocacy ==
In its 2023 policy resolution, the Association of Corporate Counsel recognizes and endorses the creation and support of business courts internationally, as well as in the United States.

== Business and commercial court judges in the United States since 1993 ==
Following is a non-exhaustive list of business court judges serving over a period of years in U.S. business and commercial courts, in and after 1993, and/or identifying many judges who were pioneers on their bench and/or have had an impact beyond their bench, such as participation in the American College of Business Court Judges (ACBCJ) or American Bar Association. 1993 is when the first modern business court programs began in the United States. The list does not include Chancellors and Vice-Chancellors from the Delaware Court of Chancery, which has been a pre-eminent business court for over a century, and whose judges have held an important place as business court judges over that time.

- Brent T. Adams, Second Judicial District, Washoe County, Nevada, Business Court.
- James M. Alexander (judge), Michigan Circuit Court, Business Court.
- Nancy L. Allf, Business Court, Eighth Judicial District Court, Las Vegas, Clark County, Nevada.
- Jon Van Allsburg, Michigan Circuit Court, Business Court. Van Allsburg has been an Ottawa County Business Court judge since its inception in 2013 (as of May 2024).
- Michael J. Aprahamian, Wisconsin Circuit Court, Commercial Docket Pilot Project. Waukesha County Judge Aprahamiam was on the Business Court Advisory Committee that petitioned to create Wisconsin's Commercial Docket Pilot Project in 2016, was among the first judges to be appointed to the pilot business court after it was approved as a three-year pilot program, and remains a Commercial Docket judge (as of May 2024). Aprahamian has written and spoken extensively in explaining this business court, which was effectively ended on October 7, 2024.
- Leonard B. Austin, New York Supreme Court Commercial Division, Nassau County.
- Louis A. Bledsoe III, North Carolina Superior Court.
- Craig J. Bobay, Indiana Superior Court, Commercial Court.
- Alice D. Bonner, Fulton County Georgia Superior Court Business Case Division, later Metro Atlanta Business Case Division. In 2005, Bonner was appointed as one of the original judges in the Business Case Division. She continued serving for over 15 years. She participated in the first meeting of the American College of Business Court Judges in 2005.
- Herman Cahn, New York Commercial Division. In 1993, Cahn was appointed as one of the original pilot Commercial Part judges in Manhattan, after he had been instrumental in creating this pilot business court. He continued his role as a business court judge after the creation of the Commercial Division in 1995, serving there until 2008.
- Audrey J.S. Carrion, Circuit Court of Baltimore City, Maryland, Business and Technology Case Management Program.
- Carolyn E. Demarest, New York Commercial Division, Brooklyn, Kings County.
- Mark R. Denton, Eighth Judicial District Court, Nevada, Business Court. Denton has served in the Las Vegas District Court's business court docket for over 15 years. He is the immediate past president of the American College of Business Court Judges.
- John P. DiBlasi, New York Commercial Division. DiBlasi was the first Commercial Division judge in Westchester County in 1999, and served in the Commercial Division for ten years. Now a nationally known mediator, he was early to implement ADR in the Commercial Division.
- Timothy S. Driscoll, New York Supreme Court Commercial Division, Nassau County.
- Elizabeth Hazlitt Emerson, New York Supreme Court Commercial Division, Suffolk County.
- Helen E. Freedman, New York Supreme Court Commercial Division, New York County.
- Gill S. Freeman, Eleventh Judicial Circuit of Florida, Miami-Dade County, Complex Business Litigation Section.
- James L. Gale, North Carolina Business Court.
- Ira Gammerman, New York Supreme Court Commercial Division, Manhattan.
- Allan van Gestel, Suffolk (Massachusetts) Superior Court, Business Litigation Session.
- Gary S. Glazer, Philadelphia, Pennsylvania Court of Common Pleas, Commerce Case Management Program.
- Allen S. Goldberg, Circuit Court of Cook County, Illinois, Commercial Calendar.
- Elizabeth Gonzalez, Eighth Judicial District Court, Clark County, Nevada, Business Court.
- John W. Herron, Philadelphia Court of Common Pleas Commerce Case Management Program.
- Joseph Iannazzone, State Court of Gwinnett County, Georgia Business Court, later Metro Atlanta Business Case Division. Iannazzone was one of two judges in Gwinnett County's Business Court, which later joined the Metro Atlanta Business Case Division. He is a past president of the American College of Business Court Judges.
- Mary Miller Johnston, Superior Court of Delaware, Complex Commercial Litigation Division.
- John R. Jolly Jr., North Carolina Business Court. Jolly served on the Business Court from 2005 to 2014, 2011 to 2014 as its Chief Judge. Jolly participated in the first meeting of the American College of Business Court Judges in 2005.
- M. Randall Jurrens, Circuit Court of Michigan, Business Court. Jurrens was appointed to the Saginaw County Business Court upon its inception in 2013, and remains a judge in that program (as of May 2024), with his term currently ending in 2025.
- Deborah H. Karalunas, New York Supreme Court Commercial Division, Onondaga County (Syracuse).
- Elizabeth E. Long, Fulton County Georgia Superior Court Business Case Division, later Metro Atlanta Business Case Division. In 2005, Long was appointed as one of the original judges in the Business Case Division. She continued serving for over 15 years. She participated in the first meeting of the American College of Business Court Judges in 2005.
- Ellen Hobbs Lyle, Davidson County (Nashville), Tennessee Chancery Court, Business Court Pilot Project. In 2015, Hobbs Lyle became Tennessee's first business court judge, and established the new program as its sole judge through the end of 2017, and as one of two into 2019.
- Albert J. Matricciani, Jr., Circuit Court of Baltimore City, Maryland, Business and Technology Case Management Program.
- Patricia A. McInerney, Philadelphia Court of Common Pleas, Commerce Case Management Program.
- Richard B. McNamara, New Hampshire Superior Court, Business and Commercial Dispute Docket.
- Clifton B. Newman, South Carolina Circuit Court Business Court.
- Steven I. Platt, Circuit Court of Maryland, Business and Technology Case Management Program.
- Charles Ramos, New York Commercial Division. Ramos served as a Commercial Division judge in Manhattan from 1996 to 2018. During his tenure, in 2013, Ramos was designated to hear all international arbitration cases before the Commercial Division.
- Randolph G. Rich, State Court of Gwinnett County Georgia Business Court, Metro Atlanta Business Case Division. Then State Court Judge Randy Rich implemented Gwinnett County's Business Court as a pilot program over 15 years ago, and remained a Business Court judge in Gwinnett until that program became part of the Metro Atlanta Business Case Division, where, by then Superior Court Judge Rich continued to serve as a business court judge until 2020.
- Renee A. Roche, Ninth Judicial Circuit of Florida, Business Court.
- Ronald B. Rubin, Circuit Court of Maryland, Business and Technology Case Management Program (BTCMP). Rubin served on the Montgomery County Circuit Court BTCMP from 2008 to November 2021, and has continued to serve in that program as a senior judge (as of May 2024). He has been the statewide BTCMP's most prolific opinion writer.
- J. Stephen Schuster, who handled complex business litigation in the Superior Court of Cobb County, Georgia, is a past president of the American College of Business Court Judges, past co-chair of the ABA Section of Business Law's Judges Initiative Committee, and served as a Business Court Representative to the ABA's Business Law Section.
- Albert W. Sheppard Jr., Philadelphia, Pennsylvania Court of Common Pleas Commerce Case Management Program.
- Patrick J. Sherlock, Circuit Court of Cook County, Illinois, Commercial Calendar. Sherlock was first assigned to the Chicago Circuit Court's Commercial Calendar in 2013, and is now the Supervising Judge of the Commercial Calendars (as of May 2024).
- Michael A. Silverstein, Rhode Island Superior Court Business Calendar.
- Joseph R. Slights III, Delaware Superior Court Complex Commercial Litigation Division and Delaware Court of Chancery.
- Thomas Benton Smith (judge), Ninth Judicial Circuit of Florida, Business Court.
- Thomas A. Stander, New York Seventh Judicial District Commercial Division, Monroe County. The Rochester based Commercial Division was created simultaneously with the Manhattan Commercial Division, effective November 6, 1995, with Stander selected to be its first judge, serving until 2005. He pursued active case management as a key objective.
- Brian P. Stern, Rhode Island Superior Court, Business Calendar.
- Brian R. Sullivan, Michigan Circuit Court, Business Court. Sullivan has been a Business Court judge in Wayne County (Detroit) since the Business Court's inception in 2013 (as of May 2024).
- John Telleen, Iowa District Court, Business Specialty Court. Seventh Judicial District Judge Telleen was one of the three judges originally appointed to the Iowa Business Specialty Court Pilot Project in 2013, and remains one of the judges on the permanent court (as of May 2024). He is a Director of the American College of Business Court Judges.
- Ben F. Tennille, North Carolina Business Court.
- Sean D. Wallace, Circuit Court of Maryland.
- Christine A. Ward, Court of Common Pleas of Allegheny County (Pittsburgh), Pennsylvania, Commerce and Complex Litigation Center. Ward was one of two judges appointed in 2007 to serve on the newly created Commerce and Complex Litigation Center, along with legendary Pennsylvania Judge R. Stanton Wettick Jr. She remains a judge in that program, as of May 2024, while also serving as the Civil Division's Administrative Judge. Judge Ward is a past president of the American College of Business Court Judges.
- Heather A. Welch, Marion County, Indiana, Superior Court, Commercial Court.
- Ira B. Warshawsky, New York Commercial Division. Warshawsky served as a Commercial Division Judge in Nassau County from 2002 to 2011, and is a past president of the American College of Business Court Judges.
- Craig L. Wellerson, Superior Court of New Jersey, Complex Business Litigation Program (CBLP). Ocean County Judge Wellerson was among the first set of county judges designated to the CBLP at its 2015 inception. He remains a CBLP judge (as of May 2024), and is Chair of the Committee of Complex Business Litigation Judges.
- Christopher C. Wilkes, Circuit Court of West Virginia, Business Court Division.
- Robert C. Wilson, Superior Court of New Jersey, Bergen County, Complex Business Litigation Program (CBLP). Wilson was assigned as the CBLP judge in Bergen County when that program began in 2015, until his replacement in 2023, but even before that he had experience as a business court judge in Bergen County, which had a history of specialized assignments of complex commercial cases.
- Christopher P. Yates, Kent County, Michigan Circuit Court, Business Court.
- Roger M. Young, Sr., South Carolina Circuit Court, Business Court. Ninth Judicial Circuit (Charleston) Judge Young was among the first judges appointed to the Business Court in 2007, was appointed Chief Business Court Judge for Administrative Purposes in 2016, and through later orders has been reappointed to that position (as of May 2024).
