= Steven I. Platt =

American judge (born 1947)

Judge, Circuit Court of Maryland, Prince George's County (Recalled senior judge through 2024)
- In office May 7, 1990 – January 15, 2007

Judge, Prince George's County District Court
- In office 1986–1990

Judge, Prince George's County Orphans' Court
- In office 1978–1986

Personal details
- Born: 1947 (age 78–79) Virginia
- Education: University of Virginia (B.A. 1969); American University Washington College of Law (J.D. 1973)

Steven I. Platt (born 1947) is a retired American judge who served in Maryland's state courts for nearly 30 years until his retirement in 2007, and has continued to serve as a recalled senior judge since that time (as of 2024). Platt has held numerous leadership positions within the judiciary itself, and on committees and other bodies affecting the judiciary and legal practice in Maryland. He is a national leader among business court judges.

== Judicial service ==
Platt served in three different branches of the Prince George's County, Maryland courts from 1978 to 2007: Orphans' Court, District Court, and the Circuit Court.

Maryland's district courts are courts of limited jurisdiction over criminal misdemeanors and limited types of felonies, and civil cases worth less than $30,000. Orphans' courts handle probate and estate matters. The circuit courts are courts of general jurisdiction over serious criminal matters, major civil cases, and juvenile, family law, and domestic violence cases. Unlike district courts, cases in the circuit courts may be heard before a judge or a jury.

Platt was a judge of the Orphans' Court from 1978 to 1986, serving as its Chief Judge in 1985 and 1986. From 1986 to 1990 he served as a judge in the Prince George's County District Court. From 1986 to 1988, he was cross-designated to the county's circuit court, the 7th Judicial Circuit, and he was the district court's Administrative Judge from 1988 to 1990.

Platt began his service as a circuit court judge on the 7th Judicial Circuit on May 7, 1990, and served there until January 15, 2007. He was the Coordinating Judge of the Family Law Division from 1993 to 1997, and Coordinating Judge for Criminal Operations from 2001 to 2003. While serving on the circuit court, Platt was chair of the Strategic Planning and Total Quality Management Council from 1995 to 2001, and chair of the Strategic Planning Committee from 2001 to 2007. Platt also served as chair of the 2005 Auto Crimes Court Feasibility Study Committee for Prince George's County. He is recognized as an architect of the Prince George's circuit court's Drug Court Program. He retired as a full-time judge in January 2007.

After retirement, Platt has served as a recalled judge. Under Maryland law, former judges may be recalled to temporary service as judges in pending cases if they meet certain requirements, which can vary among different county circuit courts. Platt has been approved for judicial recall service in all of Maryland's circuit courts. As recently as May 2024, Platt was issuing significant rulings in climate change cases brought against major oil companies by the City of Annapolis in the Anne Arundel County, Maryland circuit court.

=== Platt as a business court judge and leader ===
Platt played a central role in creating a statewide business court in Maryland's circuit courts, known as the Business and Technology Case Management Program (BTCMP), which became operational in 2003. In 2000, he was vice-chair of the legislatively created Business and Technology Division Task Force, which produced a report recommending creation of a business and technology court program in Maryland's circuit courts.

In 2001, Maryland's Court of Appeals (now known as Maryland's Supreme Court) created the BTCMP Implementation Committee, making Platt chair of that committee. That committee produced a report setting out the details, design, and goals for implementing the BTCMP across Maryland's circuit courts. This included a recommendation, among others, that the Conference of Circuit Judges create a standing committee to operate in connection with the development of the BTCMP. Subsequently, Platt was made the first chair of the Conference of Circuit Judges BTCMP's Designated Judges and Implementation Committee, which he led from 2001 to 2007. As a specialized business court judge handling cases himself, Platt was the 7th Circuit's Designated Supervising Judge for BTCMP cases from the program's actual opening in 2003 until his retirement in 2007.

Platt has also been involved nationally and internationally as a leader in the community of business court judges. He was a founding member and a president of the American College of Business Court Judges; and a member of the executive committee that organized the first meeting of the American College of Business Court Judges in 2005, co-sponsored by Brookings Institution and the American Enterprise Institute.

In 2012, as part of the United States Department of Commerce's Commercial Law Development Program, Platt was among three commercial court judges (including Ben F. Tennille and Dubai's chief commercial court judge), who spoke in Dubai to a group of Iraqi judges in the early stages of creating commercial courts in Iraq, on developing best practices for court procedures and case management systems in their new court.

== Work and positions before and after being a judge ==
Platt worked at the private law firms of Stern, Platt & Risner and Platt & Risner from 1976 to 1986, and was a partner at the later firm from 1981 to 1986.

In 1981, Platt was chair of the Prince George's County Council Labor Law Revision Task Force. From 1977 to 1978, Platt was chair of the Prince George's County Human Relations Commission. In 1977, he was also a member of the county's Department of Social Services' Adoption Advisory Committee. He has also chaired the Prince George's County's Domestic Violence Coordinating Group.

After retiring as a judge in 2007, Platt formed his own private alternative dispute resolution firm, The Platt Group, which employs as neutrals the services of 16 retired judges (in addition to Platt) and 10 other individuals (as of August 2024), providing mediation, arbitration, discovery dispute resolution and other forms of alternative dispute resolution services.

For 13 years, Platt was a regular columnist for The Daily Record, a leading legal newspaper in Baltimore, Maryland. Some of his columns have been collected and published in three separate volumes. He has also written a memoir of his experiences, Lessons Lived and Learned: My Life On and Off the Bench.

== Judicial law clerk ==
From 1973 to 1975, Platt served as a judicial law clerk to Chief Judge Ernest A. Loveless Jr. of the Prince George's County Circuit Court.

== Education ==
Platt received his Bachelor of Arts degree from the University of Virginia in 1969, and his Juris Doctor degree from American University Washington College of Law in 1973.

Platt has served on the faculty of Prince George's Community College.

== Positions and memberships ==
Platt has held the following positions or memberships, among others;

- President, American College of Business Court Judges (2006-2007)
- President, Prince George's County Bar Association (1988–1989)
- Member, Legislative Committee Workgroup to Study Judicial Selection (2022–2023)
- Member, Maryland Judicial Conference Senior Judges Committee (2022–2024)
- Member, Board of Governors, Maryland State Bar Association (1988–1990)
- Member, Governor's Commission to Reform Maryland's Pretrial System (2014)
- Member, Judicial Advisory Board, American Enterprise Institute/Brookings Joint Center for Regulatory Studies (2004–2007)
- Chair, Maryland Business and Technology Case Management Program Implementation Committee (2001)
- Vice-chair, Maryland Business and Technology Division Task Force (2000)
- Chair, Maryland Conference of Circuit Judges Business and Technology Case Management Program's Designated Judges and Implementation Committee (2001 to 2007)
- Coordinating Judge, Prince George's County Circuit Court Family Law Division (1993 to 1997)
- Coordinating Judge, Prince George's County Circuit Court Criminal Operations (2001 to 2003)
- Administrative Judge, Prince George's County District Court (1988 to 1990)
- Chief Judge, Prince George's County Orphans' Court (1985–1986)
- Chair, Circuit Court Auto Crimes Court Feasibility Study Committee for Prince George's County (2005)
- Chair, Circuit Court Strategic Planning Committee (2001 to 2007)
- Chair, Circuit Court Strategic Planning and Total Quality Management Council (1995 to 2001)
- President, Marlborough Inn of Court (1992–94)
- Regional Board of Directors, Prince George's County United Way
- Chair, Board of Trustees, Henson Valley Montessori School (1985–87)

== Awards and honors ==
Platt has received the following awards and honors, among others;

- Innovator of the Year, The Daily Record (2003)
- Maryland Leadership in Law Award, The Daily Record (2001)
- Distinguished Alumnus Award, American University Washington College of Law (1999)
- Conflict Resolution Award, National Conference of Christians and Jews (1995)
- Distinguished Service to the Judiciary Award, Philippine Lawyers Association of Metropolitan Washington, DC (1991)
