= Albert J. Matricciani Jr. =

American judge (born 1947)

Albert J. Matricianni Jr.

Judge, Appellate Court of Maryland
- In office September 2, 2008 – April 30, 2014
- Appointed by: Martin O'Malley

Judge, Baltimore City Circuit Court
- In office January 20, 1995 – September 2, 2008
- Appointed by: William Donald Schaefer

Personal details
- Born: 1947 (age 78–79) Baltimore, Maryland, U.S.
- Education: Villanova University (BA); University of Maryland, Baltimore (JD); Johns Hopkins University (MLA); St. Johns College (MALA)

Albert J. Matricciani Jr. (born 1947) is a retired American judge in the state of Maryland, who served both at the trial and appellate levels of Maryland's state court system. As a trial level judge, Matricianni was in charge of the Baltimore Circuit Court's Family Law Division for five years, and was later instrumental in creating the statewide Business and Technology Case Management Program. He was President of the Baltimore City Bar Association, and served in leadership in numerous entities and organizations of a legal or charitable nature.

== Judicial service ==
Matricciani was an Associate Judge on the Maryland Court of Special Appeals (now the Appellate Court of Maryland), Maryland's intermediate appellate court, from 2008 to 2014; and an Associate Judge on the Circuit Court for Baltimore City from 1995 to 2008. He was appointed to the Circuit Court by Governor William Donald Schaefer in December 1994. He was appointed to the Court of Special Appeals in 2008 by Governor Martin O'Malley.

=== Matricciani as head of Family Division and involvement in family law ===
From 1996-2001, Matricciani was the Judge-in-Charge of the Circuit Court's Family Division. From 1996 to 1998, he was Vice-Chair of the Family Violence Council. From 1998 to 2001, he chaired the Family and Domestic Relations Law Committee of the Maryland Judicial Conference. In 2000, the Women's Law Center of Maryland awarded Matricciani the Rosalyn B. Bell Award. This award recognizes outstanding achievement in family law.

=== Matricciani's role in creating Maryland's business court ===
Maryland's Circuit Courts are trial level courts of general jurisdiction, and since 2003 have included a business court, the Business and Technology Case Management Program (BTCMP), with specialized jurisdiction over business, commercial, and technology-based litigation. At that time, the BTCMP's emphasis on jurisdiction over technology disputes was an innovation.

Matricciani played a central role in the actual development and shaping of this new business court. In 2000, Maryland’s General Assembly passed legislation creating a task force to study creating a BTCMP, and it later issued its report recommending that a BTCMP be implemented in Maryland's trial courts. Following that recommendation, Maryland’s highest court (then the Court of Appeals and now known as the Maryland Supreme Court) took on the role of establishing an implementation committee, to design and create this new business court.

In 2001, Maryland’s Chief Judge Robert M. Bell delegated the creation of this new business court to Maryland’s Conference of Circuit Judges (the conference). The conference then created the Conference of Circuit Judges Business and Technology Case Management Program Implementation Committee (the implementation committee), consisting of one judge from each of Maryland’s eight circuit courts. Matricciani was selected as the committee judge from the Baltimore City Circuit Court.

The implementation committee established multiple working groups, ultimately involving over 150 people. During this time, Matricciani also chaired the Advisory Council to the Circuit Court for Baltimore City (the advisory council). This advisory council, chaired by Matricciani, met regularly in 2001 and provided the implementation committee assistance in its developing the BTCMP.

Matricciani was a Director of Baltimore City's BTCMP from 2001 to 2008, and was one of the first judges assigned to the BTCMP in Baltimore City's Circuit Court when that program became operational in 2003. The first five legal opinions published on the statewide BTCMP website are all issued by Matricciani.

Matricciani's role as a business court judge was also national. In 2005, he was a founding member of the American College of Business Court Judges. He was also in the first class of state business court judges serving as Business Court Representatives to the American Bar Association's Business Law Section.

== Legal practice ==
Matricciani was admitted to the Maryland Bar in 1974. He was an attorney with the Legal Aid Bureau from 1974 to 1980, and worked with various private law firms from 1974 to 1995. Before becoming a judge in 1995, he was a partner at the law firm Whiteford, Taylor & Preston, LLP in its litigation department from 1987 to 1995, and after serving as a judge he was at that firm as Senior Counsel from 2014 to 2018.

== Education ==
Matricciani received his B.A. from Villanova University in 1969, his Juris Doctor degree from the University of Maryland School of Law in 1973, and an M.L.A. from Johns Hopkins University in 1975. He studied at the St. Johns College Graduate Institute in Annapolis, Maryland, where he received an MALA degree (Master of Arts in Liberal Arts) in 2021.

As an educator, he has been an adjunct professor at the University of Maryland School of Law since 2003. Since 2007, he has also served as a State Business Court Advisor to the University of Maryland School of Law's Journal of Business and Technology Law. In 2009, he published an article in that journal addressing the U.S. Supreme Court's role in the context of applying federal securities law.

== Honors and awards ==
Among others, Matricciani has received the following honors and awards;

- James J. Hanks, Jr. Lifetime Achievement Award from the Business Law Section of the Maryland State Bar Association (2017). This award is given annually "to a retired or practicing attorney whose lifetime achievements have contributed to the practice of business law...."
- Maryland Top Leadership in Law Award from The Daily Record (2004). The award is presented annually by The Daily Record and Maryland State Bar Association to outstanding lawyers and judges.
- The Anselm Sodaro Judicial Civility Award from the Maryland State Bar Association (2002). This "award is presented to the sitting judge who demonstrates judicial temperament, civility and courtesy to attorneys and litigants...."
- The Women's Law Center of Maryland's Rosalyn B. Bell Award for outstanding achievement in family law (2000)
- The Benjamin L. Cardin Pro Bono Service Award from the University of Maryland School of Law Alumni Association (1995). It is presented "to an alum who has demonstrated significant and substantial contributions to furthering ideals of public service in the law."

== Positions ==
Matricciani has held many positions over the years relating to the law or other public service, in addition to working as a judge or litigator. Many of these references listed below are derived from the State of Maryland's On-Line Manual biography for Matricciani. Among other positions Matricianni has held;

- Chair, Mayor's Drug Abuse Advisory Council for Baltimore City (1983 to 1985)
- President, Baltimore City Bar Association (1995–96)
- Member, Maryland State Bar Association's select committee on gender equality (1996 to 1998)
- Member, Maryland Judicial Conference's Executive Committee (1998 to 2000)
- Board of directors, the Maryland Humanities Council (1998 to 2005)
- Member, Maryland Court of Appeals (now known as the Maryland Supreme Court) Standing Committee on Rules of Practice and Procedure (2005 to 2008)
- Life member of the American Law Institute
- President, ADR Maryland
- Board of directors, the Homeless Persons Representation Project (2014), an organization working to end homelessness in Maryland.

In 2013, Matricianni helped create a "Docket for Homeless Persons in the District Court of Baltimore City...." He was a founding member of the American College of Business Court Judges. Matricianni was in the first class of state business court judges serving as Business Court Representatives to the American Bar Association's Business Law Section.
