= Louis A. Bledsoe III =

American judge

Judge, North Carolina Business Court
- In office July 1, 2014 – January 1, 2025
- Appointed by: Governor Pat McCrory, and reappointed in 2019 by Governor Roy Cooper
- Preceded by: Calvin E. Murphy

Chief Judge North Carolina Business Court (2018-2024)

Personal details
- Born: Charlotte, North Carolina
- Education: University of North Carolina at Chapel Hill (A.B. 1981); Harvard Law School (J.D., cum laude, 1984)

Louis A. Bledsoe III is an American judge serving on the North Carolina Business Court. He became its Chief Judge in 2018. Bledsoe received numerous honors as an undergraduate at the University of North Carolina, graduated with honors from Harvard Law School, held a prestigious federal clerkship with the United States Court of Appeals for the Fourth Circuit, was a commercial and business litigator with a law firm for 29 years before being appointed and reappointed to North Carolina's Business Court where he will have served from 2018 through 2024 as its Chief Judge.

== Education ==
Bledsoe received his Bachelor of Arts degree from the University of North Carolina at Chapel Hill in 1981, and his Juris Doctor degree from Harvard Law School, cum laude, in 1984.

Bledsoe graduated from North Carolina Phi Beta Kappa. He was a Morehead (now Morehead-Cain) Scholar, the first merit- based scholarship program at an American University. As a graduating senior, he was the recipient of the William P. Jacocks Award, now known as the Walter S. Spearman Award. This is a University of North Carolina Chancellor's Award based on "academic achievements, co-curricular activities, leadership qualities, and strength of character [which] are considered by a panel of judges to be most outstanding."

== Legal career ==
=== Judicial service ===
In 2014, Bledsoe was appointed as a Special Superior Court Judge by North Carolina Governor Pat McCrory, and then designated by North Carolina Supreme Court Justice Sarah Parker as a Special Superior Court Judge for Complex Business Cases, assigning him to serve on North Carolina's Business Court. He replaced Business Court Judge Calvin E. Murphy. The North Carolina Business Court is a specialized business court of limited jurisdiction within the North Carolina Superior Court, that primarily hears cases "involving complex and significant issues of corporate and commercial law."

In 2018, Bledsoe was designated by North Carolina Supreme Court Chief Justice Mark Martin as the Business Court's Chief Judge, succeeding Chief Judge James L. Gale. In 2019, Governor Roy Cooper nominated Bledsoe for reappointment to the Business Court, in which North Carolina's legislature concurred, and Bledsoe has continued serving as Chief Judge. Bledsoe announced he will be retiring effective January 1, 2025.

Bledsoe has issued approximately 500 written legal opinions and orders of significance during his time as a Business Court judge. Among Bledsoe's notable cases, the Atlantic Coast Conference's lawsuits with Clemson University and Florida State University have drawn national attention. Nationally, Bledsoe has served as a Business Court Representative to the American Bar Association's Business Law Section. He is a member of the American College of Business Court Judges.

=== Legal practice ===
After completing his federal appellate clerkship, Bledsoe joined the private law firm of Robinson, Bradshaw & Hinson, P.A. in Charlotte, North Carolina. He was a commercial and business litigator at the firm for the next 29 years, until he was appointed to North Carolina's Business Court.

Bledsoe was among the lawyers in the 2001 North Carolina Business Court case, First Union v. SunTrust Banks, heard by Judge Ben F. Tennille. This case, involving a disputed bank merger, has been described as giving complex business litigation "sea legs" to the Business Court. Bledsoe considered it one of the highlights of his career as a lawyer, as he recognized at the time it "was a very significant event in the history of the state".

=== Judicial clerkship ===
After graduating law school, in 1984 to 1985 Bledsoe served as a law clerk to the Honorable Sam J. Ervin, III on the United States Court of Appeals for the Fourth Circuit.

== Honors and positions ==
Bledsoe has served in the following positions or received the following honors, among others;

- Chief Judge, North Carolina Business Court (2018–2024)
- The Order of the Long Leaf Pine Award (2024)
- Business Court Representative to American Bar Association Business Law Section
- The Charlotte Business Journal designated Bledsoe with its "40 Under 40" honors
- Chair, Board of Trustees of the Charlotte Country Day School, and Alumnus of the Year (2012)
- Honors at University of North Carolina: Morehead (now Morehead-Cain) Scholar; Phi Beta Kappa; William P. Jacocks Award
- Graduated Harvard Law School with honors
