= John Tisdale =

American judge

Associate Judge for the Circuit Court for Frederick County
- In office January 23, 1995 – July 1, 2011

Personal details
- Born: June 21, 1945 (age 81) Washington, D.C., United States
- Education: United States Naval Academy, B.S. (1967); Washington and Lee University School of Law, J.D. (1974)

John H. Tisdale (born June 21, 1945) is an American lawyer and retired associate judge for the Circuit Court of Frederick County, Maryland.

== Early life and education ==
Tisdale was born in Washington, D.C., on June 21, 1945. He attended the United States Naval Academy, receiving a Bachelor of Science in 1967. Following this degree, Tisdale served in the United States Navy from 1967 until 1971. Tisdale later attended Washington and Lee University School of Law receiving a Juris Doctor degree in 1974.

== Career ==
Tisdale was admitted to both the Maryland State Bar Association and Virginia State Bar in 1974.

Tisdale joined the Frederick County Bar Association, serving as Secretary from 1994 to 1995. In 1998, Tisdale became President of the Frederick County Bar Association.

Tisdale retired on July 1, 2011.

== Awards ==
- Anselm Sodaro Judicial Civility Award, Maryland State Bar Association (2011)
