= Leonard B. Austin =

American judge

Associate Justice, New York Supreme Court, Appellate Division Appointed in 2009, Elected in 2012
- In office 2009–2022
- Appointed by: Governor David A. Paterson

Justice, New York Supreme Court, Elected 1998
- In office 1999–2009

Personal details
- Education: Georgetown University (B.A. 1974); Hofstra University School of Law (J.D. 1977)
- Awards: Stanley B. Fuld Award, 2022

Leonard B. Austin is a retired American judge in New York state, who served in both the trial level New York Supreme Court and in the Supreme Court, Appellate Division. He served as a business court judge in the Nassau County Supreme Court's Commercial Division from 2000 to 2009. In 2003, he became chair of the Commercial Division Rules Committee which was responsible for developing a uniform set of rules of Commercial Division courts across New York. Austin handled thousands of cases as a trial level and appellate judge. He is a past-president of the American College of Business Court Judges. Since retiring as a judge, he has served as a neutral and has been rated among the top 10 private arbitrators in New York.

== Judicial service ==
In 1998, Austin was elected as a judge to the Tenth Judicial District of the trial level New York Supreme Court. In 1999, he served in the Dedicated Matrimonial Part in the Suffolk County Supreme Court. In October 2000, he was assigned to the Nassau County Supreme Court's Commercial Division, a specialized business court, where he served until 2009. In 2009, Governor David A. Paterson appointed Austin to be an Associate Justice in New York's intermediate appellate court, the New York Supreme Court Appellate Division, Second Department. He was reelected in 2012. Austin retired from the Appellate Division in 2022.

Austin handled approximately 1,000 cases in the Appellate Division during his tenure. As a Commercial Division judge, "he heard and resolved well over 2,000 cases addressing a wide variety of commercial matters, including corporate (limited liability company and partnership dissolutions; shareholder derivative claims), employment issues (including restrictive covenants), and construction contract claims." As a trial court judge, he decided approximately 500 cases per year, "of which more than nearly 100 were published annually."

== Legal practice ==
Austin was in the private practice of law from 1978 to 1998. After his retirement from the Appellate Division, Austin has provided alternative dispute resolution services, and has been recognized as a top 10 arbitrator in New York Law Journal surveys.

== Education ==
Austin received his B.A. from Georgetown University in 1974, and his Juris Doctor degree from Hofstra University School of Law in 1977. He attended the Jewish Theological Seminary in the Summer of 1973. He has been an adjunct professor at Hofstra University School of Law since 2002.

== Honors and positions ==
Austin received the 2022 Stanley B. Fuld Award from the Commercial and Federal Litigation Section of the New York State Bar Association. The award is given to "honor leaders in law for their outstanding contributions to the development of commercial law and jurisprudence in New York state."

Since August 2022, Austin is a member of the New York State Commission on Ethics and Lobbying in Government, becoming its permanent Vice Chair in 2023.

In 2003, while still a Supreme Court justice, he served as Chairman of the Commercial Division Rules Committee and was involved in authoring the Uniform Commercial Division Rules which were implemented in early 2006 (and which have been modified over the years). In 2014, even after moving to the Appellate Division, he was selected to serve as a member of the Chief Judge's Commercial Division Advisory Council. He has also served on the Pattern Jury Instruction Committee.

Austin is a past-president of the American College of Business Court Judges. He served as a Business Court Representative to the American Bar Association's Business Law Section.
