= James L. Gale =

Former American judge

Judge, North Carolina Business Court
- In office March 2011 – September 2021
- Appointed by: Governor Bev Perdue
- Preceded by: Ben F. Tennille
- Succeeded by: Julianna Threall Earp

Chief Judge, North Carolina Business Court, 2014 - 2018

Personal details
- Born: Alabama
- Education: Florida Presbyterian College (B.A. 1969); University of Georgia School of Law (J.D., magna cum laude, 1974)

James L. Gale is a retired American judge who served on North Carolina's Business Court from 2011 to 2021, including three years as its Chief Judge. He also has been involved nationally and internationally in explaining and developing specialized business courts.

== Judicial service ==
In March 2011, Gale was appointed by North Carolina Governor Bev Perdue to serve on North Carolina's Business Court, as a Special Superior Court Judge for Complex Business Cases. This is a specialized business court docket of limited jurisdiction within the North Carolina Superior Court, that primarily hears cases "involving complex and significant issues of corporate and commercial law." Gale's 35 years of private legal practice as a lawyer before being appointed as a business court judge included a focus on complex business and commercial disputes. Gale succeeded retiring judge Ben F. Tennille. During his tenure, Gale maintained his chambers at Elon University School of Law, rather than a courthouse, where he also served as an adjunct professor. Gale retired in 2021, being succeeded by Judge Julianna Threall Earp.

Gale served as the North Carolina Business Court's Chief Judge from 2014 to 2018. In 2016, North Carolina's General Assembly created the position of Senior Business Court Judge, with Gale ultimately being the first to serve in that role. During his ten years on the Business Court, Gale authored over 200 written legal opinions.

Gale has played a prominent role nationally, and some role internationally, in the development of business and commercial courts. He has provided advice on the creation or operations of specialized business courts in at least Maryland, Wyoming, Wisconsin, Georgia, Kentucky, and Tennessee, as well as in Haiti and Bahrain. He spoke in Bahrain "on behalf of the U.S. Department of Commerce ... on the concepts of business courts there and in other Middle East countries." He was among a delegation to Haiti's Supreme Court in 2018, speaking "on the importance of written adjudication and precedents in a stable business economy."

In Spring 2016, he spoke at a symposium in Baltimore, Maryland organized by a task force addressing potential improvement to Maryland's business court (the Business and Technology Case Management Program). Gale was quoted numerous times in the task force's January 2017 final report. In 2017, he addressed the Georgia Statewide Business Court Subcommittee studying the merits of a statewide business court in Georgia. In 2019, he spoke in Kentucky on that state's newly created business court.

Gale serves as a Director of the American College of Business Court Judges. He served as a Business Court Representative to the American Bar Association's (ABA) Business Law Section. He has previously served as co-chair of the Business Courts Subcommittee of that Section's Corporate and Business Litigation Committee. He has been an editor of the Business Courts chapter in the ABA book, Recent Developments in Business and Corporate Litigation, an annual publication of the ABA's Business Law Section.

== Legal practice ==
After his judicial clerkship, Gale joined the private law firm Smith Moore Leatherwood LLP (today part of Fox Rothschild), where he went on to practice for 35 years before being appointed to North Carolina's Business Court.

== Judicial clerkship ==
Gale served as a federal judicial law clerk to Judge Franklin T. Dupree Jr. of the United States District Court for the Eastern District of North Carolina.

== Education ==
Gale received his Bachelor of Arts degree in 1969 from Florida Presbyterian College, now known as Eckerd College, and his Juris Doctor degree, magna cum laude, from the University of Georgia School of Law in 1974.

== Awards and honors ==
In 2021, Gale received the Distinguished Service Award from the North Carolina Bar Association's Antitrust & Complex Business Disputes Law Section. This is "an honor bestowed every other year on recipients who demonstrate the highest ethical standards, professional competence, and contributions to the section and/or the fields of antitrust or complex business disputes law." Gale received the 2021-2022 Elon University School of Law's Leadership in the Law Award. For several years before taking the bench, Gale was named by Law and Politics Magazine as one of North Carolina's top 100 “Super Lawyers”.

== Positions and memberships ==
Gale has held the following positions, among others;

- Judicial advisor to The Sedona Conference
- Director, American College of Business Court Judges
- Co-chair, Business Courts Subcommittee of the American Bar Association's (ABA) Business Law Section's Corporate and Business Litigation Committee
- Editor of the Business Courts chapter in Recent Developments in Business and Corporate Litigation, an annual publication of ABA's Business Law Section
- Business Courts Representative to the ABA's Business Law Section
- Council member, Antitrust, Trade Regulation and Complex Business Disputes Law Section for the North Carolina Bar Association
- Adjunct professor, Elon University School of Law
