= Deborah H. Karalunas =

American judge (born 1956)

Administrative Judge, Fifth Judicial District, New York Supreme Court
- Assuming office July 10, 2023
- Appointed by: Chief Administrative Judge Joseph A. Zayas
- Succeeding: James P. Murphy

Justice, New York Supreme Court, Elected in 2002, Re-Elected in 2016 (14 year-term)

Personal details
- Born: 1956 (age 69–70)
- Education: Cornell University (B.A. 1978); Syracuse University College of Law (J.D. cum laude, 1982)

Deborah H. Karalunas is an American judge serving on the trial level New York Supreme Court in Onondaga County. She has been a justice on that court since being elected in 2002, and in 2023 she became the first female Administrative Judge for the 5th Judicial District of the New York Supreme Court (still holding that position as of July 2024). She has been the President of the Association of Justices of the Supreme Court of the State of New York, and received that association's Justice Martin J. Evans Award for Judicial Excellence and Leadership, among other awards during her career.

== Judicial service ==
In 2002, Karalunas was elected as a trial level New York Supreme Court justice in the 5th Judicial District, which includes Herkimer, Jefferson, Lewis, Oneida, Onondaga and Oswego Counties. Karalunas sits in Syracuse, Onandaga County, New York. In 2007, she was appointed as the presiding justice in the New York Commercial Division of Onondaga County, a specialized business court. She was reelected to a second 14-year term in 2016.

On July 10, 2023, while still serving as a business court judge in the Commercial Division, she was appointed Administrative Judge of the 5th Judicial District by New York's Chief Administrative Judge Joseph A. Zayas, succeeding Judge James P. Murphy. Karalunas was the first woman ever appointed to this position. At the time of her original election to the 5th Judicial District in 2002, she was only the third woman to hold that position.

== Judicial law clerk ==
In 1982–1983, Karalunas was a judicial law clerk for Judge Howard G. Munson of the United States District Court for the Northern District of New York.

== Private Legal Practice ==
Karalunas was in private legal practice in Syracuse from 1983 to 2002, at the law firm of Bond, Schoeneck & King, where she became a law partner in that firm.

== Education ==
Karalunas received a Bachelor of Arts degree from Cornell University in 1978, and her Juris Doctor degree, cum laude, from Syracuse University College of Law in 1982.

== Author and educator ==
She has served as an adjunct professor at the Syracuse University School of Law, where she teaches New York Civil Practice. She is on the faculty of the New York State Bar Association's Young Lawyers Trial Academy.

She has been a chapter author in the legal treatise, Commercial Litigation in New York State Courts.

== Honors and awards ==
Among other honors and awards, Karalunas has received the following;

- New York State Bar Association's Advancement of Judicial Diversity Award (2024).
- Association of Justices of the Supreme Court of the State of New York's Justice Martin J. Evans Award for Judicial Excellence and Leadership (2022)
- Public Service Honoree of the Armenian Bar Association (2018)
- Inaugural Karen DeCrow Award from the Central New York Women's Bar Association, which honors those advancing the principle that civil rights are human rights that should be extended to all (2017)
- Syracuse University College of Law Distinguished Alumni Achievement Award (2019)

== Positions ==
Karalunas has held the following positions, among others;

- President of the Association of Justices of the Supreme Court of the State of New York
- Chair, 5th Judicial District Women in the Courts Committee
- President, Board of Directors for the Central New York Women's Bar Association
- Member, New York State Committee on Pattern Jury Instructions
