= Allan van Gestel =

American judge in Massachusetts

Judge, Superior Court of Suffolk County, Massachusetts
- In office 1996–2007
- Appointed by: Governor William F. Weld

Personal details
- Born: 1935 (age 90–91) Boston, Massachusetts
- Education: Colby College (1957); Boston University School of Law (1961)

Allan van Gestel is a retired American judge, who served as an associate justice of the Superior Court of Suffolk County, Massachusetts, located in Boston. He was that court's first specialist business court judge, and has been described as the father of its Business Litigation Session.

== Judicial service ==
In 1996, Governor William F. Weld appointed Allan van Gestel as a judge to the Superior Court of Suffolk County, located in Boston, Massachusetts. In 2005, van Gestel reached the mandatory retirement age of 70, but was recalled and continued serving on that court through 2007.

In October 2000, van Gestel became the first judge in the Suffolk Superior Court's Business Litigation Session (BLS), a specialized business court docket in the Superior Court. He was the sole BLS judge until 2002, and issued numerous legal opinions, at least some of which were without the assistance of law clerks. In the BLS's early year, van Gestel was known for the speedy resolution of disputes, an informal but intensive approach to case management, and regularly issuing legal opinions addressing important matters of business law. During his time on the BLS, van Gestel issued over 250 opinions. van Gestel's "decisions have helped shape the law in Massachusetts concerning business disputes". He has been described as integral to the BLS's establishment and viability, and the father of the BLS. He participated in the first meeting of the American College of Business Court Judges in 2005.

== Legal practice ==
From 1961 to 1996, van Gestel was a lawyer in private practice with the law firm of Goodwin, Procter & Hoar. In the 1980s, he was involved with notable litigation concerning Native American land claims in upstate New York.

== Education ==
van Gestel received his undergraduate degree from Colby College in 1957, and his law degree from Boston University School of Law in 1961.

As an educator, van Gestel has served on the faculty of the National Institute for Trial Advocacy, and as an instructor at the Boston University School of Law and Harvard Law School.

== Awards and positions held ==
In 2015, van Gestel received the American College of Trial Lawyers Samuel E. Gates Litigation Award. In 2006, van Gestel received the Haskell Cohn Award for Distinguished Justice from the Boston Bar Association. In 2003, he received the Judicial Excellence Award from the Massachusetts Lawyers Weekly.

He is a Fellow of the American College of Trial Lawyers, and was Chairman of the Massachusetts Supreme Judicial Court Standing Advisory Committee on the Rules of Civil Procedure from 1986 to 1993.

He is a Trustee of Colby College, and received its Distinguished Alumnus Award in 2002.
