= Elizabeth Gonzalez =

Judge of the Nevada's Eighth Judicial District Court

Judge, Eighth Judicial District Court, Clark County, Nevada
- In office 2004 – 2021
- Appointed by: Governor Kenny Guinn

Chief Judge, Eighth Judicial District Court, 2017-2018

Personal details
- Education: University of Florida (B.A., with honors, 1982); University of Florida School of Law (J.D. 1985)

Elizabeth Goff Gonzalez is a retired American judge who served on Nevada's Eighth Judicial District Court, a state level trial court located in Las Vegas, Clark County, Nevada. She was a presiding judge in the civil division and served two years as chief judge. She is a nationally recognized business court judge, having served in the Las Vegas Business Court for over a decade, and as President of the American College of Business Court Judges. She has a long history of involvement with access to justice and pro bono legal services, and has received a number of honors for this work.

== Judicial service ==
In 2004, Nevada Governor Kenny Guinn appointed Gonzalez to the Clark County District Court. She served as the presiding judge of the civil division from 2004 to 2016, and succeeded David Barker as that district's Chief Judge from 2017 to 2018, after being voted chief judge by the other judges on the court. She retired from the court in September 2021.

The Eighth Judicial District Court includes a specialized business court track, known as the Business Court. In 2007, Gonzales was selected to preside in the Business Court, where she served for over a decade, conducting numerous jury and bench trials involving complex civil and business disputes. During her tenure, she also conducted over 350 settlement conferences. Nationally, she has served as President of the American College of Business Court Judges, and as a Business Court Representative to the American Bar Association's Business Law Section.

Among notable high-profile cases, she was the judge in: a wrongful termination action brought against prominent businessman Sheldon Adelson, a suit by Icelandic drug manufacturer, Alvogen, Inc., to halt use of its drugs in the execution of Scott Dozier, real estate magnate and casino mogul Steve Wynn's efforts to block release of a Massachusetts Gaming Commission report, and an "epic lawsuit" addressing the state taxing authority's powers over marijuana licensing in Nevada, sometimes referred to as "World War Weed."

== Legal practice ==
Gonzalez was admitted to the State Bar of Nevada in 1985. From 1985 to 1986, Gonzalez was a judicial law clerk to Judge Donald M. Mosley, in the Clark County District Court. She worked with the Las Vegas law firm Beckley, Singleton, Jemison & List from 1986 to 1998, focusing on complex civil litigation such as business, mass tort, and construction defect litigation. From 1997 to 1998, she was that firm's president. From 1998 until becoming a judge in 2004, Gonzalez operated her own law firm.

She first came to prominence as an attorney as defense counsel in connection with the 1988 Pepcon disaster.

After retiring as a judge, Gonzalez joined the private alternative dispute resolution provider, Advanced Resolution Management.

== Education ==
In 1982, Gonzalez received a B.A. in History, with honors, from the University of Florida, and in 1985, she received her Juris Doctor degree from the University of Florida College of Law.

== Awards and honors ==
Gonzales has a long history of working to enhance pro bono legal services and providing access to justice for all members of the community. She has received the following awards and honors, among others;

- Clark County Law Foundation's and City of Las Vegas' Liberty Bell Award in connection with establishing the Civil Law Self-Help Center (2015)
- Justice Nancy Becker Award of Judicial Excellence from the Legal Aid Center of Southern Nevada Pro Bono Project (2012)
- Justice Nancy Becker Pro Bono Award of Judicial Excellence from the Clark County Pro Bono Project (2007)
- Trial Peers Program Judge of the Year (2007, 2010). “The Trial by Peers Program is a partnership of the judiciary, the juvenile justice system, and the Clark County Bar Association diverting certain youthful offenders from the juvenile court system”.
- State Bar of Nevada's Access to Justice Commission recognized her for operating the Small Firm of the Year (2003)
- State Bar of Nevada's Access to Justice Committee selected Gonzales as Attorney of the Year (2002)

== Positions ==
Gonzalez has held numerous positions in legal and service organizations, including, among others;

- President, American College of Business Court Judges (2014 to 2015)
- Business Court Representative to the American Bar Association's Business Law Section
- President, Board of Directors of Clark County Legal Services
- President, Nevada District Judges Association.
- Regional Chair, State Bar of Nevada Fee Dispute Committee.
