= Ira Gammerman =

American judge (1927–2019)

Justice, New York Supreme Court, Manhattan
- In office 1983–2004

Judicial Hearing Office, New York Supreme Court, Manhattan
- In office 2004-2018

Judge, New York City Civil Court
- In office 1979–1983

Personal details
- Born: July 30, 1927 New York City, US
- Died: January 26, 2019 (aged 91) New York City, US
- Education: Columbia College (1947); Columbia Law School (J.D. 1950)

Ira Gammerman (July 30, 1927 - January 26, 2019) was an American judge who served as a trial division judge on the New York Supreme Court in Manhattan for over 20 years, and then for another 14 years as a Judicial Hearing Officer after his judicial retirement. He was one of the first specialized business court judges in New York City and the United States. He oversaw thousands of cases, including numerous high-profile cases.

== Judicial service ==
Gammerman was first elected in 1979 as a judge to the New York City Civil Court where he served until 1983. In June 1983, he was appointed as a justice of the New York Supreme Court in Manhattan, and was elected to that position later in 1983.

In 1993, Administrative Judge Stanley S. Ostrau established pilot Commercial Parts in the New York County (Manhattan) Supreme Court. This was a specialized business court program with a jurisdiction focused on disputes of a business and commercial nature. The original four judges assigned to this pilot business court were Gammerman, Myriam Altman, Herman Cahn, and Beatrice Shainswit, with Walter M. Schackman replacing Altman in 1994. Gammerman began actively handling pilot part cases as a business court judge on January 4, 1993.

Two years later, New York Chief Judge Judith S. Kaye established a Commercial Division within the Supreme Court. The new Commercial Division was first established in Manhattan's Supreme Court, and in the 7th Judicial District (Rochester, Monroe County) Supreme Court. Like the pilot commercial parts, the new Commercial Division had a specialized jurisdiction focusing on complex business and commercial disputes, with one specialist business court judge overseeing a case from beginning to end. As to judges selected to the Commercial Division, "[t]he caseload of the Division is ... very demanding, requiring of the court scholarship in commercial law, experience in the management of complex cases, and a wealth of energy."

In 1995, the four commercial pilot part judges (including Gammerman), plus Justice Stephen G. Crane, became the first five justices assigned to the new Manhattan Commercial Division. Gammerman continued to serve in the Commercial Division until his mandatory judicial retirement in 2004 at age 76, altogether serving over ten years as a business court judge.

Gammerman continued to serve on the Supreme Court and the Commercial Division beyond judicial retirement, in the role of Judicial Hearing Officer (JHO). A person has to have been a judge or justice to be accepted as a JHO under New York law. Further, even if accepted by the court as a JHO, an individual can only serve as a JHO in a specific case if all parties consent, meaning that parties would now be choosing Gammerman to oversee or rule in their cases.

As a JHO, Gammerman could be called upon to make the same kinds of decisions he would make as a judge. He continued carrying a significant volume of cases in the Commercial Division, while also presiding over some non-commercial matters in the Supreme Court's general assignment part. Gammerman was still serving as a JHO until his 2018 retirement, less than a year before his death in January 2019.

As a judge and JHO, he was known for his industriousness, decisiveness, alacrity, wit, and intelligence. Gammerman served on the Association of Justices of the Supreme Court of the State of New York's Pattern Jury Instructions Committee for 25 years, being described by Justice Helen Freedman as a "dominating force" on that committee. He also was a member of Chief Judge Judith Kaye's jury selection reform project.

== Noteworthy cases ==
Gammerman heard thousands of cases in his career as a judge and JHO. He oversaw or decided a considerable number of high-profile lawsuits in the New York Supreme Court, including the following, among others;

- a wrongful death suit by Andy Warhol's estate against New York Hospital (1991)
- A DES (diethylstilbestrol) lawsuit against pharmaceutical companies brought by 11 women whose mothers had taken that drug during pregnancy, to the detriment of daughters born to them (1994)
- a suit by The Ronettes against American Express and ad agency Ogilvy and Mather over use of the song Be My Baby (1995)
- a suit between actress Joan Collins and the publisher Random House Books (1996)
- a financial dispute between Leona Helmsley and Peter L. Malkin concerning control of the Empire State Building (1997)
- class action lawsuits against software maker Intuit based on Year 2000 concerns over potential catastrophic software failures (1998)
- a suit over royalty payments allegedly due from recordings made by Jimi Hendrix
- a dispute over the city's effort to avoid strict zoning limits on residential developments in Manhattan's SoHo neighborhood that only allowed for housing "artists-in-residence" (1999)
- a suit by then New York Attorney General Dennis Vacco against the Apollo Theater Foundation, whose board was headed by Congressman Charles B. Rangel, to put the famed Apollo Theater into receivership (1999), in which Gammerman allowed Percy Sutton to intervene
- a suit involving investment bank Salomon Smith Barney's right to advise North Fork Bancorp on a $1.88 billion hostile takeover bid for Dime Bancorp (2000)
- a suit by American composer and lyricist Stephen Sondheim and writer John Weidman against producer Scott Rudin over the production of a play
- a dispute over insurance coverage between AXA Reassurance and Chase Manhattan Bank in connection with losses on the 2000 movie, The Crew
- filmmaker Woody Allen's lawsuit against film producer Jean Doumanian for money allegedly owed from a number of movies they made together (2002)
- a dispute over the disposition of $417.5 million raised in stock sales by WellChoice, the holding company for insurance company Empire Blue Cross and Blue Shield, in the context of converting from a non-profit to a for-profit entity (2002)
- a suit brought by Fox News when its news anchor Paula Zahn moved to CNN (2002)
- a civil case in which Gammerman recused himself after learning one of the parties, real estate developer Abraham Hirschfeld, had allegedly sought to have Gammerman killed by a hitman (2002)
- a suit between comedian and actress Rosie O'Donnell and her publishing partner over the failed Rosie magazine (2003)
- a constitutional challenge to the charter of the Greek Orthodox Church (2004)
- a dispute over disposition of a restaurant developed for the reality television series The Restaurant (2004)
- a suit by investor Jean-Pierre Lehmann against The Project over access/purchase rights to the artwork of Julie Mehretu (2005)
- a suit by then New York State Attorney General Eliot Spitzer against Entercom Communications for alleged pay-to-play radio practices (2006)
- a breach of contract dispute between radio and television personality Howard Stern and the broadcast network CBS (2006)
- a suit between the Milstein real estate family and Prince Faisal ibn Khalid of Saudi Arabia and Pakistan Airlines Investments concerning financial obligations around the famous Roosevelt Hotel in New York (2006)
- a lawsuit by news host, reporter, and anchor Dan Rather against the CBS network (2009)
- a suit brought by Prince Jefri Bolkiah of Brunei (a brother of the Sultan of Brunei) against his former lawyers (2010)

== Legal practice ==
Gammerman was admitted to law practice in New York in 1950. As a lawyer in private practice, he practiced labor law in representing trade unions, and he tried personal injury cases.

== Education ==
Gammerman received his undergraduate degree from Columbia College in 1947, and his Juris Doctor degree from Columbia Law School in 1950.

== Positions and honors ==
Gammerman held the following positions or received the following honors, among others:

- Pattern Jury Instructions Committee, Association of Justices of the Supreme Court of the State of New York
- Member, Chief Judge's jury selection reform project
- Jurist of the Year, Metropolitan Black Bar Association (2005)
- Louis J. Capazzoli Gavel Award, New York County Lawyers Association (2004)
