= Joseph R. Slights III =

American judge (born 1963)

Vice Chancellor, Delaware Court of Chancery
- In office 2016–2022
- Appointed by: Governor Jack Markell
- Preceded by: John Noble
- Succeeded by: Nathan Cook

Judge, Superior Court of Delaware
- In office 2000–2012
- Appointed by: Governor Tom Carper
- Preceded by: William T. Quillen

Personal details
- Born: September 4, 1963 (age 62) Dover, Delaware
- Education: James Madison University (B.S. 1985), Washington and Lee School of Law (J.D. 1988)

Joseph R. Slights III is a lawyer and retired American judge who served on the Delaware Court of Chancery from 2016 to 2022, and the Superior Court of Delaware from 2000 to 2012, playing an instrumental role in creating that court's Complex Commercial Litigation Division.

== Judicial service ==
Slights served as both a judge in Delaware's Superior Court and a vice chancellor in the Delaware Court of Chancery. The Superior Court is the state's trial level court with general jurisdiction over criminal cases and civil cases involving money damages. The Chancery court is a court of equity, and has been recognized as the pre-eminent United States court addressing corporation law. Slights has served as a judge or vice chancellor in hundreds of cases, and issued hundreds of written decisions and legal opinions.

=== Superior Court and Complex Commercial Litigation Division ===
In 2000, Delaware Governor Tom Carper appointed Slights to Delaware's Superior Court. He succeeded Judge William T. Quillen. Slights retired from the Superior Court in 2012. As a Superior Court judge, Slights presided over a wide range of case types, for example, first degree murder, patent licensing, medical malpractice, claims against pharmaceutical companies, asbestos litigation, and insurance coverage.

While serving on the Superior Court, Slights was instrumental in developing that court's Complex Commercial Litigation Division (CCLD). The CCLD is a specialized business court program that was created in May 2010, with a jurisdiction focused on complex civil commercial disputes. The CCLD was created as a complement to Delaware's Court of Chancery. It was designed "to offer businesses a forum dedicated to the resolution of business disputes" involving money damages. It has a designated subset of Superior Court judges, who hear assigned cases from beginning to end, using an active but flexible case management approach. Slights sat as one of the first CCLD judges, until his 2012 retirement.

As a CCLD judge, Slights presided over commercial disputes, among others, concerning: a dispute between two parties to a real estate development agreement, a dispute over royalty payments on medical device sales, an insurance coverage dispute between primary and excess insurance companies, a breach of a supply agreement for goods between two businesses, a dispute over the right to liquidate preferred stock, and a novel case of tortious interference with contractual relations.

Nationally, Slights is a charter member of the American College of Business Court Judges, participated in its first meeting, and served as one of its directors. Among other national presentations, he was involved in co-presenting a program on business courts at Vanderbilt University Law School with Davidson County, Tennessee Chancellor Anne C. Martin. Slights has written on the role and history of both the Chancery and Superior Courts as business courts.

=== Chancery Court ===
In 2016, Delaware Governor Jack Markell appointed Slights to the Delaware Court of Chancery as a vice chancellor, and Slights was unanimously confirmed by the Delaware Senate. He served as a vice chancellor until his retirement in early 2022. Slights issued approximately 250 written decisions during his time as vice chancellor, and presided over many notable and significant cases. In 2021 alone, he issued over 50 written decisions as a vice chancellor.

=== Notable cases in Chancery court ===
Slights has presided over many notable cases, including, among others;

- In re Facebook, Inc. Derivative Litigation
- Deborah Pettry, derivatively on behalf of FedEx Corporation v. Frederick W. Smith, et al.
- McDonald's Corporation v. Stephen J. Easterbrook
- In re Viacom, Inc. Stockholders Litigation
- In re Tesla Motors, Inc. Stockholder Litigation
- Richard J. Tornetta, Individually and on Behalf of All Others Similarly Situated and Derivative on Behalf of Nominal Defendant Tesla, Inc. v. Elon Musk, et al.
- Bucks County Employees Retirement Fund v. CBS Corp.
- In re Clovis Oncology Inc. Derivative Litigation
- Hoeller v. Tempur Sealy
- In re Martha Stewart Living Omnimedia Inc. Stockholder Litigation
- In re Appraisal of Rouse Properties, Inc.
- In Re: GR BURGR, LLC v. Rowen Seibel (involving celebrity chef Gordon Ramsay)

== Legal practice ==
Before his appointment to the Superior Court, Slights practiced law with the Wilmington, Delaware law firms, Sidney Balick P.A., and Richards Layton & Finger. From 2012 to 2016, between serving as a judge on the Superior Court and vice-chancellor of the Chancery Court, Slights was a corporate and business litigator at the Wilmington law firm Morris James. After leaving the Chancery Court, in August 2022, Slights joined the international law firm Wilson Sonsini.

Slights has written on alternative dispute resolution (ADR). He has been, and is, a provider of ADR services, such as arbitration and mediation.

== Education and as a legal educator ==
Slights received a Bachelor of Science degree from James Madison University in 1985, and his Juris Doctor degree from Washington and Lee University School of Law in 1988.

Slights is an adjunct professor at Vanderbilt University Law School, and the Widener University School of Law. He is a Distinguished Professor of Judicial Studies at Washington and Lee University School of Law.

== Positions and memberships ==
Slights has held the following positions or memberships, among others;

- Chairman, Delaware Supreme Court Judicial Ethics Advisory Committee (2004–2008)
- Member, State-Federal Multijurisdiction Litigation Working Group, National Center for State Courts Judicial Panel on Multidistrict Litigation and the Federal Judicial Center
- Delaware State Bar Association: Chair, Health Law Section; and judicial member of Executive Committee
- Member, American Judicature Society National Advisory Council, Carpenter Jury Center Advisory Committee, and Editorial Committee
- Member, Advisory Board, Georgetown University Law Center's e-Discovery Institute
- Charter member and director, American College of Business Court Judges
- Elected member, American Law Institute
- Fellow, American Bar Foundation
- President, Richard S. Rodney Inn of Court

== Awards and honors ==
Slights has received the following awards, among others;

- Featured lecturer, The Eighteenth Annual Albert A. DeStefano Lecture on Corporate, Securities, & Financial Law at the Fordham Corporate Law Center
- Chief Justice's Citation for Judicial Independence and Excellence (2008)
- Distinguished Mentoring Award, Delaware State Bar Association (2006)
- Daniel L. Herrmann Professional Conduct Award, Delaware State Bar Association (2012)
