= Mary Miller Johnston =

American judge

Judge, Superior Court of Delaware
- In office 2003–2024
- Appointed by: Governor Ruth Ann Minner (2003)
- Preceded by: Haile L. Alford
- Appointed by: Governor Jack Markell (Reappointed in 2015)

Personal details
- Education: Wittenberg University (B.A., magna cum laude, 1979); Northwestern University (Masters in Music 1980); Washington & Lee School of Law (J.D., cum laude, 1984)

Mary Miller Johnston is an American judge who served over 20 years on the Superior Court of Delaware. In 2011, she was assigned to the Superior Court's Complex Commercial Litigation Division, a specialized business court program, where she served until retiring in 2024, and has been a leader nationally among business court judges. She issued hundreds of legal opinions during her career.

== Judicial service ==
"Unlike many jurisdictions, the members of Delaware’s judiciary are appointed after a meticulous judicial selection process." In 2003, Johnston was nominated by Governor Ruth Ann Minner as a judge to Delaware's Superior Court, and began serving on September 25, 2003. The Superior Court is the state's trial level court with jurisdiction over criminal cases and civil cases involving money damages. She was appointed to fill the judicial seat of the late Judge Haile L. Alford. In 2015, she was re-nominated by Governor Jack Markell for another 12-year term, and continued serving on the Superior Court until her retirement in early 2024.

The Delaware Superior Court's Complex Commercial Litigation Division (CCLD) is a specialized business court program that was created in May 2010, with a jurisdiction focused on complex civil commercial disputes. The CCLD was created as a complement to Delaware's Court of Chancery, a court of equity that primarily addresses non-monetary disputes and which is considered a preeminent business court. The CCLD was designed "to offer businesses a forum dedicated to the resolution of business disputes" involving money damages. It has a designated subset of Superior Court judges, who hear assigned cases from beginning to end, using an active but flexible case management approach.

Effective May 1, 2011, then Superior Court President Judge James T. Vaughn Jr. assigned Johnston to the CCLD. She served on the CCLD until her retirement in 2024, making her the longest serving judge in the CCLD's history. After her May 2011 appointment, she rendered her first CCLD written legal opinion on March 28, 2012, and made her final CCLD order on March 26, 2024. Johnston issued well over 150 written legal opinions and orders as a CCLD business court judge. Johnston has also been designated to sit as a vice chancellor in the Delaware Court of Chancery.

Johnston has been a national leader among business court judges. She is an officer of the American College of Business Court Judges. She has served as a Business Court Representative to the American Bar Association's Business Law Section.

Johnston continued to preside over other types of civil cases, as well as criminal cases, even after appointment to the CCLD. In addition to her CCLD opinions, she issued hundreds of non-CCLD civil and criminal case legal opinions during her 21 years on the court. By way of just a few examples, she has ruled on matters as wide-ranging as corporate directors and officers liability insurance coverage, contract disputes over development and marketing of medical devices involving millions of dollars, toxic tort pelvic mesh suits, homicides, and climate fossil fuel disputes.

== Legal practice ==
Prior to becoming a judge, Johnston was Chief Counsel of the Delaware Supreme Court's Office of Disciplinary Counsel, prosecuting cases involving attorney discipline and the unauthorized practice of law. She also was a law partner in private practice as a lawyer with the Wilmington, Delaware law firm Morris James, LLP, focusing on corporate and commercial litigation.

After retirement as a judge, Johnston joined the private alternative dispute resolution firm, Delaware ADR.

== Education ==
Johnston received her Bachelor of Arts in music, magna cum laude, from Wittenberg University in 1979, a Master of Music degree from Northwestern University in 1980, and a Juris Doctor degree, cum laude, from Washington & Lee School of Law in 1984.

== Honors and positions ==
Johnston has received the following awards and honors, and held the following positions, among others;

- Received the Delaware State Bar Association's Women's Leadership Award (2007)
- Chair, Delaware State Bar Association's Women and the Law Section
- Secretary and Treasurer, American College of Business Court Judges
- Business Court Representative, American Bar Association's Business Law Section.
- Member, Delaware Supreme Court's Permanent Advisory Committee on the Delaware Lawyers' Rules of Professional Conduct
- Member, Supreme Court of Delaware's Professionalism Committee
- Member, Washington & Lee School of Law Council
- Member, Board of Governors of Wesley Theological Seminary
- President, Board of Children & Families First
- Graduated magna cum laude from Wittenburg University and cum laude from Washington & Lee School of Law
- Lead Article's Editor of the Law Review, Washington & Lee University School of Law
