= Elizabeth Hazlitt Emerson =

American judge

Justice, New York Supreme Court, Nassau County, New York (elected twice, 1995 and 2009)
- In office 1996–2023

Personal details
- Education: Boston College (A.B., magna cum laude, 1979); Syracuse University College of Law (J.D., magna cum laude, 1982)

Elizabeth Hazlitt Emerson is a retired American judge who served on the New York Supreme Court of Suffolk County for 28 years, 21 of those years presiding in that court's Commercial Division, a specialized business court. She was instrumental in establishing the Suffolk County Commercial Division, and has played an important part in developing New York's Commercial Division statewide. She worked at prestigious New York law firms before being elected to the bench for two 14-year terms, and has been recognized and honored for her work as a judge and judicial administrator.

== Judicial service ==
In 1995, Emerson was elected to the trial level New York Supreme Court of Suffolk County for a 14-year term, and was reelected to a second term in 2009. She served as a judge from 1996 until her retirement in 2023.

Emerson served in the court's general civil part (four years) and dedicated matrimonial part (two years) from 1996 to 2002. In 2002, she assisted in establishing a Commercial Division in the Suffolk County Supreme Court. The Commercial Division is a specialized business court docket within New York's Supreme Court, with a jurisdiction limited to disputes of a business and commercial nature. Commercial Division judges preside over an assigned case from beginning to end. "The caseload of the Division is ... very demanding, requiring of the court scholarship in commercial law, experience in the management of complex cases, and a wealth of energy."

Emerson became the first Suffolk County Commercial Division judge in 2002, and remained in that position until her retirement in 2023. In developing the Suffolk County Commercial Division, she designed its original rules and protocols, and created forms and model language for the new business court. She also founded and co-chaired the Commercial Division Committee of the Suffolk County Bar Association. During her tenure as a Commercial Division judge, Emerson issued over 300 written legal opinions.

Statewide in New York, she has been involved in crafting uniform Commercial Division rules and procedures, while serving as an appointee on the Commercial Division Advisory Council. She also was a member of the Chief Judge of New York's Task Force on Commercial Litigation in the 21st Century. Nationally, Emerson served as a Business Court Representative to the American Bar Association's Business Law Section. She has also presented at the American College of Business Court Judges, of which she is a member, on the "Formation and Administration of Business Courts."

From 2019 to 2023, Emerson also served as an Associate Justice of the Appellate Term for the 9th and 10th Judicial Districts in New York.

== Legal practice ==
Before becoming a judge, Emerson was in the private practice of law at two prestigious New York law firms. She began her legal career as an associate attorney at White & Case, where she worked from 1982 to 1984. She subsequently joined Shearman & Sterling, where she worked from 1984 to 1995, becoming a partner in 1992. Her areas of legal practice as a lawyer included, for example, representing Fortune 100 companies, U.S. and foreign banks, and investment banks; transactional corporate work; securities litigation; general commercial litigation; and handling complex cases.

After retiring as a judge, Emerson has joined Federal Arbitration (FedArb), a private alternative dispute resolution service.

== Education and as educator ==
Emerson received her A.B. degree from Boston College, magna cum laude in 1979, and her Juris Doctor degree from Syracuse University College of Law, magna cum laude, in 1982.

She has been an adjunct professor in the State University at Stony Brook's Masters in Business Administration program, while over the years also teaching or lecturing at Fordham University School of Law, St. John's University School of Law, and Dowling College.

== Author ==
Since 2004, she has authored the chapter on Secured Transactions in the highly regarded treatise Commercial Litigation in the New York State Courts (Robert L. Haig editor).

== Public service ==
From 1997 to 2002, Emerson designed, implemented and administered "Project Assist," which provided information about essential services to the public, connecting those in need to sources covering basic necessities of life such as "food, shelter, medical care, and relief from domestic violence...."

== Honors and awards ==
Emerson has received the following honors and awards, among others;

- Suffolk County Bar Association Award of Excellence, "for many years of service in administration of justice and to the ideals of the legal profession" (2023)
- St. Thomas Moore Award from the Catholic Lawyers Guild of Nassau (2022)
- New York County Lawyers Association's Conspicuous Service Award in connection with her writings on secured transactions in the Commercial Litigation in the New York State Courts treatise (2021)
- Maurice A. Deane School of Law at Hofstra University's Outstanding Women in Law Judicial Excellence award (2018)
- Boris Kostelanetz President's Medal from the New York County Lawyers Association, as one of the authors of the Commercial Litigation in the New York State Courts treatise (2013)
- Suffolk County Bar Association's Distinguished Service Award (2001)
- The Office of the County Executive's Excellence in Law award, and the Town of Brookhaven's Woman of the Year for Recognition of Contributions to Law (1996)
- Magna cum laude graduate of both Boston College (1979) and Syracuse University College of Law (1982)

== Memberships and positions ==
Emerson has held the following positions, among others;

- Emerson served as a Business Court Representative to the American Bar Association's Business Law Section (2021 to 2023)
- Selected to represent New York State at the program “Judicial Leaders in Climate Science” at the National Judicial College (2022)
- Member, Chief Judge of New York's Task Force on Commercial Litigation in the 21st Century
- Member, New York's Commercial Division Advisory Council, created by Chief Judge Jonathan Lippman to advise on "an ongoing basis about all matters involving and surrounding the Commercial Division of the Supreme Court of the State of New York".
- Co-chair, Suffolk County Bar Association's Commercial Division Committee, of which she was also a founding member
- Executive committee member at large of the Commercial and Federal Litigation Section of the New York State Bar Association
