= New York Supreme Court =

Trial-level court in the state of New York

The Supreme Court of the State of New York is the superior court in the judiciary of New York. It is vested with unlimited civil and criminal jurisdiction, although in many counties outside New York City it acts primarily as a court of civil jurisdiction, with most criminal matters handled in county courts.

New York is the only state where supreme court is a trial court rather than a court of last resort (which in New York is the Court of Appeals). Also, although it is a trial court, the Supreme Court sits as a "single great tribunal of general state-wide jurisdiction, rather than an aggregation of separate courts sitting in the several counties or judicial districts of the state." The Supreme Court is established in each of New York's 62 counties.

A separate branch of the Supreme Court called the Appellate Division serves as the highest intermediate appellate court in New York.

== Jurisdiction ==
New York County Courthouse at 60 Centre Street, viewed from across Foley Square

Under the New York State Constitution, the New York State Supreme Court has unlimited jurisdiction in both civil and criminal cases, with the exception of certain monetary claims against the State of New York itself. In practice, the Supreme Court hears civil actions involving claims above a certain monetary amount (for example, $50,000 in New York City) that puts the claim beyond the jurisdiction of lower courts. Civil actions about lesser sums are heard by courts of limited jurisdiction, such as the New York City Civil Court, or the County Court, District Court, city courts, or justice courts (town and village courts) outside New York City.

The Supreme Court also hears civil cases involving claims for equitable relief, such as injunctions, specific performance, or rescission of a contract, as well as actions for a declaratory judgment. The Supreme Court also has exclusive jurisdiction of matrimonial actions, such as either contested or uncontested actions for a divorce or annulment. The court also has exclusive jurisdiction over "Article 78 proceedings" against a body or officer seeking to overturn an official determination on the grounds that it was arbitrary, capricious and unreasonable or contrary to law.

At English Common Law, the lord chancellor, not as a part of his equitable jurisdiction, but as the king's delegate to exercise the Crown's special jurisdiction, had responsibility for the custody and protection of infants and the mentally incapacitated. Upon the organization of the Supreme Court in New York the Legislature transferred so much of the law as formed a part of the king's prerogative to it. The Appellate Divisions of the Supreme Court are responsible for oversight of the related programs.

With respect to criminal cases, the Criminal Branch of Supreme Court tries felony cases in the five counties of New York City, whereas they are primarily heard by the County Court elsewhere. Misdemeanor cases, and arraignments in almost all cases, are handled by lower courts: the New York City Criminal Court; the District Court in Nassau County and the five western towns of Suffolk County; city courts; and justice courts.

== Structure ==
=== Judicial districts ===
Under the New York State Constitution and by state statute, as of 2025, the courts of New York, including Supreme Court, are divided into thirteen judicial districts, each representing specific counties:

- First: New York (Manhattan)
- Second: Kings (Brooklyn)
- Third: Albany, Columbia, Greene, Rensselaer, Schoharie, Sullivan, Ulster
- Fourth: Clinton, Essex, Franklin, Fulton, Hamilton, Montgomery, St. Lawrence, Saratoga, Schenectady, Warren, Washington
- Fifth: Herkimer, Jefferson, Lewis, Oneida, Onondaga, Oswego
- Sixth: Broome, Chemung, Chenango, Cortland, Delaware, Madison, Otsego, Schuyler, Tioga, Tompkins
- Seventh: Cayuga, Livingston, Monroe, Ontario, Seneca, Steuben, Wayne, Yates
- Eighth: Allegany, Cattaraugus, Chautauqua, Erie, Genesee, Niagara, Orleans, Wyoming
- Ninth: Dutchess, Orange, Putnam, Rockland, Westchester
- Tenth: Nassau, Suffolk
- Eleventh: Queens
- Twelfth: Bronx
- Thirteenth Richmond (Staten Island)

Once every ten years the State Legislature may increase or decrease the number of judicial districts or alter the composition of judicial districts. The 12th Judicial District was created in 1981. The 13th Judicial District was created in 2007.

=== Appellate Division ===
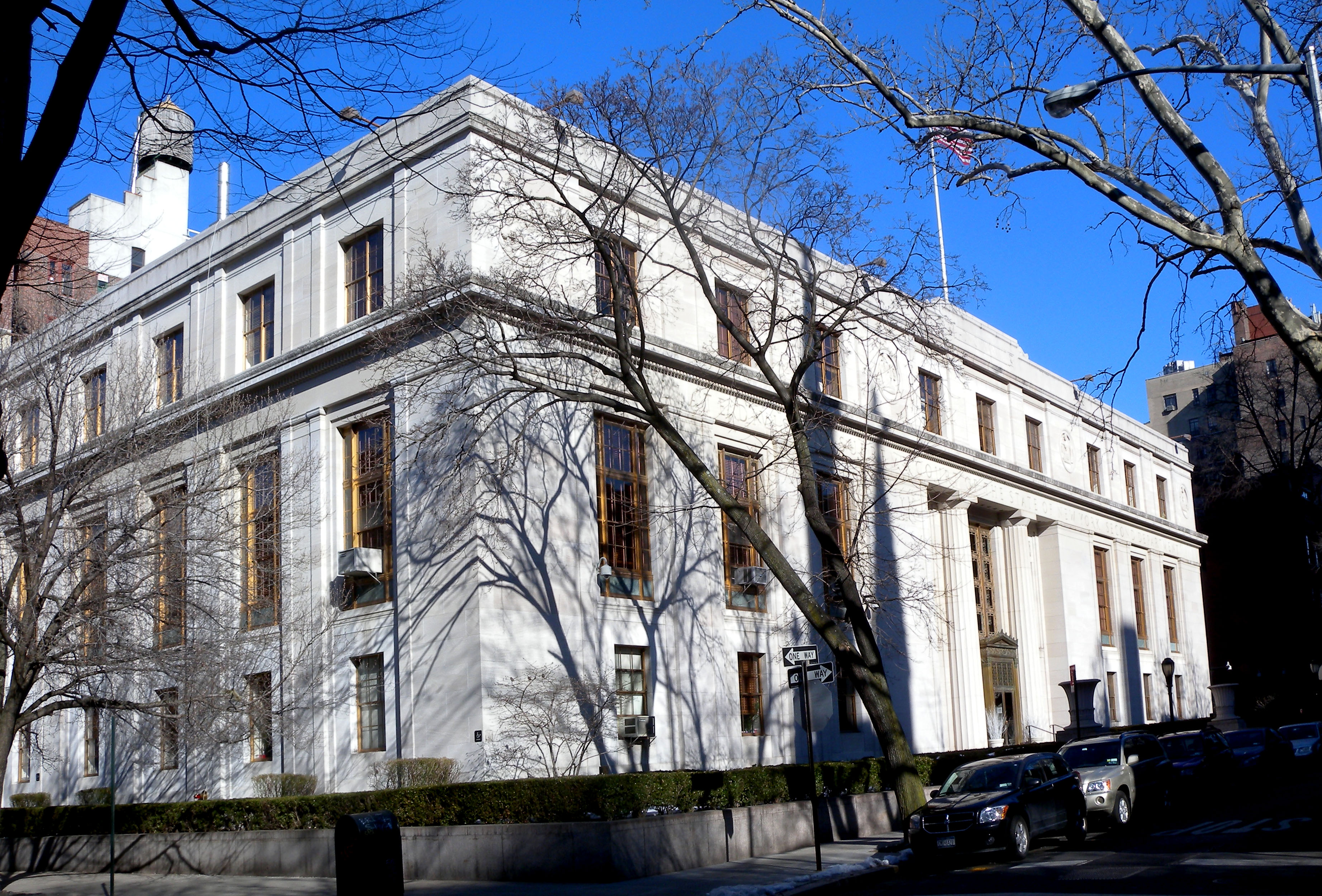
Second Department

Appeals from Supreme Court decisions, as well as from the Surrogate's Court, Family Court, and Court of Claims, are heard by the New York Supreme Court, Appellate Division. This court is intermediate between the New York Supreme Court and the New York Court of Appeals.

There is one Appellate Division, which for administrative purposes comprises four judicial departments.

The First Department consists of the 1st and 12th Judicial Districts. The Second Department consists of the 2nd, 9th, 10th 11th and 13th Judicial Districts. The Third Department consists of the 3rd, 4th and 6th Judicial Districts. The Fourth Department consists of the 5th, 7th and 8th Judicial Districts.

Decisions of the Appellate Division department panels are binding on the lower courts in that department, and also on lower courts in other departments unless there is contrary authority from the Appellate Division of that department.

=== Appellate terms ===
The Appellate Division of the Supreme Court in each judicial department is authorized to establish "appellate terms". An appellate term is an intermediate appellate court that hears appeals from the inferior courts within its designated counties or judicial districts, and are intended to ease the workload on the Appellate Division and provide a less expensive forum closer to the people.

There are three appellate terms located in the 1st and 2nd Judicial Departments only, representing Downstate New York. These hear appeals from city, district, and justice courts that would otherwise be heard by the county courts instead.

- The 1st Department has a single Appellate Term covering Manhattan and The Bronx. It hears appeals from the New York City Civil Court and New York City Criminal Court in those boroughs.
- The 2nd Department's Appellate Term for the 2nd, 11th and 13th Judicial Districts covers Brooklyn, Queens, and Staten Island, and generally sits at 141 Livingston Street in Brooklyn. It also hears appeals from the New York City Civil Court and New York City Criminal Court in those boroughs.
- The 2nd Department's Appellate Term for the 9th and 10th Judicial Districts covers Nassau, Suffolk, Westchester, Rockland, Orange, Dutchess, and Putnam Counties; it generally rotates between the Westchester County Courthouse in White Plains, the Nassau County Supreme Court Building in Mineola, and the Cohalan Court Complex in Central Islip, and occasionally sits at other locations within their jurisdiction. It hears appeals from the district courts in Nassau and western Suffolk Counties, the town and village justice courts throughout both counties, and the city courts of Glen Cove and Long Beach. It also hears appeals in civil matters from the county courts of both counties.

Appellate terms consist of between three and five justices of the Supreme Court, appointed by the chief administrative judge with the approval of presiding justice of the appropriate appellate division. The court sits in three-judge panels, with two justices constituting a quorum and being necessary for a decision. Decisions by the Appellate Term must be followed by courts whose appeals lie to it.

=== Commercial Division ===
In 1993, Administrative Judge Stanley S. Ostrau established pilot Commercial Parts in the New York County Supreme Court. Two years later, Chief Judge Judith S. Kaye established a trial level Commercial Division, beginning in New York County (Manhattan) and Monroe County (the 7th Judicial District). The Commercial Division has expanded to the 8th District (located in Buffalo), and the Albany, Bronx, Kings, Nassau, Onondaga, Queens, Suffolk and Westchester County Supreme Courts. These are specialized business courts, with a defined jurisdiction focusing on business and commercial litigation. The jurisdictional amount in controversy required to have a case heard in the Commercial Division varies among these Commercial Division courts, ranging from $50,000 in Albany and Onondaga Counties to $500,000 in New York County, but the Commercial Division rules (Section 202.70) are otherwise uniform.

The first specialist commercial judges assigned to the pilot Commercial Parts in 1993 were justices Ira Gammerman, Myriam Altman, Herman Cahn, and Beatrice Shainswit. Among other long serving Commercial Division justices, these judges served at least a decade: Justice Cahn continued on as a Commercial Division judge in Manhattan from 1995 until 2008, Justice Charles Ramos served as a Commercial Division judge in Manhattan from 1996–2018, Justice Elizabeth Hazlitt Emerson served in the Suffolk County Commercial Division from 2002–2023, Justice Carolyn E. Demarest served in the Brooklyn, Kings County Commercial Division from its inception in 2002 through 2016, Justice Deborah Karalunas presided in the Onondaga County (Syracuse) Commercial Division from its inception in 2007 for over 15 years, Justice Eileen Bransten served in the Manhattan Commercial Division from 2008 to 2018, Justice Timothy S. Driscoll has served in the Nassau County Commercial Division since 2009 (as of May 2024), and Justice Thomas A. Stander served in the Monroe County Commercial Division from its inception for ten years. One constant throughout the Commercial Division history has been the involvement of New York attorney Robert L. Haig, who, among other things, co-chaired the 1995 Commercial Courts Task Force, facilitated the 2006 Commercial Division Focus Group study, and has chaired the Commercial Division Advisory Council since 2013 (through at least May 2024).

=== Criminal and civil terms in New York City ===
In each borough of New York City, all felony cases are heard in Supreme Court criminal terms, while all major civil cases are heard in Supreme Court civil terms.

The Criminal Term of the Supreme Court, New York County is divided into 2 Trial Assignment parts, 10 conference and trial parts, 1 youth part, 1 narcotics/felony waiver part, 1 integrated domestic violence part, and 16 trial parts which include 1 Judicial Diversion part, 1 Mental Health part, 1 Veteran's Court part, and 1 JHO part.

== Administration ==
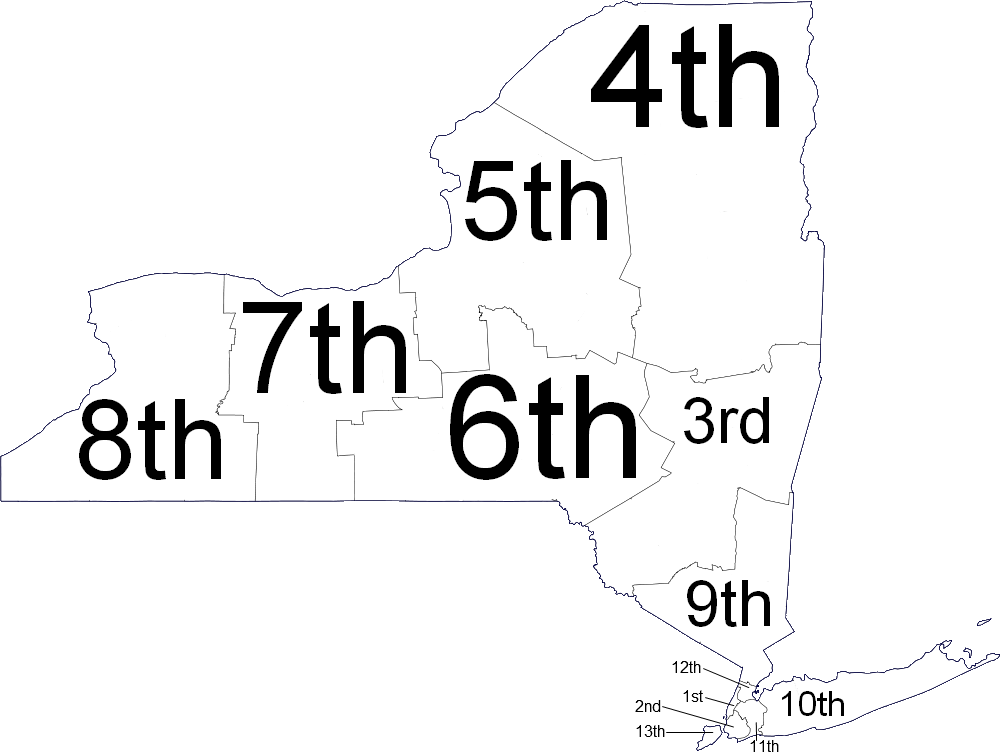
New York judicial districts as of 2012

As stated above, the court system is divided into thirteen judicial districts: seven upstate districts each comprising between five and eleven counties, five districts corresponding to the boroughs of New York City, and one district on Long Island. In each judicial district outside New York City, an administrator (or administrative judge if a judge) is responsible for supervising all courts and agencies, while inside New York City an administrator (or administrative judge) supervises each major court. Administrators are assisted by supervising judges who are responsible in the on-site management of the trial courts, including court caseloads, personnel, and budget administration, and each manage a particular type of court within a county or judicial district. The administrator is also assisted by the district executive and support staff. The district administrative offices are responsible for personnel, purchasing, budgets, revenue, computer automation, court interpreters, court security, and case management. Opinions of the New York trial courts are published selectively in the Miscellaneous Reports.

== Judges ==
A judge of the New York Supreme Court is titled a justice, and has been at least since the 1846 constitution.

=== Number of justices and assignments ===
The number of justices of the Supreme Court in each New York Supreme Court judicial district (including justices assigned to the Appellate Division) is set forth by the New York State Constitution. Once a decade, the state Legislature may increase the number of justices in any judicial district, but Article VI of the state Constitution sets a population-based cap on the number of justices in each district, based on census data. As a result of the population-based cap, some areas have overloaded courts. New York City has a cap of 171 justices (and only some of the New York Supreme Court justices in New York City serve in trial parts, with others assigned to the Appellate Division or the Appellate Term). As a result, New York City has too few judges to handle New York City's caseload, which is more than 100,000 cases annually; the population-based formula in the state Constitution does not account for the millions of non-resident workers and visitors in the city, nor the 315,000 business associations that operate in the city. Elected New York Supreme Court justices can be moved or temporarily reassigned anywhere in the state, although typically such moves or reassignments are within the judge's judicial district.

To address the imbalance, the New York court system designates other courts' judges (such as those sitting on the lower-level New York City Civil Court, New York City Criminal Court, and New York City Family Court, as well as the statewide New York Court of Claims) as "acting" Supreme Court justices to serve on the New York Supreme Court in New York City.

A similar practice is done in the 9th Judicial District (which covers the New York suburban counties of Orange, Dutchess, Westchester, Rockland and Putnam), in which County and Family Court judges have been designated as acting Supreme Court justices, serving part-time on that court. In some more rural counties outside of New York City, the County Court judge also functions as an acting Supreme Court Justice, Family Court judge and Surrogate. In these instances, the judge is referred to as a "multi-hat judge". However, this practice also strains the resources of the courts that "lend" justices to the Supreme Court.

=== Elections and terms ===
Supreme Court justices are elected to 14-year terms. Justices are nominated by judicial district nominating conventions, with judicial delegates themselves elected from assembly districts. Some (political party) county committees play a significant role in their judicial district conventions, for example restricting nomination to those candidates that receive approval from a party screening committee. Sometimes, the parties cross-endorse each other's candidates, while at other times they do not and incumbent judges must actively campaign for re-election. Judicial conventions have been criticized as opaque, brief and dominated by county party leaders. In practice, most of the power of selecting justices belongs to local political party organizations, such as the Kings County Democratic County Committee (Brooklyn Democratic Party), which control the delegates. The process was challenged in litigation which ultimately resulted in a U.S. Supreme Court decision in N.Y. State Board of Elections v. Lopez Torres (2008), in which the justices unanimously upheld the constitutionality of New York's judicial election system.

=== Mandatory retirement age ===
Under state law, New York Supreme Court justices have a mandatory retirement age: a justice's term ends, even if their 14-year term has not yet expired, at the end of the calendar year in which the justice reaches the age of 70. However, an elected Supreme Court Justice may apply for a "certification" from the Office of Court Administration (OCA) to continue in office, without having to be re-elected, for three two-year periods, until final retirement at the end of the year in which the Justice turns 76. A judge applying for certification to continue to serve must pass cognitive tests, but OCA is not required to grant certification even if judges are capable. In 2020, for example, OCA denied certification to 46 of the 49 judges who applied for it, citing budget cuts and a hiring freeze.

These additional six years of service are available only for elected Supreme Court justices, not for "acting" justices whose election or appointments were to lower courts.

A referendum to increase the retirement age to 80 for Supreme Court and Court of Appeals judges was defeated by New York voters in 2013.

=== Notable justices ===
- George Pierce Andrews
- George G. Barnard
- Richard J. Bartlett
- Benjamin N. Cardozo
- John Carro
- Richard J. Daronco
- Noah Davis
- Arthur Engoron
- Gerald Garson
- Jasper W. Gilbert
- James Kent
- Barry Kramer
- Irving Lehman
- Samuel Leibowitz
- Edmund H. Lewis
- Henry Brockholst Livingston
- Joseph Lorigo
- Jeremiah T. Mahoney
- Edward Everett McCall
- Juan Merchan
- Levinus Monson
- Lyman H. Smith
- Daniel D. Tompkins
- Sol Wachtler
- Robert F. Wagner
- Raymond Walter

== History ==
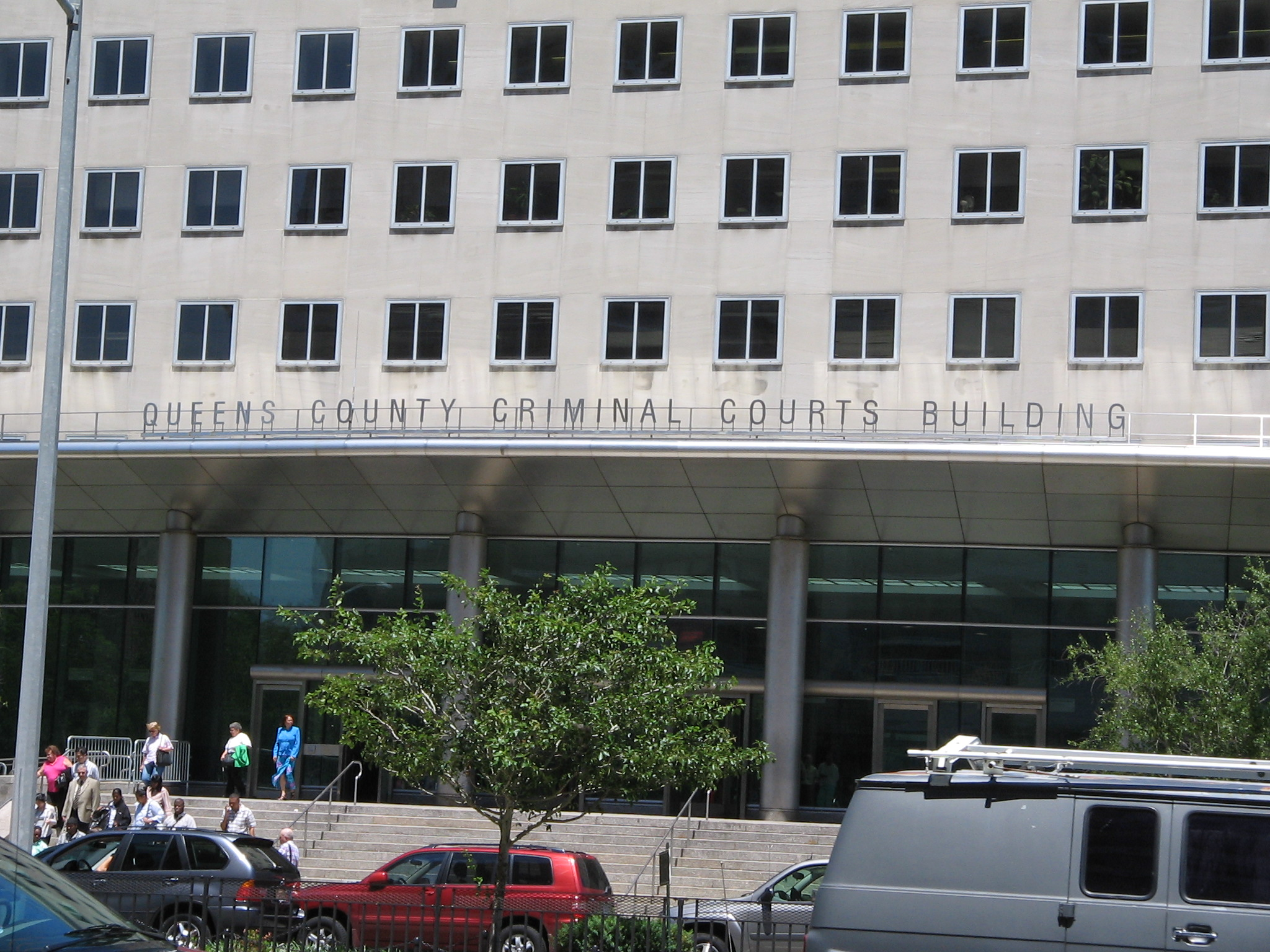
The Queens County Criminal Courts Building houses justices and courtrooms of the New York Supreme Court

The New York Supreme Court is the oldest Supreme Court with general original jurisdiction. It was established as the Supreme Court of Judicature by the Province of New York on May 6, 1691. That court was continued by the State of New York after independence was declared in 1776. It became the New York Supreme Court under the New York Constitutional Convention of 1846.

In November 2004, the court system merged the operations of two separate criminal courts—the Bronx County Criminal Court and the Criminal Term of Bronx County Supreme Court—into a single trial court of criminal jurisdiction known as the Bronx Criminal Division.

=== Origins ===
The Assembly of the Province (Colony) of New York established the "New York Supreme Court of Judicature" with the same common law jurisdiction as the English Courts of King’s Bench, Common Pleas and Exchequer.

The 1691 statute was entitled "An Act for the Establishing Courts of Judicature for the Ease and benefit of each respective City, Town and County within this Province." The preamble of the statute stated that "[t]he orderly Regulation and the establishment of Courts of Justice throughout this Province as well in the Respect of Time as place doth tend very much to the honor and Dignity of the Crowne as well as to the Ease and benefit of the Subject."

The 1691 statute stated that "there shall be held and kept a Supreame Court of Judicature, which shall be Duely & Constantly kept att the City of New Yorke and not Elsewhere, att the everall & Respective times hereafter mentioned. And that there be five Justices att Least appointed & Commissionated to hold the same Court, two whereof together with one Chief Justice to be a Quorum. Which Supreame Court are hereby full Impowered and Authorized to have Cognizance, of all pleas, Civill Criminall, and Mixt, as fully and amply to all Intents & purposes whatsoever, as the Court of Kings Bench, Common Pleas & Exchequer within their Majestyes Kingdome of England, have or ought to have." This original Supreme Court did not have the powers of a Court of Equity—that jurisdiction was vested in the New York Court of Chancery.

In the colonial era, the Chief Justice and the two associate judges (three after 1758) were appointed by the Royal Governor. The Supreme Court judges were both trial judges and appellate judges. Trials were held in New York City for very difficult civil cases and major criminal cases. The judges also traveled to the county seat of each county every few months to hold trials as a circuit court. Judgments from County court and courts of a local Justice of the peace could be appealed to Supreme Court. Supreme Court judgments could be appealed to the Royal Governor and his council. The court of last resort was the Privy Council in London, which could accept cases where the amount involved was over 300 English Pounds (roughly $100,000 USD in 2025); the amount increased to 500 pounds in 1753.

=== Post-independence ===
After the United States Declaration of Independence New York State enacted its first State Constitution in 1777. Supreme Court continued as a trial court of general jurisdiction and an appellate court for decisions of lesser courts. General terms of the full five member court were held in New York City and Albany, with a Utica term added in 1820 and a Rochester term added in 1841. Starting in 1805, Supreme Court commissioners were appointed in most counties to deal with routine non-trial legal issues. The 1822 New York constitution reduced Supreme Court to three justices but divided the state into eight judicial districts with an appointed circuit judge in charge of each.

Prior to the 1846 State constitution, the New York State judiciary was organized as much by tradition and practice as it was by statute and rules.

For the first 70 years of its life, from the time of the State's first Constitution in 1777, the New York Judiciary was a comparatively primitive institution, little changed—in form and operation—from the colonial court system erected in the 17th Century. Judges were few in number. All were appointed by a central authority and, because they rode circuit, sometimes sitting in individual locales only once every few months, they had no real constituency and only limited geographical identification. The Chancellor and justices of the Supreme Court served for no fixed term of office, and were subject only to mandatory retirement at age 60. In effect, each judge was himself an institution with substantial, if not really unlimited, authority to determine the rules of legal practice before his court. Also, each judge generally had the final word in controversies before him as there was little in the way of an appellate court structure.

— Marc Bloustein, A Short History of the New York State Court System, 1987,

=== 1846 and 1894 constitutional changes ===
The 1846 New York State constitution dramatically reorganized the judiciary and Supreme Court. Gone were the circuit judges and Supreme Court commissioners. Now all trial judges were "justices' of the Supreme Court, a minimum of 32. A 'general term' of panels of Supreme Court justices was the direct predecessor of the intermediate appellate organization now known as the Appellate Division. The Court of Appeals was formally established as the State's highest Court. Judges were appointed to fixed terms. And the Court of Chancery was abolished; Supreme Court became a court with jurisdiction over both law and equity.

New York's next constitution, in 1894, formally established the Appellate Division of Supreme Court and created the four appellate departments.

There have been significant changes in how the courts of the Judiciary of New York are administered, and many lower courts were consolidated in a constitutional amendment in 1961. The practices and procedures have also been modified and updated through the years (see Civil Practice Law and Rules). But the basic structure of Supreme Court, with trial justices elected by judicial districts, with four appellate departments for intermediate appeals and the Court of Appeals as the highest court in the state, remain unchanged from the 1847 and 1894 constitutions.
