= New York justice courts =

In the New York State Unified Court System, a justice court is a local court that handles traffic tickets, criminal matters, small claims, and local code violations such as zoning. Constitutionally, justice courts are part of the state legal system, but state law generally makes them independent of the New York State Office of Court Administration (OCA) and instead makes them the responsibility of their sponsoring localities.

== Structure ==
Town justice courts are often called town court, and village justice courts are often called village court. (City courts in New York state handle mostly the same types of cases but are not justice courts.)

== Operations ==
While justices and their court clerks receive training from OCA, there is tremendous variability in how cases are handled. This includes court procedures and substantive results. Some courts will dismiss a traffic ticket if the officer does not appear for a trial, while others will adjourn the matter to give the officer another chance. In some courts the police prosecute their own tickets, while in others an assistant district attorney from the county, or a town or village attorney, will prosecute the tickets. This may even vary by the type of officer, with state troopers and deputies prosecuting their tickets and a town attorney prosecuting tickets written by the town police.

Larger towns can have very busy caseloads, including several sessions a week with dozens of cases at each session, and people may have to wait hours before their cases are heard. In some small towns the caseload is extremely light, and a court might meet once a month and have only a few cases.

All criminal prosecutions that occur in towns and villages are commenced in a justice court. Violations and misdemeanors are handled exclusively in the justice court, while felonies generally move up to County Court before the case moves forward.

Similar matters in some places outside New York are handled by a justice of the peace.

== Justices ==
Justices in these courts do not have to be lawyers and the vast majority are not. Many of these courts are in small towns and villages where none of the residents are lawyers. In the larger towns, the justices are almost always lawyers. The official title for judges in justice courts is "Justice", the same as in New York justice Court. However, in common usage, most people, including lawyers, call them "Judge". As of 2006, the system included 1,971 justices in 1,250 courts.

== Criticism ==
In 2006, The New York Times published an article documenting serious legal abuses in many of the state's justice courts. The author, William Glaberson, wrote: "The examination found overwhelming evidence that decade after decade and up to this day, people have often been denied fundamental legal rights. Defendants have been jailed illegally. Others have been subjected to racial and sexual bigotry so explicit it seems to come from some other place and time. People have been denied the right to a trial, an impartial judge and the presumption of innocence."
