= Timothy S. Driscoll =

American judge

Justice, New York Supreme Court, Nassau County, New York (first elected in 2007 and re-elected in 2021)
- Incumbent
- Assumed office 2007

Personal details
- Education: Hofstra University (B.A., summa cum laude, 1988); Harvard Law School (J.D., cum laude, 1991)

Timothy Sean Driscoll is an American judge, serving as a justice in the trial level Supreme Court of Nassau County, New York. He has served in that court's specialized Commercial Division from 2009 to the present (as of 2026). He is a leader among New York judges in the Commercial Division, and in the national community of specialized business court judges. Before becoming a judge, he served in the executive branch of county government, served as both a federal and local prosecutor in criminal matters, and held a prestigious judicial clerkship in the United States Court of Appeals for the Second Circuit. He has been a leader in understanding the developing relationship of technology to the court system, including speaking widely on generative artificial intelligence.

== Judicial service ==
In 2007, Driscoll was elected to the Supreme Court of Nassau County, New York for a 14-year term, and re-elected in 2021. Nassau County's Supreme Court is a trial court of broad jurisdiction, though many criminal matters are heard outside its jurisdiction. From May 2008 through April 2009, Driscoll was assigned as a justice in the court's Matrimonial Center, before his current assignment to that court's Commercial Division in May 2009. Driscoll has also served on the Appellate Term for the 9th and 10th Judicial Districts in New York. On a more personal note, Driscoll has spoken in detail about his understanding of the proper attitude for a judge as one of service to the public.

=== Driscoll as a business court judge ===
Driscoll has been serving in Nassau County's Commercial Division since May 2009 (as of July 2024). New York's Commercial Division is a specialized business court docket within New York's Supreme Court, with a jurisdiction limited to disputes of a business and commercial nature. Commercial Division judges preside over an assigned case from beginning to end. "The caseload of the Division is ... very demanding, requiring of the court scholarship in commercial law, experience in the management of complex cases, and a wealth of energy." Driscoll has issued over 500 legal opinions as a Commercial Division judge over the last 15 years.

In 2013, Driscoll was one of Chief Judge Jonathan Lippman's original appointments to the New York Commercial Division Advisory Council, created to advise the chief justice on "an ongoing basis about all matters involving and surrounding the Commercial Division of the Supreme Court of the State of New York." Driscoll has written extensively for national audiences on developments and practices in New York's Commercial Division.

Driscoll also has played a prominent role nationally among U.S. business court judges, concerning business courts more generally. He is a past president of the American College of Business Court Judges. He was a Business Court Representative to the American Bar Association's Business Law Section. He is co-chair of the Business Law Section’s Judges Initiative Committee. Driscoll is a co-author of The Business Courts Benchbook. He has provided judicial education to business court judges in states other than New York.

=== Judicial role with technology and electronic discovery ===
Driscoll is co-chair of the New York Chief Administrative Judge's working group on electronic discovery. He contributed to the bench book for all New York State judges on electronically stored information. He is a member of The Sedona Conference's Technology Resource Panel, served on its Judicial Review Panel providing advice and significant contributions to the publication, Cooperation Proclamation: Resources for the Judiciary (Judicial Resources), and has been a speaker at the conference's electronic discovery programs, including programs specifically directed to New York practice. He has spoken on electronic discovery practice in New York in other settings, and the developing relationship of generative artificial intelligence and the courts, both in New York and nationally.

=== Appellate Term ===
In November 2025, Chief Administrative Judge Joseph Zayas appointed Driscoll as Presiding Justice of the Appellate Term for the Second Department's Ninth and Tenth Judicial Districts. Driscoll had earlier been named to the Appellate Term in 2021.

== Government service ==
Driscoll served as Deputy Nassau County Executive for Law Enforcement and Public Safety from July 2004 to December 2007.

== Legal Practice ==
From November 1992 to July 1996, Driscoll was an associate attorney with the law firm Williams & Connolly, located in Washington, D.C. From September 1996 through November 2000, Driscoll served as an assistant district attorney in Nassau County, New York. From November 2000 to July 2004, Driscoll served as an assistant United States Attorney in the United States Attorney's Office for the Eastern District of New York. As an assistant U.S. Attorney, he prosecuted a range of criminal matters, including, among other things, violent crimes, drug trafficking, and white collar crimes such as mail, wire, and health care fraud, with his work recognized by federal and local law enforcement agencies.

== Judicial clerkship ==
After graduating law school in 1991, and into 1992, Driscoll was a law clerk to the Honorable Joseph M. McLaughlin of the United States Court of Appeals for the Second Circuit.

== Education and as an academic ==
Driscoll received his Bachelor of Arts degree, summa cum laude, from Hofstra University in 1988, and his juris doctor degree, cum laude, from Harvard Law School in 1991. He graduated from Holy Trinity High School in Hicksville, New York.

Driscoll has been an adjunct professor at Brooklyn Law School since 1998, as well as at Nassau Community College. He has been a teaching team member at the Harvard Law School's Trial Advocacy Workshop since 2003.

== Author ==
Driscoll has been an author or co-author of the following publications, among others;

- Co-authored the chapters on discovery management, electronic discovery, and trials in The Business Courts Benchbook
- Authored the chapter on motion practice in the treatise, Commercial Litigation in New York State Courts (Haig. ed. 2020)
- The Time Has Come (Accompanied by Affidavits): A Method for More Expeditious Trials in Commercial Cases
- Keeping Current: The New York State Supreme Court Commercial Division: Past, Present, and Future (Part 2)
- Keeping Current: The New York State Supreme Court Commercial Division: Past, Present, and Future (Part 1)

== Positions and memberships ==
Driscoll has held the following positions, among others;

- President, American College of Business Court Judges
- Co-chair, New York Chief Administrative Judge's working group on electronic discovery
- Co-chair, Judges Initiative Committee of the American Bar Association's (ABA) Business Law Section
- Appointed by Chief Judge Jonathan Lippman as an original member of the New York Commercial Division Advisory Council
- Member, New York Appellate Division Task Force on Artificial Intelligence
- Co-chair, Subcommittee on Alternative Dispute Resolution, within the New York Chief Judge's Advisory Council on Commercial Litigation in New York State
- Co-chair of the Real Estate and Land Use Litigation Subcommittee of the ABA Business Law Section's Business and Corporate Litigation Committee
- Business Court Representative to the ABA's Business Law Section
- Technology resource panel, The Sedona Conference
- President, Catholic Lawyers Guild of Nassau County

== Honors and awards ==
In 2018, Driscoll received the Judge of the Year award from the Long Beach Lawyers Association. "The award is presented each year to a member of the judiciary who, through actions and deeds, has consistently demonstrated extraordinary leadership, fairness and integrity." Driscoll was among the first group of Nassau Community College adjunct faculty to receive the New York State Education Chancellor's Award for Excellence in Adjunct Teaching. Driscoll graduated summa cum laude from Hofstra University, and cum laude from Harvard Law School. He was inducted into the Holy Trinity High School Hall of Fame in 2005.
