= Daily Record (Maryland) =

Newspaper in Baltimore, Maryland, US

The Daily Record
- Type: Daily newspaper
- Format: Tabloid
- Owner(s): BridgeTower Media
- Publisher: Suzanne Fischer-Huettner
- Founded: 1888
- Headquarters: 200 St. Paul St., Suite 2480, Baltimore, Maryland
- Website: thedailyrecord.com

The Daily Record is a statewide business and legal newspaper published in Baltimore, Maryland. The paper publishes five days a week, 52 weeks a year, except for certain holidays.

== Corporate history ==
Founded by Edwin Warfield, The Daily Record was first published in 1888 as a court and commercial paper. Minneapolis-based Dolan Media Inc., (NYSE: DM) acquired the Daily Record Company in 1994. The paper launched its Web site in 1997. Dolan was acquired by GateHouse Media in 2015 and renamed BridgeTower Media the next year.

== Daily content ==
The Daily Record reports on commerce, finance, law, business, construction and real estate, with a focus on Baltimore City and Baltimore County. Friday's edition features Maryland Business, with an expanded look at business news.

Monday's edition features Maryland Lawyer, which expands on the paper's normal coverage of local, regional and national legal trends. The paper tracks Maryland's appellate courts (the Court of Appeals and the Court of Special Appeals and selected trial-level courts, including the circuit courts for Baltimore City and Baltimore County and Montgomery County and includes significant case law and opinion digests. The paper also covers the federal courts in Baltimore and Greenbelt and the 4th U.S. Circuit Court of Appeals.

A Saturday edition was discontinued in 2008.

== Additional publications and events ==
The Daily Record produces a number of target publications focused on particular aspects of Maryland business. The company also produces the newsletter Maryland Family Law Monthly, which tracks family law matters in the state.

The paper hosts a number of annual events honoring members of Maryland's business, legal, health care and other industries. These include Maryland's Top 100 Women, Leadership in Law and Influential Marylanders.

== Blogs ==
On the Record is the paper's legal blog and features contributions from the paper's writing and editing staff. Eye on Annapolis is a government matters blog written by The Daily Record's Maryland General Assembly reporter, with intensive coverage during the 90-day session running from January to March. "Maryland Business" is The Daily Record's business blog featuring contributions from the writing and editing staff. And "Generation J.D." is The Daily Record's blog for young lawyers, written by attorneys from across the state who are rising stars in the legal profession.

== Awards ==
The paper received the National Newspaper Association’s 2007 General Excellence Award, Maryland Daily Division, circulation less than 16,000.
