= Specialist judge =

The appointment of Specialist Judges is part of a pilot scheme by Singapore's Subordinate Courts to bring experienced and well-respected members of the legal profession or academia to the Bench to preside over cases in the Subordinate Courts.

The scheme was initiated in July 2006 and Senior Counsel Tan Chee Meng became the first Specialist Judge to be appointed under this scheme to hear the Fusionpolis case. Tan Cheng Han, dean of NUS law school, was the second Specialist Judge to be appointed to hear the Informatics Case.

The aim of the scheme is bring additional expertise to the Subordinate Courts bench and, at the same time, give leading practitioners and academics a better insight to the workings of the Judiciary of Singapore.

A specialist judge is expected to devote up to 40 days a year to hearing cases and will be paid an allowance pegged to the salary of a senior judge in the district court. The pilot scheme will be reviewed in 2007.
