= Association of Corporate Counsel =

Professional association

- ACC Logo
- Abbreviation: ACC
- Type: Non-governmental organization
- Purpose: Professional society
- Headquarters: Washington, D.C.
- Members: 40,000
- President and CEO: Veta T. Richardson
- Website: acc.com

The Association of Corporate Counsel (ACC), founded as the American Corporate Counsel Association (ACCA) in 1983, is a professional association serving the business interests of attorneys who practice in the legal departments of corporations, associations and other private-sector organizations around the world. ACC states that it has more than 40,000 members employed by over 10,000 organizations in 85 countries.

ACC members collaborate through regional chapters and practice area committees. ACC has more than 55 chapters around the world. In 2015, the Australian Corporate Lawyers Association joined ACC to form ACC Australia. Other recent expansions, ACC Alberta, ACC Middle East and ACC Singapore, were established in June 2014, May 2014 and July 2013, respectively.

ACC serves as the "voice of the in-house bar" on issues of importance to in-house counsel, such as multi jurisdictional practice, attorney-client/solicitor-client privilege and right to provide pro bono services.

The association publishes the magazine ACC Docket and arranges the ACC Annual Meeting.
