= Maryland State Bar Association =

Legal society for Maryland, US

- Founded: August 8, 1896; 130 years ago
- Type: Legal society
- Tax ID no.: 52-0815403
- Legal status: 501(c)(6) professional association
- Headquarters: Baltimore, Maryland
- Members: 25,000 as of 2016
- President: Dana O. Williams
- Executive Director: Victor Velazquez
- Affiliations: Pro Bono Resource Center Inc, Legal Aid Bureau Inc, Maryland Bar Foundation Inc
- Revenue: $5,166,685 (2015)
- Expenses: $5,548,226 (2015)
- Employees: 36 (2015)
- Website: www.msba.org

The Maryland State Bar Association (MSBA) is a voluntary bar association for the state of Maryland.

The association's mission is "to effectively represent Maryland’s lawyers, to provide member services, and to promote professionalism, diversity in the legal profession, access to justice, service to the public and respect for the rule of law." The association is not affiliated with the Maryland state government and is not responsible for licensure or discipline of attorneys.

The MSBA publishes the quarterly Maryland Bar Journal, the monthly Maryland Bar Bulletin, the weekly Maryland Law Digest court opinions and MSBA Weekly news, frequent MSBA News blog posts, the Maryland Lawyer's Manual legal directory, and an annual report.

The organization was established on August 8, 1896, and is directed by a 43-member Board of elected Governors, including 32 elected by geographical districts, four "Young Lawyer" governors, and the organization's officers.

It was the last state bar association in the United States to restrict membership to men, which led to the formation of the Women's Bar Association of Maryland in 1929. Rose Zetzer became the first female MSBA member in 1946.

In 1985, the Poe School, located at the northeast corner of Baltimore's West Fayette and North Greene Streets, became the permanent home of the Maryland State Bar Association.
