= Ben F. Tennille =

American judge

Chief Judge, North Carolina Business Court 2005 to March 1, 2011
- Succeeded by: Chief Judge, John R. Jolly 2011-2014

Judge, North Carolina Business Court 1996-2005
- Appointed by: Governor Jim Hunt

Personal details
- Education: Phillips Exeter Academy (1964); University of North Carolina at Chapel Hill (B.A. 1967); University of North Carolina School of Law (J.D. 1971)

Ben Fortune Tennille is a retired American judge who served in North Carolina from 1996 to 2011. He was the first Special Superior Court Judge for Complex Business Cases appointed to the North Carolina Business Court, in 1996, and became its Chief Judge in 2005. He has also played a significant role in developing specialized business and commercial courts outside of North Carolina, including his role in creating the American College of Business Court Judges, and at the American Bar Association's Business Law Section.

== Judicial service in North Carolina ==
In 1996, North Carolina Governor Jim Hunt appointed Tennille as the first Special Superior Court Judge for Complex Business Cases to the newly created North Carolina Business Court. Tennille began with no designated office space, originally working out of his home and then temporary offices for three years, making use of technology in developing the new court's operations. He remained the sole Business Court judge until the fall of 2005, when he became Chief Judge of the North Carolina Business Court, a position he held until retiring on March 1, 2011.

Among modern American specialized business courts, created since 1993, the North Carolina Business Court is one of the earliest. In 2001, Tennille presided over the Business Court's first prominent case, First Union v. SunTrust Banks, which has been described as giving complex business litigation "sea legs" to the Business Court. General counsel for the Georgia defendant in that case, after the case was over, was convinced that it would be worthwhile to have a similar business court in Georgia.

Tennille was known for technological innovations, such as launching an electronic filing system in 1999; creating a website for such filings and for providing court documents and information to the public, which was rated a top 10 website in 2007; developing high tech courtrooms; and partnering with law schools to provide facilities and offices to the Business Court judges, including high tech courtrooms at the law schools. Tennille was also innovative in making use of early alternative dispute resolution, for example, having parties attend early case management conferences, and not simply their lawyers, and having the lawyers provide litigation cost estimates at the beginning of the case.

== Business court activities outside of North Carolina ==
Tennille was one of the founders of the American College of Business Court Judges in 2005. He was its first president from 2005 to 2007. He has worked within the American Bar Association's Business Law Section to increase the role of U.S. business court judges' involvement in the Section, by undertaking efforts to create the Judges Initiative Committee and the Business Court Representatives program within the Section. He was chairman of the Business and Commercial Court Judges Committee of the American Bar Association's National Conference of State Trial Judges.

Among other efforts, in January 2007, he met with the co-chair of the South Carolina Bar's Task Force on Courts and the counsel to South Carolina's Chief Justice to discuss creating and operating business courts. In 2008, he spoke to a committee studying creation of a business court in Mississippi. In December 2009, he made a presentation to the Business Impact Committee of the State Bar of Michigan's Judicial Crossroads Task Force. In 2012, he spoke to a gathering in Dubai regarding commercial courts in the middle east.

== Legal career ==
Tennille was in private practice from 1971 to 1985, and was in-house counsel at Burlington Industries, Inc. from 1985 to 1995 (serving as a human resources director from 1993 to 1995).

== Publications ==
Tennille has authored or co-authored a number of publications relating to business courts, in addition to authoring over 100 legal opinions while serving on the North Carolina Business Court.

- The Use of Mediation in the North Carolina Business Court, North Carolina Bar Association, Dispute Resolution, Vol. 18, No. 1 (October 2003).
- Business and Commercial Court Judges Committee, Civil Action, Vol. 3 No. 1, page 5, National Center for State Courts (Winter 2004).
- Developments at the North Carolina Business Court, Future Trends in State Courts 2010, National Center for State Courts (2010).
- Getting to Yes in Specialized Courts: The Unique Role of ADR in Business Court Cases, Pepperdine Dispute Resolution Journal, Vol. 11, No. 1 (2011).

== Education ==
Tennille graduated from Phillips Exeter Academy in 1964, received a B.A. from the University of North Carolina at Chapel Hill in 1967, and a Juris Doctor degree from the University of North Carolina School of Law in 1971.

== Awards and recognition ==
In 2006, he received the U.S. Chamber of Commerce's Judicial Achievement Award, and in 2010 he received the Distinguished Alumnus Award from the University of North Carolina School of Law. He graduated law school with honors, and as a member of the Order of the Coif in 1971.

== Public service ==
After retirement, Tennille and his wife (a pediatrician) established H.O.P.E of Winston-Salem (Help Our People Eat), an organization dedicated to addressing food insecurity issues and children's health, in and around Forsyth County, North Carolina.
