= Business court =

Business courts, sometimes referred to as commercial courts, are specialized courts for legal cases involving commercial law, internal business disputes, and other matters affecting businesses. At the trial court level, these courts may primarily or exclusively adjudicate internal business disputes and/or commercial litigation between businesses, heard before specialist judges assigned to these courts. They may have broader or narrower jurisdiction, for example patent or admiralty jurisdiction; and jurisdiction may vary between countries. Business courts may be further specialized, as in those that decide technology disputes and those that weigh appeals. Alternative dispute resolution and arbitration have connections to business courts.

== Description ==
Generally, business courts and commercial courts are specialized courts for cases involving commercial law, internal business disputes, and other matters affecting businesses. It has been said that "Any definition of a business court is, in the end, a bit of a compromise".

=== Types of jurisdictional models ===
The scope of any individual commercial court's jurisdiction over the types of cases heard may vary between countries, and there is not a single model followed in all countries or necessarily even in different regions within a country. "The common element is that business or trade activity is involved". A commercial court may be a distinct court or a subdivision of an existing civil court. The scope of a commercial court's case type jurisdiction may be exhaustively defined or may be more generally indicated.

An individual business court's scope and nature may be set by means such as jurisdictional monetary minimum amounts in dispute, qualitative requirements such as the complexity of a case, and/or defining jurisdiction in a rule or statute that lists specific case types that fall within the business court's jurisdiction. For example, the Irish Commercial Court, a part of the High Court, generally requires that commercial disputes involve at least €1 million. The specialist Commercial Court in Victoria, Australia sets out a list of case types in defining its jurisdiction, and describes itself as managing "a diverse range of complex commercial disputes". The American state of Maryland's Business and Technology Case Management Program includes a requirement that a case before it "presents commercial or technological issues of such a complex or novel nature that specialized treatment is likely to improve the administration of justice". Ontario, Canada's Superior Court of Justice Commercial List includes a jurisdictional list of case types that do not expressly mention commercial disputes between business entities, but does include a general provision for "such other commercial matters as the Commercial List Team Lead may direct to be listed on the Commercial List".

The Business and Property Courts of England and Wales include distinct specialized courts or lists for admiralty, insolvency, and patents, which in the United States would typically be subject to jurisdiction in federal tribunals, such as the United States Bankruptcy Courts or the United States District Courts, and not in specialized state trial level business courts; while the Commercial Court of England and Wales hears commercial claims akin to American business courts.

In United States' business courts (which are distinctly established in individual states and are not nationwide), in virtually all cases the jurisdiction of the court to hear certain cases is limited to disputes that are in some way related to business or commercial disputes, and generally fall into two categories: (1) those courts which require that cases have an additional complexity component; and (2) those courts which establish jurisdictional parameters (i) through a defined list of case types (ii) combined with a specified minimum amount of damages in controversy, irrespective of complexity. There are mixed models as well, with some mandatory case type categories specifically listed, and other discretionary types requiring an element of complexity. (Note: The Maryland Circuit Court's Business and Technology Case Management Program includes certain "presumptive" mandatory case types, while others categories require a judge to more subjectively determine if they are complex enough to include on the docket. North Carolina's Business Court has a similar mixed model that makes jurisdiction mandatory if the listed commercial case type is over $5,000,000, but discretionary if under, as well as a seldom used rule allowing judicial discretion.)

=== Technology disputes & cyber courts ===
In the United States and internationally, "[t]he notion of specialized courts to decide technology disputes has a rich history with noteworthy milestones". In the United States, some states have established specialized business and commercial courts that include technology disputes as part of their express jurisdiction. Singapore's International Commercial Court includes a Technology, Infrastructure, and Construction List. The Commercial Court within Ireland's High Court has an Intellectual Property and Technology division. The Victoria, Australia Commercial Court expressly includes jurisdiction over "Proceedings relating to technology, engineering and/or construction...." The DIFC Courts Technology and Construction Division has jurisdiction over, among other things, "claims relating to the design, supply and/or installation of computers, computer software and related network and information technology systems and services...."

Some jurisdictions emphasized the idea that newly created business courts would make use of cutting-edge technologies in handling business litigation, becoming so-called "cyber courts". (Note: For example, North Carolina's Business Court was an early proponent of electronic filing and high-tech courtrooms.; New York's Commercial Division created "Courtroom 2000" making various technologies available for use by the courts and parties, while also serving as "a technological laboratory" for later use in all of New York's state courts.)

The use of technology in case management may be especially apt in international commercial courts, with litigation between parties from different nations. For example, the ADGM Courts in Abu Dhabi self-describe as "the world's first end-to-end, fully digital courts platform...."

=== International business and commercial courts ===
The term international commercial court can refer to a forum for adjudicating disputes between parties from different nations. The Commercial Court in London is the preeminent court forum for resolving disputes between parties from different nations; but its competition has grown. In the 21st century there has been a steady growth of countries providing such international tribunals, in the Gulf Region, Asia, and Europe; and in the United States (New York's Commercial Division).

== History of business and commercial court creation and development ==
The creation and development of specialized business and commercial courts goes back centuries. Within the Holy Roman Empire, there were German merchant courts in the early 16th century. There were Dutch courts specific to adjudicating some types of commercial disputes at least by the early 17th century (such as insurance and maritime issues). Paris had a Merchant Court (Juridiction Consulaire) in the 18th century. The Ottoman Empire developed commercial courts in the 19th century that included, among other tribunals, Mixed Commercial Courts to hear commercial disputes between Ottoman citizens and foreign citizens, with a judiciary consisting of both Ottoman and foreign judges. The current Commercial Court serving England and Wales was first established in 1895 to expeditiously adjudicate business and commercial disputes in London, before judges who were knowledgeable and experienced in such matters. In the United States, the Delaware Court of Chancery began distinguishing itself as a business court in the first half of the 20th Century. The modern creation of specialized business courts in the United States began in the early 1990s, and has expanded greatly in the last thirty years, as has the growth of specialized business and commercial courts in Africa, Asia, Australia, and Europe.

== Business courts by country ==
There are business and commercial courts in numerous countries. Each court's business or commercial subject matter jurisdiction may have broad or narrow focus, for example a court that solely has patent or admiralty jurisdiction vs. a court that may adjudicate a broad range of commercial case types. Jurisdiction may vary between countries. For example, business and commercial courts exist in the following countries or regions: England and Wales, United States, Toronto, Montreal, Quebec, and Alberta, Canada, Ireland, Scotland, Denmark, Hong Kong, Belgium, Bermuda, Queensland and Victoria (Commercial Court), Australia, New Zealand (Commercial Panel), Northern Ireland, Spain, in France (where the commercial courts are not divisions of other civil courts, but are autonomous), Switzerland, Austria, Tanzania, Rwanda, Lesotho, South Africa, the British Virgin Islands, St. Lucia, Cayman Islands, Guyana, India, Japan, Malaysia, Thailand, Kenya, Malawi, Saudi Arabia, and Croatia.

=== United Kingdom ===
The Business and Property Courts of England and Wales, located in the Rolls Building, encompass 13 different courts or lists, for example, the Commercial Court, the Business List, and the Intellectual Property Enterprise Court. One object of creating this consolidated forum for the business and commercial courts of England and Wales was to maintain the international preeminence of their courts for dispute resolution.

In 2023, 40% of London's Commercial Court cases involved opposing parties from different nations, and 64% involved a mix of UK parties and international parties. There is a view that the more recently created commercial courts designed to hear disputes between parties of different nations will compete with the London-based commercial courts as the preferred litigation forum for international commercial disputes. In 2017, New York's Commercial Division added a "Large Complex Case List", modeled on the Business and Property Courts' Financial List for high stakes commercial litigation, as part of an overall effort to compete with the London-based commercial courts as a preferred forum for international litigation.

=== United States ===
Business courts in the United States are almost always trial level courts that primarily or exclusively adjudicate internal business disputes and/or commercial litigation between businesses, heard before specialist judges assigned to these courts. They have been established in approximately twenty-seven states. In some instances, a state legislature may choose to create a business court by statute. In other circumstances, business courts have been established by judicial rule or order, at the state supreme court or trial court level. Georgia created a statewide business court by constitutional amendment. The modern creation of specialized business courts in the United States began in the early 1990s, and has expanded greatly in the last thirty years.

In addition to business courts, a number of jurisdictions have created specialized complex litigation programs; establishing a specialist tribunal based on procedural complexity and difficulties, rather than subject matter. However, these complex litigation programs can overlap with business courts. Former Orange County Complex Litigation Program judge Gail A. Andler is a past president of the American College of Business Court Judges (ACBCJ), and a number of California's complex litigation judges (including judge Elihu Berle), and Minnesota complex litigation judge Jerome B. Abrams, have served as Business Court Representatives to the American Bar Association's Section of Business Law. Abrams also was a 2023-2024 vice president of the ACBCJ. Berle is also a current officer of the ACBCJ (as of May 2024), has spoken at its judicial education programs, and participated in its first meeting in 2005.

== English-language courts outside of the United States and England ==
New English language international commercial courts have been created in Paris, Frankfurt, the Netherlands, Stuttgart and Mannheim, Germany, Singapore, Abu Dhabi, Qatar, and Dubai (the DIFC Courts), Kazakhstan (Astana International Financial Center), and Bahrain. This reflects the growth in international commercial courts designed to hear disputes among parties from different nations.

== Non-native judges ==
Some commercial courts include foreign judges with commercial court experience on their bench, for example, former Delaware vice chancellor and Supreme Court justice Carolyn Berger serving on Singapore's International Commercial Court.

== Entities and committees involved in developing and maintaining business courts ==
The history of business and commercial courts provides considerable examples of task forces, advisory bodies, bar associations and other entities involved in their creation, development and refinement, and in providing education on their operations.

=== Entities created by or with courts, legislature or executive branch of government ===
A number of business courts were created after studies carried out by task forces preceding a business court's creation. (Note: For example, North Carolina's Governor established the North Carolina Commission on Business Laws and the Economy, New York Chief Judge Judith S. Kaye created a Commercial Courts Task Force, a Nevada Legislative Commission formed a Subcommittee to Encourage Corporations and Other Business Entities to Organize and Conduct Business in this State, Maryland's General Assembly created a Business and Technology Court Task Force, and the South Carolina Bar, with South Carolina Supreme Court approval, created a Task Force on Courts. Other examples of states creating task forces to study and make recommendations concerning the implementation of business courts include, among others, Indiana, Michigan, West Virginia, Arizona, Georgia, Iowa, New Jersey, Ohio, Delaware, Mississippi (no court created), Texas, and Oklahoma (May 2024).) (Note: Examples include, among others, the DIFC Courts' "Court Users Committee" and Rules Committee, Scotland's Consultive Committee on Commercial Actions, the Singapore International Commercial Courts Committee, Rwanda's Business Law Reform Cell, and Kenya's Business Court Users Committee.) Other groups have studied and reported on operations and practices in functioning business and commercial courts, to provide information and/or recommendations. (Note: For example, Massachusetts, Superior Court Chief Justice Suzanne V. DelVecchio created a Business Litigation Resource Committee.; Arizona's Supreme Court created the Commercial Court Review Committee.; Iowa's State Court Administration has made annual reviews of the Iowa Business Specialty Court.; Tennessee's Supreme Court created a Business Court Docket Advisory Commission.; The North Carolina Administrative Office of the Courts submits annual reports on the North Carolina Business Court.; West Virginia's Business Court Division makes annual reports.; Wisconsin's Supreme Court created the Business Courts Advisory Committee.; In 2023, Utah's Supreme Court created an Advisory Committee on the Rules of Business and Chancery Procedure.) Some councils and committees take an active role in business courts' ongoing operations. (Note: For example, In 2013, New York Court of Appeals Chief Judge Jonathan Lippman established the New York Commercial Division Advisory Council (CDAC) to implement an earlier task force's recommendations. The CDAC "is composed of distinguished commercial practitioners and Judges from around the state and [has been] chaired by Robert L. Haig, Esq. [since its inception]." In addition to providing education about the Commercial Division, the CDAC has regularly recommended Commercial Division rule changes that have been adopted after an opportunity for public comment.; Indiana's Commercial Courts Working Group evolved into the Commercial Courts Committee which has been intimately involved with developing Indiana's Commercial Court Pilot Program and permanent courts.)

=== Entities related to bar associations ===
Bar associations are also involved. (Note: For example, The Philadelphia Bar Association's Business Litigation Committee plays a role in selecting lawyers as Judges Pro Tempore to serve as court appointed neutrals in Philadelphia Commerce Court cases.; The Chicago Bar Association created its Commercial Litigation Committee "to promote discourse between judges and lawyers who handle business-related disputes" with an initial focus on the Law Division's Commercial Calendars.; The Boston Bar Association's Business and Commercial Litigation Section holds an annual event, "Business Litigation Session Year in Review", where lawyers hear directly from Business Litigation Session judges.; The Florida Bar's Business Law Section has a Business Courts Task Force.; The Ohio State Bar Association's Corporation Law Committee urged a detailed resolution to expand the Commercial Docket statewide.; The Kentucky Bar Association's Business Law Section put on early programming about Kentucky's newly established business court.) The American Bar Association has a long history in supporting the development of business courts, including, among other things, the creation of an Ad Hoc Committee on Business Courts in the 1990s, which evolved into the permanent Business Courts Subcommittee within the Business Law Section's Business and Corporate Litigation Committee; the development of a Business Court Representatives Program; and a clerkship program placing law students with business court judges for summer clerkships. (Note: The Business Law Section's Judges Initiative Committee was inspired by North Carolina Business Court Judge Ben F. Tennille (as was the Business Court Representatives Program), who served as its first judicial co-chair.South Carolina Business Court Judge Clifton Newman, Michigan Business Court Judge Christopher P. Yates, and New York Commercial Division Judge Timothy S. Driscoll have also served as Judges Initiative Committee co-chairs.)

=== Private entities ===
Private entities have also carried out implementation or operational studies at the behest of courts. (Note: Some examples are: the Institute for the Advancement of the American Legal System studies and reports for Colorado's pilot business courts (Civil Access Pilot Project); the National Center for State Courts (NCSC) Commercial Court Evaluation for the Superior Court of Arizona in Maricopa County and its study of civil programs in Philadelphia's Court of Common Pleas (including its Commerce Court); a private consulting firm's study to create a business court in Atlanta (Fulton County Superior Court); a good government organization (The Committee of Seventy) study of Philadelphia's Commerce Case Management Program.; The NCSC, working with the Tennessee Administrative Office of the Courts, also has developed a curriculum and faculty guide for creating business courts.)

== Advocacy ==
The Standing International Forum of Commercial Courts (SIFoCC) was created in 2016. From 2017 through 2024, the SIFoCC has held five full meetings, with dozens of judges from around the world, most recently in April 2024 in Doha, Qatar.

In its 2023 policy resolution, the Association of Corporate Counsel recognizes and endorses the creation and support of business courts internationally, as well as in the United States.

== Appellate business and commercial courts ==
There are also specialized appellate business and commercial courts. The French Courts of Appeal (“Cour d’Appel”) have commercial appellate divisions. India's Commercial Courts law includes provisions for specialized commercial appellate divisions. There is a Netherlands' Commercial Court of Appeals, and Enterprise Chamber of the Amsterdam Court of Appeals. Singapore's International Commercial Court is designated to hear appeals from Bahrain's International Commercial Court.

In 2023, Texas passed a law creating an appellate level business court, the Fifteenth Court of Appeals, which became operational on September 1, 2024. On August 23, 2024, the Texas Supreme Court upheld the constitutionality of the law creating the Fifteenth Court of Appeals. It is the first operational specialized appellate level business court in the United States. Other appellate courts have been described as commercial or business courts, not by design, but in reference to their actual case work, such as the United States Court of Appeals for the Seventh Circuit, and the Delaware Supreme Court. (Note: Retired Seventh Circuit Judge Richard Posner wrote that in the nineteenth century and well into the twentieth century, "t]he New York Court of Appeals was the nation's premier commercial court." The United States Court of Appeals for the Second Circuit has been similarly described as "the country's leading commercial court during the 1940s and 1950s....")

== Business courts and alternative dispute resolution ==
The significant relationship between business courts and alternative dispute resolution (ADR), such as mediation, neutral evaluation, and arbitration, is well recognized, both in seeing business courts as a competitor forum with arbitration, and in using ADR as a complementary adjunct to the litigation process. (Note: Thus, for example, New York Commercial Division Rule 3 allows for court appointed mediators and neutral evaluators, Philadelphia's Commerce Case Management Program created an alternative dispute resolution program using Judges Pro Tempore in mandated settlement conferences, and discretionary referrals to private mediation, the North Carolina Business Court Rules address mandatory mediation, and Florida's Ninth Judicial Circuit Business Court Procedures, Section 8, requires mandatory ADR, and addresses non-binding arbitration as well as mediation. The Michigan Supreme Court business court case management standards emphasize early mediation.) Examples include, among others, the Business and Property Courts of England and Wales Commercial Court Guide, Section G, addressing "Negotiated Dispute Resolution", Ireland's Commercial List, section 6(a)(b)(xiii), giving its judges power to adjourn proceedings so the parties may consider mediation, conciliation, or arbitration, Part 27 of the DIFC Court Rules (Dubai) addressing ADR, and the ADGM Courts' court annexed mediation. Some US business courts expressly encourage the use of special masters or referees in expediting some types of decision making during the litigation process. (Note: For example, in North Carolina, Kentucky, New York, Indiana, Orlando, Ft. Lauderdale, and Georgia. Delaware's Court of Chancery also uses magistrates, who can potentially be final decision makers.)
