= Belvin Perry =

American judge (born 1949)

Belvin Perry Jr.

Chief Judge of Florida's 9th Judicial Circuit
- In office 1989–2014

Personal details
- Born: Belvin Perry Jr. October 10, 1949 (age 76) Orlando, Florida, U.S.
- Education: Tuskegee University (BS, MEd); Texas Southern University (JD)
- Occupation: Attorney
- Profession: attorney, judge

Belvin Perry Jr. (born October 10, 1949, in Orlando, Florida) is a personal-injury attorney and former chief judge of Florida's Ninth Judicial Circuit. He was the presiding judge for the high-profile Casey Anthony murder trial.

== Early life and career ==
Perry's father, Belvin Perry, Sr. (October 8, 1920 – May 16, 1995) served as one of Orlando's first two African-American police officers.

Perry earned his Bachelor of Science degree in history in 1972 from Tuskegee University. In 1974 he earned his Masters of Education from the same university. In 1977, Perry received a Juris Doctor degree from Texas Southern University's Thurgood Marshall School of Law. Perry is a member of the Alpha Phi Alpha fraternity.

=== 1997 sexual discrimination lawsuit ===
A former Court Administration employee, Janis Williamson, filed a sex discrimination lawsuit against the State of Florida after being fired by then chief judge Belvin Perry after a two-year love affair. The former court worker received $65,000 from State taxpayers to settle her claim that Orlando’s former chief judge provoked her firing after their love affair ended. The 51-year-old former deputy court administrator, who was single, was fired in January 1997. She maintained she had an affair with the married judge between 1990 and 1996.

Judge Perry has been involved in two of Central Florida's most highly publicized trials. As a prosecutor, Perry was the lead attorney in the case of Florida v. Buenoaño, in which Judy Buenoano was tried and convicted of killing her son Michael Goodyear and her husband at the time, James Goodyear. As a circuit court judge, Perry presided over the case "State of Florida v. Casey Marie Anthony" (case number 2008 CF15606-0), in which Casey Anthony was charged in the death of her daughter Caylee Anthony. The jury found Anthony not guilty of first-degree murder, aggravated child abuse, and aggravated manslaughter of a child, but guilty of four misdemeanor counts of providing false information to a law enforcement officer.

In 2014, Perry retired from the bench and immediately joined the Orlando law firm of Morgan & Morgan as a personal-injury attorney.

== See also ==
- Casey Anthony trial
- Timeline of Casey Anthony case
- Jose Baez (lawyer)
- Linda Drane Burdick
- Cheney Mason
