= Death of Caylee Anthony =

2008 death of a toddler in Orlando, Florida, US

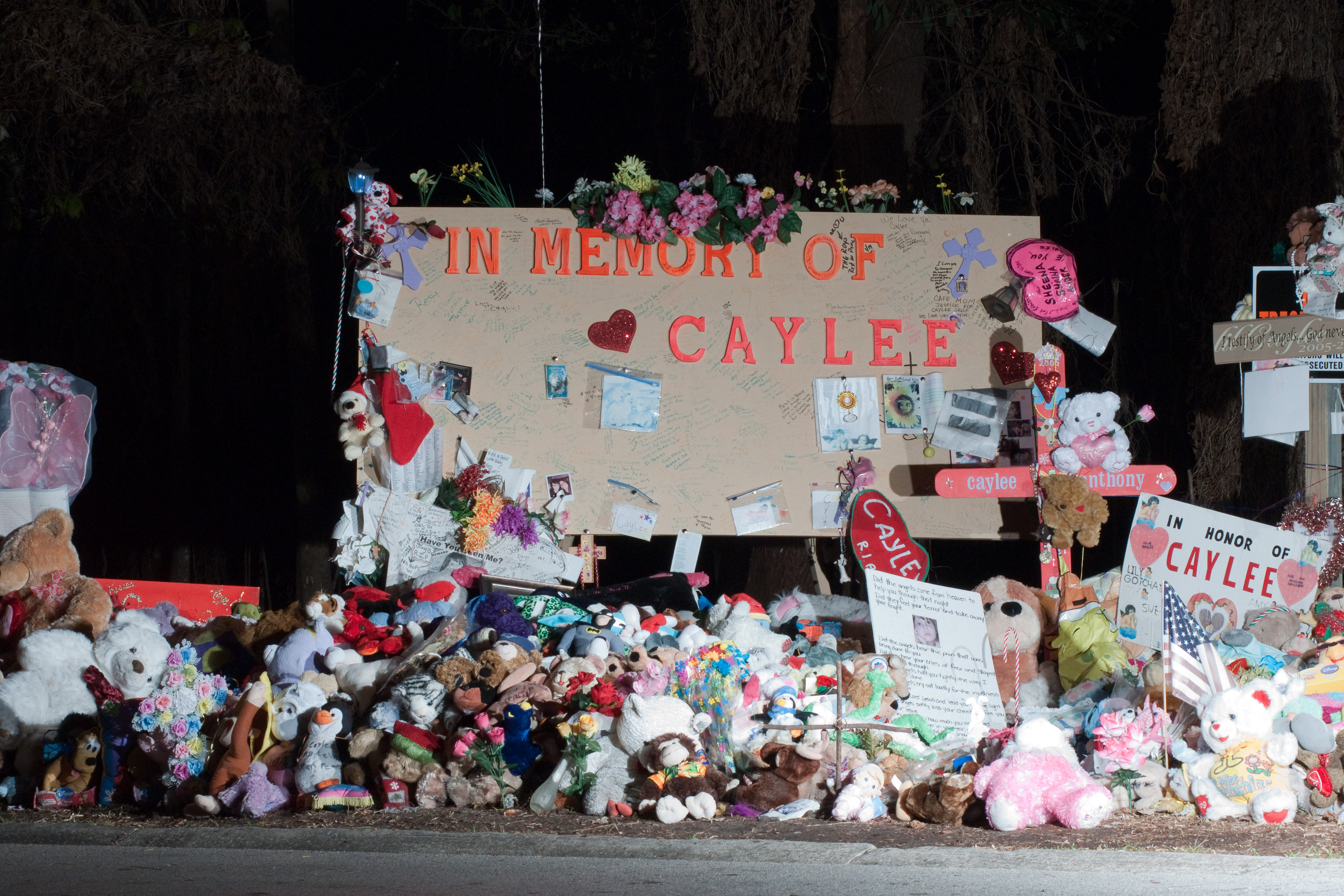
- Memorial near where Caylee Anthony's remains were found
- Date: Last reported seen June 16, 2008; Remains found December 11, 2008
- Location: Orlando, Florida, U.S.
- Type: Cause of death disputed: Unsolved child homicide by undetermined means (medical examiner); Murder by administering chloroform and duct taping the nose and mouth (prosecution); Accidental drowning (defense)
- Deaths: Caylee Marie Anthony (aged 2)
- Suspects: Casey Marie Anthony
- Charges: First-degree murder; Aggravated child abuse; Aggravated manslaughter of a child; Providing false information to law enforcement (4 counts)
- Verdict: Guilty on 4 counts of providing false information to law enforcement (2 counts later overturned on appeal); Not guilty on remaining charges

Caylee Marie Anthony (August 9, 2005 – June 2008) was an American toddler who lived in Orlando, Florida, with her mother, Casey Marie Anthony (born March 19, 1986), and her maternal grandparents, George and Cindy Anthony. On July 15, 2008, Caylee was reported missing in a 9-1-1 call made by Cindy, who said she had not seen the child for thirty-one days. According to what Cindy told police dispatchers, Casey had given varied explanations as to Caylee's whereabouts before eventually saying she had not seen her daughter for weeks. Casey later called police and falsely told a dispatcher that Caylee had been kidnapped by a nanny on June 9. Casey was charged with first-degree murder in October 2008 and pleaded not guilty.

On December 11, 2008, Caylee's skeletal remains were found with a blanket inside a laundry bag in a wooded area near the Anthony family residence. Investigative reports and trial testimony varied between duct tape being found near the front of the skull or on the mouth of the skull. The medical examiner listed Caylee's cause of death as "homicide by undetermined means".

The State of Florida sought the death penalty in its case against Casey. Relying largely on circumstantial evidence, the prosecution alleged Casey wished to free herself from parental responsibilities and murdered her daughter by administering chloroform and applying duct tape to her nose and mouth. Casey's defense team, led by Jose Baez, chiefly focused on challenging the prosecution's evidence, calling much of it "fantasy forensics". The defense stated that Caylee had drowned accidentally in the family's swimming pool and that George had disposed of the body. In July 2011, a jury found Casey not guilty of first-degree murder, aggravated child abuse, and aggravated manslaughter of a child, but guilty of four misdemeanor counts of providing false information to a law enforcement officer. A few days later, with credit for time served, Casey was released. A Florida appellate court overturned two of the misdemeanor convictions in 2013.

The case attracted substantial attention from the public—Time magazine described it as "the social media trial of the century". Television personality Nancy Grace was notable for the attention and corresponding publicity she gave the case. Casey's acquittal on the murder charges was met with public outrage, with hundreds of thousands posting to social media accounts in response.

== Disappearance ==
On June 16, 2008, Casey Anthony departed from her parents' home in Orlando, Florida, where she and Caylee lived. Her father, George Anthony, later testified that he saw his granddaughter Caylee leaving with Casey. Casey told her mother, Cindy, that she was taking Caylee to her nanny, whom Casey identified as Zenaida "Zanny" Fernandez-Gonzalez, and, the next day, she further informed Cindy that the three were headed to Tampa on a work trip.

Thirty days after Casey's departure, her car was found abandoned in Orlando and towed away. George and Cindy were notified that the car had been impounded. When George went to recover the car, he and the tow-yard manager noted a strong smell coming from the trunk, which both later stated they believed to be that of human decomposition. When the trunk was opened, it contained only a bag of trash. That day, Cindy reported Caylee missing, telling 9-1-1 dispatchers that Casey's car smelled of dead bodies and that she had not seen Caylee for thirty-one days. Cindy later retracted her statement regarding the car's odor.

== Investigation ==
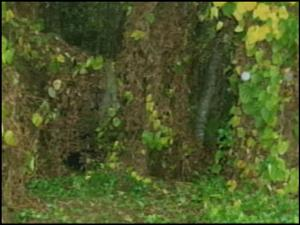
The wooded area where Caylee Anthony's body was found.

Casey told investigators that she had left Caylee at the apartment of her nanny, Fernandez-Gonzalez, and that Fernandez-Gonzalez had kidnapped the toddler. However, when police investigated the apartment, they found it had been abandoned for more than 140 days. Casey also told police that she was working at Universal Studios. However, when investigators took her to Universal Studios on July 16 and asked her to show them her office, Casey led detectives into the building before admitting that she no longer worked there; as it turned out, she had not worked there since she had taken maternity leave almost three years earlier. Casey was subsequently arrested. On July 29, Casey was offered a limited-immunity deal—in exchange for help finding Caylee. Prosecutors said they would not use Casey's statements to police against her. The offer expired September 2, 2008.

Casey's parents appeared on NBC's Today on October 22, 2008, maintaining their belief that Caylee was alive and would be found. Larry Garrison, president of SilverCreek Entertainment, acted as the Anthony family's spokesman until November 2008, when he resigned citing the family's "erratic behavior".

On August 11, 12 and 13, 2008, meter reader Roy Kronk called police about a suspicious object found in a forested area near the Anthony residence. In the first instance, he was directed by the sheriff's office to call a tip line, which he did, receiving no return call. In the second instance, he again called the sheriff's office, and eventually was met by two police officers. He reported to them that he had seen what appeared to be a skull near a gray bag. On that occasion, the officer conducted a brief search and stated he did not see anything. On December 11, 2008, Kronk again called the police. They searched and found the remains of a child in a trash bag. Investigative teams recovered duct tape which was hanging from hair attached to the skull and some tissue left on the skull. Over the next four days, more bones were found in the wooded area near the spot where the remains initially had been discovered. On December 19, 2008, medical examiner Jan Garavaglia confirmed that the remains found were Caylee's. The death was ruled a homicide and the cause of death listed as undetermined.

== Arrest and trial ==
=== Arrest ===
Following her arrest at Universal Studios, Casey was charged with giving false statements to law enforcement, child neglect and obstruction of a criminal investigation. The judge denied bail, saying Casey had shown "woeful disregard for the welfare of her child". On July 22, 2008, after a bond hearing, the judge set bail at $500,000. A month later, Casey was released from the Orange County jail after her $500,000 bond was posted by Tony Padilla, the nephew of California bail bondsman Leonard Padilla. Leonard said he hoped he and his nephew could help Anthony find her missing daughter. However, when an angry crowd began to gather around the Anthony residence, where Casey stayed while on bond, Tony decided to revoke her bond and returned her to jail. Leonard further added that Casey had not wanted to communicate with him.

On September 5, 2008, Casey was released again on bail for all pending charges after being fitted with an electronic tracking device. Her $500,000 bond was posted by her parents who signed a promissory note for the bond.

=== Indictment ===
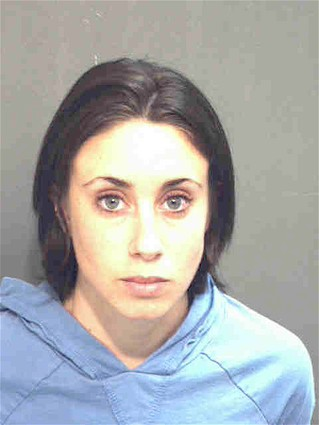
Casey Anthony at the time of her arrest on July 16, 2008

On October 14, 2008, Casey was indicted by a grand jury on charges of first-degree murder, aggravated child abuse, aggravated manslaughter of a child, and four counts of providing false information to police. She was later arrested, and Judge John Jordan ordered that she be held without bond. A week later, the state dropped the child-neglect charges because "the neglect charges were premised on the theory that [Anthony] . . . was still alive". On October 28, Casey was arraigned and pleaded not guilty to all charges. On April 13, 2009, prosecutors announced that they planned to seek the death penalty in the case.

=== Trial ===
State v. Anthony
- Court: Orange County Courthouse (Florida)
- Full case name: State of Florida v. Casey Marie Anthony
- Decided: July 5, 2011; 15 years ago
- Verdict: Not guilty on one count of first-degree murder, one count of aggravated manslaughter of a child, and one count of child abuse Guilty on four counts of providing false information to law enforcement

Case history
- Subsequent actions: Casey Anthony was given credit for time served in prison and was released on July 17, 2011.

Court membership
- Judge sitting: Belvin Perry

==== Attorneys and jury ====
The lead prosecutor in the case was Assistant State Attorney Linda Burdick. Assistant State Attorneys Frank George and Jeff Ashton completed the prosecution team. Lead counsel for the defense was Jose Baez, a Florida criminal defense attorney. Attorneys J. Cheney Mason, Dorothy Clay Sims and Ann Finnell served as co-counsel. During the trial, attorney Mark Lippman represented George and Cindy.

Jury selection began on May 9, 2011, at the Pinellas County Criminal Justice Center in Clearwater, because the case had been so widely reported in the Orlando area. Jurors were brought from Pinellas County to Orlando. Jury selection took longer than expected and ended on May 20, with twelve jurors and five alternates being sworn in. The panel comprised nine women and eight men. The trial took six weeks, during which time the jury was sequestered to avoid influence from information available outside the courtroom.

==== Opening statements ====
The trial began on May 24, 2011, at the Orange County Courthouse, with Judge Belvin Perry presiding. In the opening statements, lead prosecutor Burdick described the story of Caylee's disappearance day-by-day. Prosecutors stated that Casey used chloroform to incapacitate Caylee before suffocating her with duct tape, leaving the body in the trunk of her car before disposing of it. The defense, led by Baez, said Anthony had likely accidentally drowned in the family's pool on June 16, 2008, and that George had, with Casey's knowledge, covered up the drowning in order to spare his daughter a potential child-neglect charge. The defense further said that Casey's seemingly unaffected behavior after Caylee's death was attributable to child abuse she had allegedly suffered at the hands of her father and brother. Finally, the defense stated that the police investigation had been compromised by the media frenzy.

==== Evidence ====
In the trial's second week, the prosecution called various members of Casey's family to the stand. George was their first witness, and, in a response to their questioning, he denied sexually abusing his daughter. Both George and Casey's then-boyfriend testified they did not smell anything resembling human decomposition in Casey's car when she visited them while Caylee was missing, but George said he did smell something similar to human decomposition when he went to pick up the car on July 15. Cindy testified that her comment to 9-1-1 that Casey's car smelled "like someone died" was just a figure of speech, further noting that she had made "exaggerated" claims on the phone in an effort to get the police to respond quickly.

The third week was chiefly devoted to forensic analysis. The prosecution called software designer John Dennis Bradley, who testified that, based on a program he used to recover deleted searches, someone using the Anthony computer — he could not specify who — had searched for "chloroform" 84 times, "household weapons" and "neck breaking". After the trial, Bradley publicly reported that this number was an error attributable to a bug in his program, and that the computer, in fact, contained only one search for "chloroform". Two police-dog handlers indicated that their cadaver dogs had detected human decomposition, one in Casey's car and the other in the Anthony family's backyard. Chief medical examiner Jan Garavaglia, for the prosecution, testified that she determined Caylee's manner of death to be homicide based on physical and circumstantial evidence, including the fact that her death had not been reported and that chloroform had been found in Casey's car, noting that even a small amount of chloroform could result in a child's death. On cross-examination, Garavaglia admitted that toxicology tests on Caylee's bones came up negative for "volatile chemicals", but she maintained her opinion that the death was not an accident, given the lack of a report.

Human identification laboratory director Michael Warren presented an animation featuring pictures of a still-living Caylee with her mother that were superimposed with Caylee's decomposed skull and the duct tape found with the body. Warren said it was his opinion that the duct tape had been placed on Caylee prior to her body's decomposition. FBI latent-fingerprints examiner Elizabeth Fontaine said that she had observed the outline of a heart-shaped sticker on the duct tape found with Warren, though by the time she tried to photograph the outline, it was no longer visible. Fontaine said that she had not found fingerprints on the tape, though she had not expected to. FBI hair analyst Sebastian Shaw testified that a hair discovered in Casey's trunk belonged to Caylee and displayed root banding; Shaw said that a study he had been running and had expedited for the trial had "so far" shown that such banding only occurred post mortem. Finally, over defense objections to scientific reliability, Arpad Vass of the Oak Ridge National Laboratory reported that air-sampling procedure performed in Casey's trunk indicated decomposition and chloroform. The defense noted that Vass had been unwilling to share his proprietary database and that his forensic technique had never previously been used in a criminal case.

The defense began their case in chief in the fourth week, with forensic pathologist Dr. Werner Spitz, who had performed an autopsy on Caylee. Spitz called Garavaglia's autopsy "shoddy", saying it was a failure that Caylee's skull was not opened during her examination. Spitz said that his own autopsy could not determine whether the child's death was a homicide and that his opinion was that the duct tape had been placed post-decomposition, saying that duct tape placed on skin would have had residual DNA. Cindy, now testifying as a defense witness, said that she had been responsible for the chloroform search on the family computer, saying she had meant to search for chlorophyll but had misremembered the term. Cindy said that work records indicating she had been at work at the time of the search were incorrect, as she said they often were because she was a salaried employee. Finally, Cindy testified that their family buried their pets in blankets and plastic bags, using duct tape to seal the opening. Additionally, the defense called an FBI forensic document examiner who found no evidence of a sticker or sticker residue on the duct tape found near the child's remains.

On June 30, the defense called Krystal Holloway, a volunteer in the search for Caylee, who stated she had an affair with George. According to Holloway, George said Caylee's death was "an accident that snowballed out of control". During cross-examination, prosecutors pointed to Holloway's sworn police statement, in which she said George believed, rather than knew, it was an accident. During redirect examination, Baez asked Holloway if George had told her Caylee was dead while stating publicly that she was missing, to which she replied yes. In his earlier testimony George denied the affair with Holloway and said he visited her only because she was ill. After Holloway's testimony, Judge Perry told jurors it could be used to impeach George's credibility, but it was not proof of how Caylee died, nor evidence of Casey's guilt or innocence.

By the time both sides had concluded their case in chief the prosecution had called 59 witnesses for 70 different testimonies and the defense called 47 witnesses for 63 different testimonies. Casey did not testify. By the time the trial was finished, 400 pieces of evidence had been presented.

==== Closing arguments ====
Closing arguments were heard July 3 and 4. Ashton, for the prosecution, reiterated the state's belief that Casey had killed Caylee to free herself of parental duties, saying, "When you have a child, that child becomes your life. This case is about the clash between that responsibility, and the expectations that go with it, and the life that Casey Anthony wanted to have." He emphasized Casey's false claims (including her claims regarding Fernandez-Gonzalez), the smell in the car and the items found with Caylee's remains. Ashton called the defense's theory of an accidental drowning "absurd" because, he said, no one would make an accident look like a murder.

Baez, who Judge Perry had said could not address the abuse claims given the lack of evidence presented at trial, emphasized the circumstantial nature of the prosecution's case, saying the state's allegations were based on "fantasy [computer] searches, fantasy forensics, phantom stickers, phantom stains ... and no real, hard evidence". Baez said there was a "reasonable hypothesis of innocence" in light of the possibility that Anthony had drowned, further contending that drowning was "the only explanation that made sense", a point he illustrated with a video of Anthony opening the home's sliding glass door (which did not have a child-safety lock) by herself. He criticized the prosecution for their heavy use of character evidence, saying, "The strategy behind that is, if you hate her, if you think she's a lying, no-good slut, then you'll start to look at this evidence in a different light." Defense attorney Mason followed, emphasizing the burden of proof and which side bore it: "Casey Anthony is not required to present evidence or prove anything," he said. "The burden rests on the shoulders of my colleagues at the state attorney's office."

In the rebuttal, lead-prosecutor Burdick said that the state had backed up the claims from its opening statements with evidence. She pointed to Casey's actions after Caylee's disappearance, saying, "Responses to grief are as varied as the day is long, but responses to guilt are oh, so predictable. What do guilty people do? They lie. They avoid. They run. They mislead, not just to their family, but the police. They divert attention away from themselves and they act like nothing is wrong." Burdick denied Baez's charge that the prosecution had based its case on emotion rather than evidence. She then ended her rebuttal by showing the jury a side-by-side picture of Casey partying and a tattoo she received the day before Caylee was reported missing.

==== Verdict and sentence ====
The jury began deliberations on July 4. On July 5, prosecutors stated that, during deliberations, they were about to give the jury the corrected information with regard to Bradley's software discrepancy; however, the jury reached a verdict before they could do so. One legal analyst stated that if the jury had found Casey guilty before receiving the exculpatory evidence, the prosecution's failure to fully disclose it could have been grounds for a mistrial.

On July 5, 2011, the jury found Casey not guilty of counts one through three regarding first-degree murder, aggravated manslaughter of a child, and aggravated child abuse, while finding her guilty on counts four through seven for providing false information to law enforcement: the guilty counts pertained to Casey's false statements that she (1) worked at Universal Studios, (2) employed Fernandez-Gonzalez as a nanny, (3) had told two Universal Studios coworkers that Anthony had disappeared, and (4) had spoken by phone with Caylee after Caylee went missing.

On July 7, 2011, sentencing arguments were heard. The defense asked for the sentencing to be based on one count of lying on the grounds that the offenses occurred as part of a single interview with police dealing with the same matter, the disappearance of her daughter. In the alternative, the defense argued for concurrent sentencing—that is, for Casey to be permitted to serve the various sentences at the same time. The judge disagreed with both arguments: Perry found the statements to constitute "four distinct, separate lies". He sentenced Casey to, consecutively, one year in the county jail and $1,000 in fines for each of the four counts of providing false information to a law enforcement officer, the maximum penalty prescribed by law. Because Casey had been incarcerated since October 2008, she received more than 1,000 days in time-served credit, and she was released ten days after the sentencing, on July 17.

Subsequently, pursuant to a little-known Florida statute requiring judges to assess investigative and prosecution costs if requested by a state agency, Perry ruled that Casey must pay $217,000 to the State of Florida. The prosecution had requested $516,000 in reimbursement, but Perry only found Casey liable for expenses incurred during the period in which Caylee was reported missing to when the homicide probe opened. In earlier arguments, Mason had called the prosecutors' attempts to exact the larger sum "sour grapes" because the prosecution lost its case.

=== Appeal ===
Casey appealed her convictions, arguing that the false statements she provided to officers constituted one offense and that the statements were inadmissible because she had not been given a Miranda warning. The prosecution said that each statement constituted a separate offense and that Casey was not detained at the time she made any of the statements.

The appellate court rejected Casey's Miranda argument, but it concluded that her false statements could only constitute two offenses because they had been made in two interviews, throwing out two of the offenses on double jeopardy grounds. "We cannot conclude that the Legislature intended to authorize separate punishment for each false statement made during a single interview," the court said. But the court declined to reduce the number of convictions to one, saying, "Where there is a sufficient temporal break between two alleged criminal acts so as to have allowed a defendant time to pause, reflect, and form a new criminal intent, a separate criminal episode will be found to have occurred."

== Media coverage ==
The case attracted significant media attention. The trial was commonly compared to the O. J. Simpson murder case, both for its widespread press coverage and initial shock at the not-guilty verdict. The New York Post described the trial as going "from being a newsworthy case to one of the biggest ratings draws in recent memory", and Time magazine dubbed it "the social media trial of the century".

The Anthony case was regularly the main topic of many television talk shows; including those hosted by Greta Van Susteren, Nancy Grace and Geraldo Rivera. It was featured on America's Most Wanted, Dateline, and 20/20. Grace, who referred to Casey as the "tot mom" and made her belief in Casey's guilt clear, was, in particular, credited with "almost single-handedly inflat[ing] the Anthony case from a routine local murder into a national obsession". After the verdict, Grace announced to her audience that the "devil [is] dancing". Grace's coverage drove HLN to the best ratings month in its history, as her audience rose more than 150 percent. On the day of the verdict, HLN achieved its most watched hour in network history (4.575 million) and peaked at 5.205 million as the verdict was read.

After the verdict, Mason criticized talking heads who had "indulged in media assassination" during the timeline of the case. "I can tell you that my colleagues from coast to coast and border to border have condemned this whole process of lawyers getting on television and talking about cases that they don't know a damn thing about, and don't have the experience to back up their words or the law to do it. Now you have learned a lesson." Mason's response was viewed as especially critical of Grace. Asked about Mason's comments, Grace said, "[I]f for some chance, Cheney Mason is referring to me, no I really don't care what the personal feelings of one of 'Tot Mom's' defense attorneys are about me."

== Reactions ==
=== Defense, prosecution, and jury ===
Baez reacted to the verdict by saying, "While we're happy for Casey, there are no winners in this case," though he noted that "our system of justice has not dishonored [Caylee's] memory by a false conviction." State's Attorney Lawson Lamar said that the prosecution's case was "very, very difficult to prove," adding, "The delay in recovering little Caylee's remains worked to our considerable disadvantage." Lamar said that the state had "put in absolutely every piece of evidence that existed". On July 6, 2011, Ashton gave his first interview about the case on ABC's The View, stating, "Obviously, it's not the outcome we wanted. But from the perspective of what we do, this was a fantastic case." He said the state was right to have charged first-degree murder, and explained, "I think it all came down to the evidence. I think ultimately it came down to the cause of death." Ashton stated that if the jury did not perceive first-degree murder when they saw the photograph of Caylee's skull with the duct tape, "then so be it". Ashton suggested that the state could pursue perjury charges against Cindy for her claims regarding the chloroform searches. The state attorney's office later said she would not be charged.

Initially, the twelve jurors did not want to discuss the verdict with the media. Perry announced at sentencing on July 7 that he would withhold the jurors' names for several months because of concern that "[s]ome people would like to take something out on them". He released the jurors' names on October 25, 2011. Only an alternate juror, Russell Huekler, stepped forward the day of the verdict, saying, "The prosecution didn't provide the evidence that was there for any of the charges from first-degree murder down to second-degree murder to the child abuse to even the manslaughter [charge]. It just wasn't there."

The next day, juror number three, Jennifer Ford gave an interview to ABC News, emphasizing that the jury was not required to find Casey innocent to find her not guilty, saying, "If you cannot prove what the crime was, you cannot determine what the punishment should be." She added that the defense's argument seemed more logical than the prosecution's, though she noted that the jury was "sick to [their] stomach[s]" over the verdict. Juror number two, who requested to stay unidentified, told the St. Petersburg Times that the jurors "agreed if we were going fully on feelings and emotions," they would find Casey guilty, but they "wanted to go on the evidence that was presented to us".

In an anonymous interview, juror number eleven, the jury foreman, stated that "a feeling of disgust" came over him when he (wrongly) thought his "signature and [Casey's] signature were going to be on the [verdict] sheet". The foreman said that the state's failure to prove the cause of death and suspicion regarding the role Casey's father George had played had both factored into the jury's deliberations. In another interview, the foreman stated that the jury had been skeptical of the offered motive for the alleged killing: "That a mother would want to do something like that to her child just because she wanted to go out and party . . . the motive that the state provided was, in our eyes, was just kind of weak." The foreman said that, in an initial poll, the jury had voted 10–2 in favor of the not guilty verdict, and, after more than ten hours of deliberation, they collectively decided the only charges proven were the four counts of lying to law enforcement.

In 2021, one juror said he regretted his decision to fully acquit Casey of homicide and abuse, and said that in retrospect he would at least vote to convict her of aggravated manslaughter of a child and aggravated child abuse. He said of his vote to acquit her on the most serious charges, "I don't know what the hell I was doing."

=== Anthony family ===
Mark Lippman, the attorney for George and Cindy Anthony, told ABC News that the family received death threats after the not-guilty verdict was rendered. In response to the verdict, a statement was released by Lippman on behalf of the Anthony family:

While the family may never know what has happened to Caylee Marie Anthony, they now have closure for this chapter of their life. They will now begin the long process of rebuilding their lives. Despite the baseless defense chosen by Casey Anthony, the family believes that the Jury made a fair decision based on the evidence presented, the testimony presented, the scientific information presented and the rules that were given to them by the Honorable Judge Perry to guide them. The family hopes that they will be given the time by the media to reflect on this verdict and decide the best way to move forward privately.

— Statement of George, Cindy, and Lee

=== Public response ===
==== Reaction to verdict ====
When the not-guilty verdict was rendered, many in the crowd of 500 outside the courthouse reacted with anger, chanting their disapproval and waving protest signs. People took to Facebook and Twitter, as well as other social media outlets, to express their outrage. Traffic to news sites surged from about two million page views a minute to 3.3 million, with most of the visits coming from the United States. Mashable reported that between 2:00 p.m. and 3:00 p.m., one million viewers were watching CNN.com/live, thirty times higher than the previous month's average. Twitter's trending topics in the U.S. were mostly about the subjects related to the case, and Newser reported that posts on Facebook were coming in "too fast for all Facebook to even count them, meaning at least 10 per second". Some people referred to the verdict as "O.J. Number 2", and various media personalities and celebrities expressed outrage via Twitter. News anchor Julie Chen became visibly upset while reading the verdict on The Talk and had to be assisted by her fellow co-hosts, who also expressed their dismay.

There was a gender gap in perceptions to the case. According to a USA Today/Gallup Poll of 1,010 respondents, about two-thirds of Americans (64 percent) believed Casey "definitely" or "probably" murdered her daughter; however, women were much more likely than men to believe the murder charges against Casey and to be upset by the not-guilty verdict. The poll reported that women were more than twice as likely as men, 28 percent versus 11 percent, to think Casey "definitely" committed murder. Twenty-seven percent of women said they were angry about the verdict, compared with nine percent of men. On the day Casey was sentenced for lying to investigators in the death of her daughter, supporters and protesters gathered outside the Orange County Courthouse, with one man who displayed a sign asking Casey to marry him. Two men who drove overnight from West Virginia held signs that said, "We love and support you Casey Anthony," and "Nancy Grace, stop trying to ruin innocent lives. The jury has spoken. P.S. Our legal system still works!" The gender gap has partly been explained by "the maternal instinct"—the idea of a mother murdering her own child is a threat to the ideal of motherhood.

==== Analyses of public investment ====
Opinions varied on what factors drove the general public's investment in the trial and outrage towards the verdict. Safon argued the Anthonys having been a regular and "unremarkable" family with complex relationships made them intriguing to watch. In a special piece for CNN, psychologist Frank Farley described the circumstantial evidence as "all over the map" and that combined with "the apparent lying, significant contradictions and flip-flops of testimony, and questionable or bizarre theories of human behavior, it is little wonder that this nation [was] glued to the tube". He said it was a trial that was both a psychologist's dream and nightmare, and believes that much of the public's fascination had to do with the uncertainty of a motive for the crime. UCLA forensic psychiatrist Dr. Carole Lieberman, said, "The main reason that people are reacting so strongly is that the media convicted Casey before the jury decided on the verdict. The public has been whipped up into this frenzy wanting revenge for this poor little adorable child. And because of the desire for revenge, they've been whipped up into a lynch mob." She added, "Nobody likes a liar, and Anthony was a habitual liar. And nobody liked the fact that she was partying after Caylee's death. Casey obviously has a lot of psychological problems. Whether she murdered her daughter or not is another thing."

=== Legal commentary ===
John Cloud of Time magazine said the jury had "made the right call" because "the state of Florida did not make a good case that Anthony murdered her daughter": "Because the prosecutors had so little physical evidence, they built their case on [Casey's] (nearly imperceptible) moral character. The prosecutors seemed to think that if jurors saw what a fantastic liar Anthony was, they would understand that she could also be a murderer." A number of media commentators reasoned that the prosecution overcharged the case by tagging on the death penalty, concluding that people in good conscience could not sentence Casey to death based on the circumstantial evidence presented.

The CSI effect was also extensively argued—that society now lives "in a 'CSI age' where everyone expects fingerprints and DNA, and we are sending a message that old-fashioned circumstantial evidence is not sufficient". O. J. Simpson case prosecutor Marcia Clark opined that the jury interpreted "reasonable doubt" too narrowly. Clark said instruction on reasonable doubt is "the hardest, most elusive" instruction, "[a]nd I think it's where even the most fair-minded jurors can get derailed." Clark added, "In Scotland, they have three verdicts: guilty, not guilty, and not proven. It's one way of showing that even if the jury didn't believe the evidence amounted to proof beyond a reasonable doubt, it didn't find the defendant innocent either. There's a difference."

== Aftermath ==
=== Casey Anthony ===
Casey left Florida for an undisclosed location not long after the verdict. However, on August 12, she was ordered to return to serve a year's supervised probation for an unrelated check-fraud conviction. Casey returned on August 25 and served out her probation in an undisclosed location. Due to numerous threats against her life, the Florida Department of Corrections did not enter her information into the state parolee database. In August 2011, George and Cindy issued a statement that Casey would not be living at their home when she returned to Florida to serve her probation. According to Huffington Post, she was reportedly working with her probation officer to take online college classes in an unspecified field, while protected by her security, at an undisclosed educational institution.

In August 2011, the Florida Department of Children and Families released a report based on a three-year investigation into Caylee's disappearance and death. An agency spokesperson stated, "It is the conclusion of the [DCF] that [Casey] failed to protect her child from harm either through her actions or lack of actions, which tragically resulted in the child's untimely death."

In March 2017, Casey gave an interview with the Associated Press, saying she "underst[ood] the reasons people feel about me" and noting, as to the cause of her daughter's death, "As I stand here today, I can't tell you one way or another. The last time I saw my daughter, I believed she was alive and was going to be OK, and that's what was told to me." Casey later participated in a documentary, Casey Anthony: Where the Truth Lies, in which she discussed her life before, during, and after the trial.

==== Civil actions ====
In September 2008, Fernandez-Gonzalez sued Casey for defamation. In July 2011, Texas EquuSearch (TES), a non-profit group which assisted in the search for Caylee, sued Casey for fraud and unjust enrichment, estimating it spent more than $100,000 searching for Caylee even though she was already dead. And, in January 2013, Kronk served Casey with a defamation lawsuit of his own. In response to Kronk's claim, on January 27, 2013, Casey filed for bankruptcy with the Middle District of Florida Bankruptcy Court. Her estimated liabilities were between $500,000 and $1 million.

TES and Casey settled out of court on October 18, 2013, resulting in TES being listed as a creditor to Casey entitled to $75,000, though attorney Marc Wites acknowledged that TES was likely to "receive very little money, if anything". The next month, the presiding bankruptcy-court judge, K. Rodney May, ruled that both defamation claims could proceed. In September 2015, however, Judge May threw out Fernandez-Gonzalez's claims, finding that Casey's statements concerning Fernandez-Gonzalez were not willful and malicious.

In April 2016, affidavits by Dominic Casey were filed in relation to Kronk's claim. Dominic had testified in the murder trial, saying that a psychic had led him to the woods in which Caylee was buried, though he was unable to find the child. In the affidavits, Dominic stated that Baez had told him that Casey had admitted to killing her daughter. He further stated that Baez had a sexual relationship with Casey. Baez responded to the claims, saying that both allegations were false. In 2018, Judge May sanctioned Dominic for having failed to appear for three depositions, and the affidavits were struck from the record or sealed.

In February 2019, Kronk's defamation lawsuit was dismissed by a bankruptcy court judge, who found there was a lack of evidence Casey willfully defamed Kronk. That decision was affirmed on appeal by a district court judge in January 2020.

=== "Caylee's Law" ===
Since the end of the trial, various movements have arisen for the creation of a new law, called "Caylee's Law", that would impose stricter requirements on parents to notify law enforcement of the death or disappearance of a child. One such petition, circulated via Change.org, has gained nearly 1.3 million electronic signatures. In response to this and other petitions, lawmakers in four states—Florida, Oklahoma, New York and West Virginia—have begun drafting versions of Caylee's Law since 2011. The law in Oklahoma would require a child's parent or guardian to notify police of a missing child within 24 hours, and would also stipulate a time frame for notification of the disappearance of a young child under the age of 12. The Florida law would make it a felony if a parent or legal guardian fails to report a missing child in a timely manner if they could have known that the child would be in danger. The call for mandatory reporting laws has been criticized as being "purely reactive, overly indiscriminating and even counterproductive." One critic noted the law could lead to overcompliance and false reports by parents wary of becoming suspects, wasting police resources and leading to legitimate abductions going uninvestigated during the critical first few hours. Additionally, innocent people could get snared in the law for searching for a child instead of immediately calling police.

=== Memorials and tribute songs ===
George and Cindy Anthony held a memorial service for Caylee in February 2009, which Casey watched for the first time for a documentary released in 2022. In the footage, George bemoaned that strangers would not get to "smell [Caylee's] hair, smell the sweet sweat when she came in from outside", adding that "a hug from a small child ... gives me energy like you couldn't imagine".

Different artists have written songs in Caylee's memory. Jon Whynock performed his own version at the 2009 memorial service, and in 2011 Rascal Flatts' Gary LeVox collaborated with country comedian and radio host Cledus T. Judd and songwriter Jimmy Yeary to write a song titled "She's Going Places" in Anthony's memory.

=== Later information ===
In November 2012, Orlando station WKMG-TV reported that police never investigated Firefox browser evidence on Casey's computer the day of Caylee's death; they only looked at Internet Explorer evidence. The browser history showed that someone at the Anthony household, using a password-protected account Casey used, used Firefox to do a Google search for "foolproof suffocation" at 2:51 p.m., and then clicked on an article criticizing pro-suicide websites promoting "foolproof" ways to die, including the idea of committing suicide by taking poison and putting a plastic bag over one's head. The browser then recorded activity on MySpace, a site used by Casey but not George. The station learned about this information from Baez, who mentioned it in his book on the case, speculating that George had contemplated suicide after Caylee's death. He conceded to reporters that the records are open to interpretation; however, he speculated that the state may have chosen not to introduce the search at trial because, according to Baez, the computer records tend to refute the timeline stated by George, which was that Casey left at 12:50 p.m. An analysis by John Goetz, a retired engineer and computer expert in Connecticut, revealed that Casey's password-protected computer account shows activity on the home computer at 1:39 p.m., with activity on her AIM account, as well as MySpace and Facebook.

In 2022, a docuseries was released on Peacock, directed by Alexandra Dean, titled Casey Anthony: Where the Truth Lies. In an interview with USA Today, Dean said that Casey's pathological lying was a defense mechanism caused by her experience of alleged sexual abuse, and that police never looked at her father as a suspect in Caylee's disappearance.

On March 1, 2025, Casey posted a TikTok video announcing her new career as a legal advocate, and promoting her email newsletter. She said she was planning to use Substack to advocate for women, the LGBTQ community, and her deceased daughter, Caylee. In one of her videos, she explains how she plans to share advice and be accessible to users through email, which she also hopes will refine her public image. Casey now says that her pregnancy was the result of getting drugged and raped at a house party when she was 18.

== See also ==
- List of solved missing person cases (2000s)
- Killing of Victoria Martens
- Media circus
- Murder of Lorenzo González Cacho, unsolved murder of an 8-year-old Puerto Rican child, in which his mother figured as a suspect
- Murder of Travis Alexander, a case compared to that of Anthony, with apparent similarities in coverage and the alleged perpetrators
- Trial by media
- Unreported missing
