= Dorothy Clay Sims =

American attorney

- Born: Dorothy Clay Sims; 1957 (age 68–69); Cincinnati, Ohio, U.S.
- Education: University of Florida (B.A.); University of Florida Levin College of Law (J.D.)
- Occupation: Lawyer
- Relatives: John Y. Brown Sr. (grandfather); John Y. Brown Jr. (uncle); John Young Brown III (cousin); Pamela Brown (cousin)

Dorothy Clay Sims (born 1957) is an American lawyer and nationally renowned expert in medical expert cross examination. She is best known for her pro bono contributions to the defense and acquittal of Casey Anthony.

== Background ==
Sims was born in Cincinnati, Ohio. She was raised in Owensboro, Kentucky, and Sarasota, Florida. Sims is one of three children, and the only daughter of Benham Sims Jr., a Southern Bell worker, and Dorothy Brown, a Head Start teacher. Sims has two younger brothers: Benham Sims III (a lawyer in Louisville, Kentucky) and David Sims (died March 2014). Her grandfather is Kentucky politician and civil rights activist John Y. Brown Sr. and her uncle is former Kentucky Governor John Y. Brown Jr. Sims's cousins include former Kentucky Secretary of State John Young Brown III and journalist Pamela Brown.

== Legal practice ==
Sims began her career representing injured workers in North Florida. She co-founded and served as chair of Florida Workers' Advocates; Florida's only statewide injured worker advocacy organization. In 1999 she was elected the first female president of the Florida Bar Association Worker's Compensation Section. She remains a lifetime emeritus member. From 2003 to 2004, Sims served as the president of the Marion County Bar Association.

Sims is the author of Exposing Deceptive Defense Doctors, a treatise on her trade. She co-authored the Thomson Reuters text, Litigating Minor Impact Soft Tissue Cases. Sims has authored articles in the magazines The Champion and Trial. She is also the author of several children's books that address difficulties faced by children of injured workers.

Sims has appeared in The Wall Street Journal and Time, and has been featured on The Piers Morgan Show, On the Record w/ Greta Van Susteren, Voice of America, and In Session.

Since 2000, Sims has lectured at law schools and conducted seminars at various legal and governmental organizations around the world.

=== Casey Anthony case ===
In 2010, Sims was approached by Jose Baez and Cheney Mason in Orlando, Florida, after giving a death penalty seminar on cross examining expert witnesses. She agreed to join the defense team pro bono, and worked as the team's forensic testimony expert. Anthony was acquitted on July 5, 2011.

=== Current activity ===
Sims consults with and trains lawyers around the world in the art of cross examining medical experts.
