= Nordlicht =

Nordlicht may refer to:

- Mark Nordlicht (born 1968), an accused criminal and a failed hedge fund manager
- Nordlicht, a 2019 album by Versengold
- Operation Nordlicht (1942)
- Operation Nordlicht (1944–45)
- SS Nordlicht, a 1936 cargo ship formerly SS Kolno
- Nordlicht, a steam locomotive in the LDE – Peter Rothwell to Nordlicht series
- Northern Lights (1938 film), a German film directed by Herbert B. Fredersdorf

== See also ==
- Operation Northern Lights (disambiguation)
