= Linda Drane Burdick =

American attorney

Linda Drane Burdick (born October 12, 1964) was the Chief Assistant State Attorney at the Orange and Osceola County State Attorney's Office in Orlando, Florida. She was the lead prosecutor on the State of Florida vs. Casey Anthony case.

== Background ==
Linda Drane Burdick was born and raised in Lower Burrell, Pennsylvania. She is the daughter of Marilyn Jacobs and Don Drane. She has one younger sister, Cindy. Drane Burdick attended Lower Burrell High School where in addition to her studies, she participated in a variety of extracurricular activities including softball, gymnastics, French club, Explorers, Junior Achievement, and newspaper staff. When it came time for college, Burdick considered international relations or social science. Instead she earned her undergraduate degree in political science from the University of Pittsburgh, then graduated from its School of Law in 1989. Drane Burdick currently resides in Orlando, Florida and has one daughter.

== Career ==
Linda Drane Burdick began work at the State Attorney's Office on October 10, 1989. She has prosecuted numerous high-profile felony cases. In 2001, she won a conviction over Theodore Rodgers Jr., who on Valentine’s Day shot and killed his wife at a day care center because, he said, he believed she was having an affair with her ex-husband. Rodgers was sentenced to death. She successfully convicted Franklin Lee Reed in 2003 for the 1986 rape and murder of 13-year-old Mollie Pittman, a Lockhart Junior High school student. Pittman's body was found in a Needles Drive home on May 11, 1986—stabbed 12 times with an ice pick. In 2005, she obtained three life sentences for Brent Mackinder, who was convicted of raping a 7-year-old girl and then trying to kill her along West Orange Trail. Also in 2005, she prosecuted Derek Pelto, who killed his girlfriend by stabbing her and then striking her repeatedly with a hammer. Pelto was sentenced to life in prison. She was the prosecutor in the 2005 case of the State of Florida vs. Clyde Blount. Blount shot and killed a 16-year-old who he said had been bullying his son. Blount was convicted of manslaughter. More recently, in 2008, Burdick prosecuted Aurlieas McClarty, who walked into an Orlando U-Haul, shot two employees dead and fled with $200. McClarty was sentenced to life in prison. She is most well known for being the lead prosecutor on the State of Florida vs. Casey Marie Anthony in 2011 for the death of Caylee Anthony. Anthony was acquitted of the murder charges on July 5, 2011.

Those who have worked with Drane Burdick describe her as resilient, meticulous, driven, dogged and even a bit aloof. But, they add, a certain amount of emotional distance is to be expected from anyone who has remained sane after 23 years prosecuting alleged child abusers, sexual predators, murderers and rapists.

Drane Burdick was one of 23 candidates being considered to fill a vacant judicial seat in the Ninth Circuit Judicial Court in February 2012. Ultimately, she was not appointed to the position. In August 2012, State Attorney Elect, Jeff Ashton, named Drane Burdick as his Chief Assistant State Attorney.

Drane Burdick returned to the courtroom in November 2013 as lead prosecutor in the State of Florida vs. Jason Rodriguez. Rodriguez was accused of a mass shooting in an office complex in downtown Orlando, FL that left five people injured and one dead in November 2009. After days of complex testimony delving into the mind of a killer, prosecutor Linda Drane Burdick told jurors that the case against the Gateway Center shooter boiled down to one question alone: "Did Jason Rodriguez know it was wrong to kill people?" Less than 3 1/2 hours later, a 12-member jury returned its verdict: Rodriguez was guilty of first-degree murder in the shooting death of 26-year-old Otis Beckford, and five counts of attempted first-degree murder for wounding five other people Nov. 6, 2009.

Drane Burdick remains the Chief Assistant State Attorney under State Attorney Jeff Ashton.

== Casey Anthony Trial ==
The trial began on May 24, 2011, at the Orange County Courthouse, with Judge Belvin Perry presiding. Linda Drane Burdick was the lead attorney for the state of Florida while Jeffrey Ashton and Frank George served as co-counsel. In the opening statements of the widely publicized trial, Linda Drane Burdick described the story of the disappearance of Caylee Anthony day-by-day. The state alleged an intentional murder and sought the death penalty against Casey Anthony. Prosecutors stated that Anthony used chloroform to render her daughter unconscious before putting duct tape over her nose and mouth to suffocate her, and left Caylee's body in the trunk of her car for a few days before disposing of it. They painted Anthony as a party girl who killed her daughter to free herself from parental responsibility and enjoy her personal life. Caylee Marie Anthony had been missing for 31 days before police were called. Four hundred pieces of evidence were presented and the trial lasted 33 days, concluding on July 4, 2011. On July 5, 2011, after deliberating 11 hours over the course of 2 days, the Pinellas County, Florida jury acquitted Casey Anthony of first-degree murder, aggravated manslaughter of a child, or aggravated child abuse. She was convicted on four misdemeanor counts of providing false information to a law enforcement officer.

Drane Burdick was portrayed by Elizabeth Mitchell in the 2013 television movie Prosecuting Casey Anthony. Rob Lowe starred as Jeff Ashton and Oscar Nunez portrayed defense attorney Jose Baez.

== See also ==
- Jose Baez (lawyer)
- Cheney Mason
