= Pamela Brown (journalist) =

American TV reporter/newscaster (born 1983)

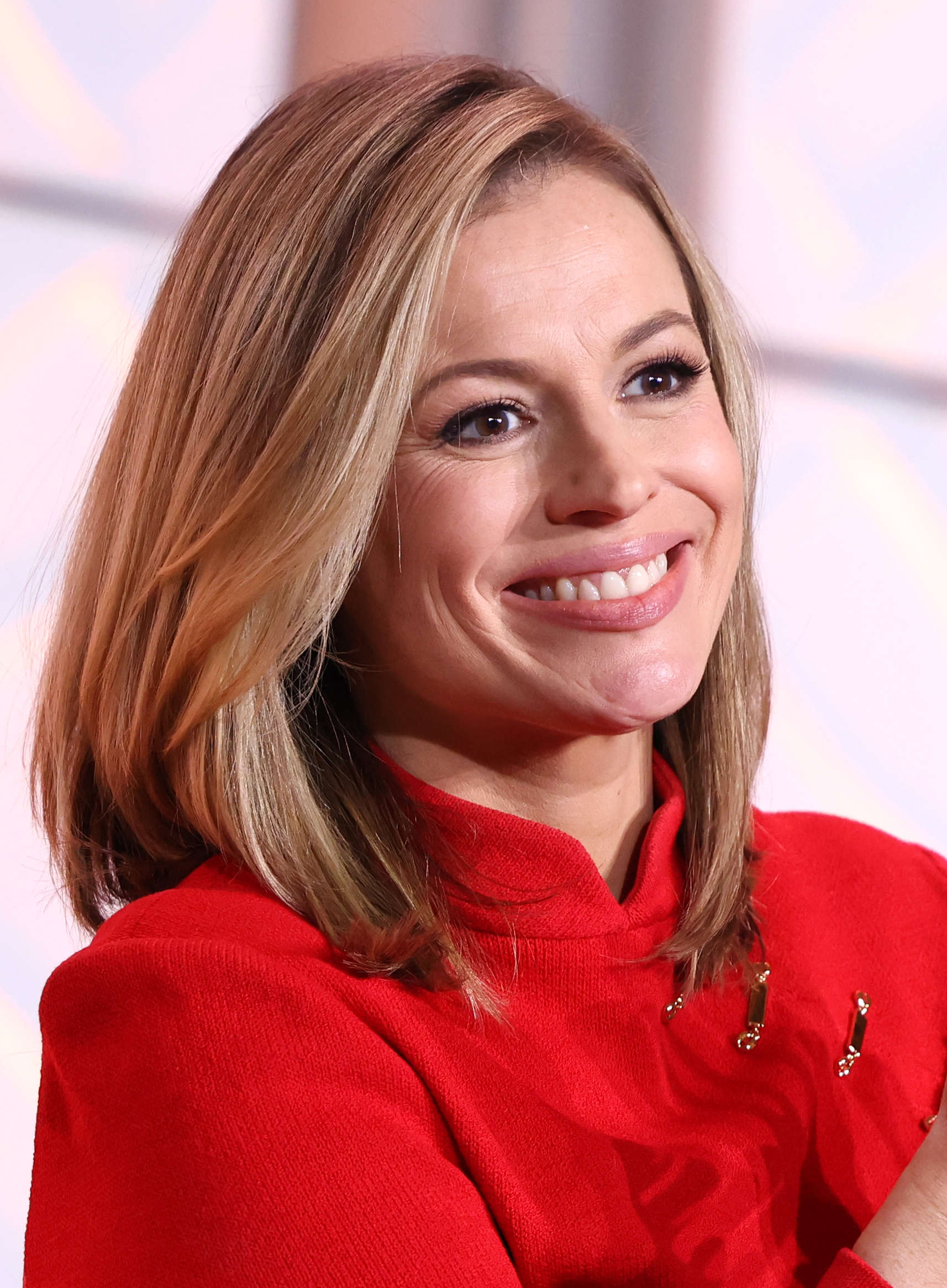
- Brown in 2025
- Born: Pamela Ashley Brown; November 29, 1983 (age 42); Lexington, Kentucky, U.S.
- Education: University of North Carolina at Chapel Hill (BS); George Washington University Law School (MSL)
- Occupations: Television reporter; newscaster
- Known for: Anchor and chief investigative correspondent, CNN
- Spouse: Adam Wright (m. 2017)
- Children: 3
- Parents: John Y. Brown Jr. (father); Phyllis George (mother)
- Family: John Y. Brown Sr. (paternal grandfather); John Young Brown III (paternal half-brother); Dorothy Clay Sims (cousin)

Pamela Ashley Brown (born November 29, 1983) is an American television reporter and newscaster. She is currently CNN's chief investigative correspondent and anchor. Since March 2025, she has served, together with Wolf Blitzer, as the co-host of The Situation Room with Wolf Blitzer and Pamela Brown. She also previously had served as host of CNN Newsroom broadcasts. She formerly worked for ABC Washington, D.C., affiliate WJLA-TV, and she is also fill-in and substitute anchor for CNN's The Situation Room with Wolf Blitzer during its early evening run and Erin Burnett OutFront. Brown occasionally provided the lead-in to "Politico's Video Playback"—a daily recap of the previous night's American late-night talk shows.

== Early life ==
Brown was born in Lexington, Kentucky, the daughter of businessman and former Governor of Kentucky John Y. Brown Jr. (1933–2022) and former Miss America and businesswoman Phyllis George (1949–2020). Brown is the granddaughter of politician John Y. Brown Sr. and the half-sister of former Kentucky Secretary of State John Y. Brown, III. Her parents divorced in 1996 after 17 years of marriage, when Brown was 13.

Brown graduated from Henry Clay High School in Lexington and the University of North Carolina at Chapel Hill with a degree in broadcast journalism. While at the University of North Carolina, Brown was a reporter on the university's Carolina Week. After college, she worked for ABC-affiliate WJLA-TV in Washington. Brown obtained a Master of Studies in Law (MSL) degree at George Washington University Law School.

== Career ==
In January 2021, CNN announced that Brown would move to senior Washington correspondent and would host three hours of CNN Newsroom on weekends.

On August 14, 2023, CNN announced in a major programming overhaul that Brown would helm a new weekday show from 3–4 p.m. ET entitled The Bulletin with Pamela Brown. In February 2024, it was announced that The Bulletin would instead air at 11 a.m. ET, and premiere once Brown returns from maternity leave. In September 2024, Brown began hosting the hour—which had been filled by Wolf Blitzer in the interim—under the CNN Newsroom branding instead. On January 23, 2025, it was announced that Blitzer's evening show The Situation Room would move to a 10 a.m.–12 p.m. timeslot, with Brown as a co-anchor.

Brown would officially begin co-hosting The Situation Room with Blitzer in March 2025.

== Personal life ==
Brown has an older brother, Lincoln (born 1980) and three half-siblings from her father's prior marriage. Brown was named after her aunt Pamela Brown, who died in 1970 at the age of 28 together with her husband Rod Anderson and balloonist Malcolm Brighton, in an ill-fated attempt to cross the Atlantic Ocean in a Rozière balloon, Free Life.

Brown married Adam Wright on June 5, 2017. In June 2018, their son was born, followed by a daughter in February 2020, and another son in February 2024.
