= Winthrop House =

Residential House of Harvard College

- Residential House at Harvard University
- Harvard University
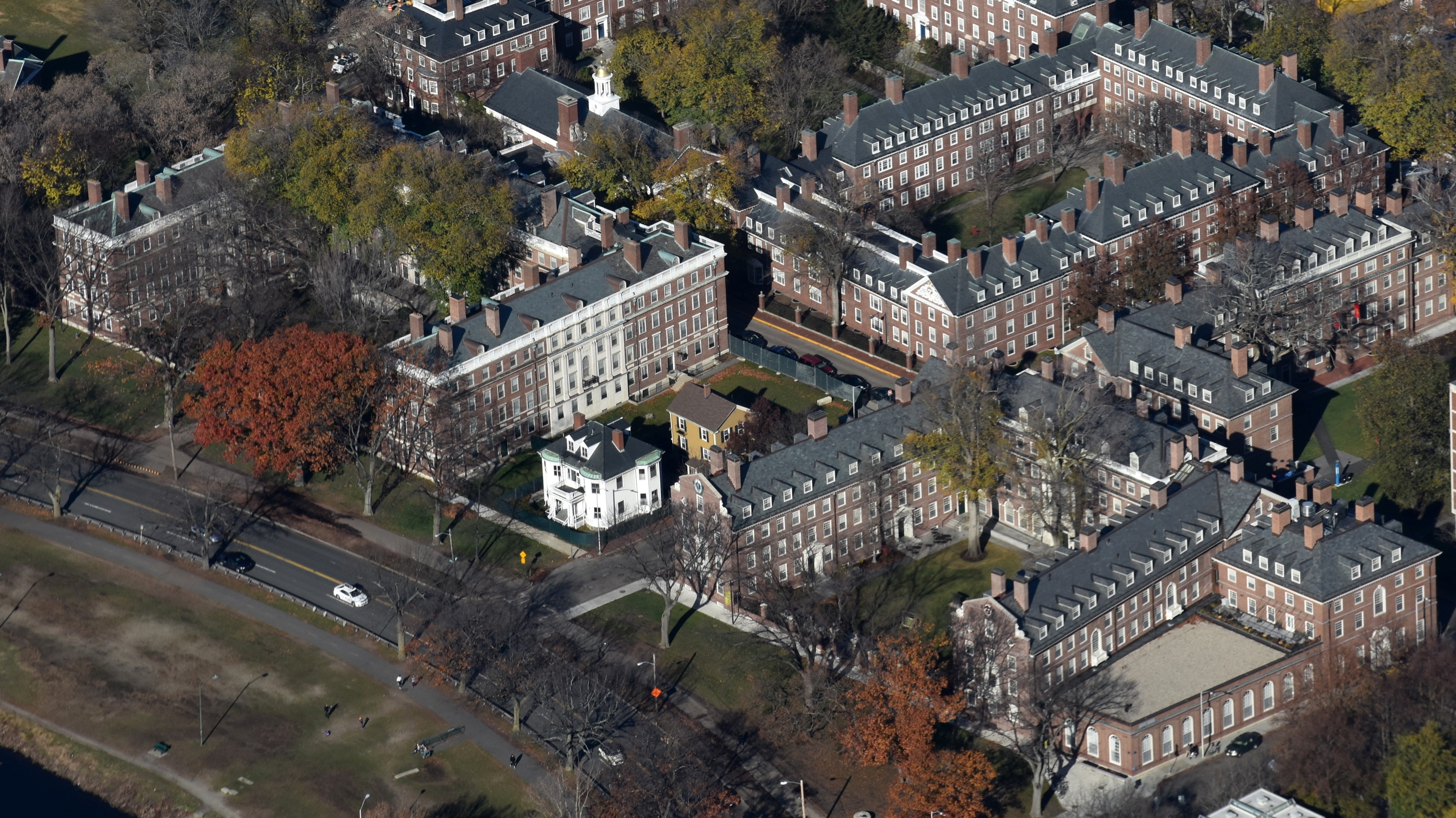
- The open courtyard of Winthrop's Gore Hall (left) faces Memorial Drive and the Charles River, along with Leverett's McKinlock Hall (right) and Lowell House (top)

- Shield
- Location: 32 Mill Street
- Coordinates: 42°22′13″N 71°07′09″W
- Full name: John Winthrop House
- Established: 1931
- Named for: John Winthrop
- Sister college: Davenport College
- Freshman dorm: Hollis Hall and Holworthy Hall
- Faculty Deans: Stephen Chong and Kiran Gajwani
- Tutors: 20
- Website: winthrop.harvard.edu

Winthrop House is one of 12 undergraduate residential Houses at Harvard University, an Ivy League university in Cambridge, Massachusetts, which houses approximately 400 upper class undergraduates.

Winthrop house consists of two buildings, Standish Hall and Gore Hall, flanking the venerable Kaneb Courtyard, originally freshman dormitories built in 1912. In 1931 they were joined as John Winthrop House, one of the seven original Harvard houses in which students reside from sophomore through senior years. Historically, Winthrop was also one of the first Harvard houses open to Catholic and Jewish students. Winthrop House maintains an affiliation with Davenport College at Yale University.

The house's name was thought to have honored two notable men who shared the name "John Winthrop"—the first governor of the Massachusetts Bay Colony, as well as his descendant, an 18th-century astronomer who was both a Harvard professor and president of the university. After calls to disassociate the house from their namesakes given the men's involvement with slavery, a committee was formed to review the house's renaming. In 2025, they found that the elder John Winthrop was not officially the house's namesake despite common thought, and John Winthrop House was officially renamed to Winthrop House.

The house shield is from the Winthrop family coat of arms: a lion with three chevrons in the background. In heraldric language, the blazon of the house shield is "Argent three chevrons Gules overall a lion rampant Sable."

The current faculty deans of Winthrop House are Stephen Chong and Kiran Gajwani, who were appointed to replace interim deans Mark Gearan and Mary Herlihy-Gearan. Gearan and Herlihy-Gearan took over for a one-year term following the college's decision to let go of former deans Ronald S. Sullivan Jr. and Stephanie Robinson in 2019.

== The two John Winthrops ==
The first John Winthrop (1588–1649) was a member of the English gentry. In 1630, at the age of 41, Winthrop sold his home and sailed for New England, recording his visions that the New World could be a "city on a hill." He served as leader of the Massachusetts Bay Company, then later became the first governor of the Massachusetts Bay Colony, a position he held for over sixteen years.

His great-great-great-grandson John Winthrop (1714–1779) was the Hollis Professor of Mathematicks and Natural Philosophy from the age of 24 until his death at 65. Regarded as the first American astronomer, Winthrop also served briefly as the president of Harvard from 1773 to 1774.

== Structure ==
Standish Hall, John Winthrop House, at Harvard University

=== Architecture ===
The two halls which would become Winthrop House were built in the same year and share many attributes. Both are four-story U-shaped buildings surrounding courtyards, with a gated open side facing the Charles River. Their facades are based on Sir Christopher Wren's late-17th-century garden wing of the Hampton Court Palace.

The present Gore Hall maintains the memory of Christopher Gore, who had bequeathed funds for construction (1841) of a prior Gore Hall at Harvard College, which was demolished about the time the present Gore Hall was built. (Note: Harvard University (1949). Education, bricks and mortar: Harvard buildings and their contribution to the advancement of learning. Harvard University. p. 66. ISBN 9780674238855.) It contains the Winthrop House dining hall in a below-street-level space at its center. In the corresponding spot, Standish Hall contains the Winthrop House Library, which holds the largest private collection of John Singleton Copley portraits. When Standish was still a stand-alone dormitory for freshmen, what is now the library was then its dining hall.

=== Gates ===
Two gates at opposite ends of the Yellowwood Courtyard, both built in 1914, connect Gore and Standish Halls. The front entrance, facing Mill Street, is the Winthrop Gate. The house shield is welded in the front.

On the river side stands the Fly Club Gate, an English Baroque structure named after one of Harvard's male-only final clubs whose members provided a grant to build it. The panther symbol of the Fly Club is centered within the ironwork above the entry, and inscribed is the dedication: "For Friendships Made in College the Fly Club in Gratitude has Built this Gate."

=== The JFK Suite ===
Winthrop House's most famous former inhabitant was President John F. Kennedy. Harvard University maintains Kennedy's former senior year dorm room in Gore Hall as a private room for guests of the university, especially political notables who visit Harvard Kennedy School. The room has been renovated and redecorated by the Institute of Politics in order to make it more accommodating to visiting guests. The study is furnished with a plaque commemorating the late President Kennedy, a leather couch, and a large rug, along with framed photographs of Kennedy. The Kennedy Suite's bedroom has two twin beds, as well as a shelf of books written by and about President Kennedy.

== Traditional social events ==
=== Stein Club ===
Stein Club is a themed event featuring beer and snacks for Winthrop Residents every other Thursday evening. It is usually held in Winthrop's Junior Common Room. Winthrop House sells beer steins annually with the house crest on them to be used at the stein clubs, though having one is not required to partake. Recent Stein Club themes include "Kung Fu," "Comedy Night," "Oktoberfest," "Regatta," and others. Stein Club is one of the most well attended events held in the house. Although many believe that Edward Kennedy began Winthrop's Stein Club tradition, this is not true. The origin of this apocryphal story is a humorous article that appeared in the Harvard Independent.

=== Arbella Ball ===
The Winthrop Arbella Ball is the house's annual spring formal dance. It is named after the Arbella, the ship upon which the first John Winthrop ventured to the new World. The ball typically features a live band playing under a beautiful tent before a temporary dance floor set up in the Gore Courtyard, and a reception in the Winthrop Junior Common Room.

=== Thropstock ===
Thropstock is Winthrop's annual spring carnival, held in late April or early May. Thropstock typically features blow-up rides and games in the courtyard, a picnic lunch, cotton candy, and live music by Harvard student bands. Recent performers include Plan B for the Type A's, So Long Princess, and others.

== Notable alumni ==
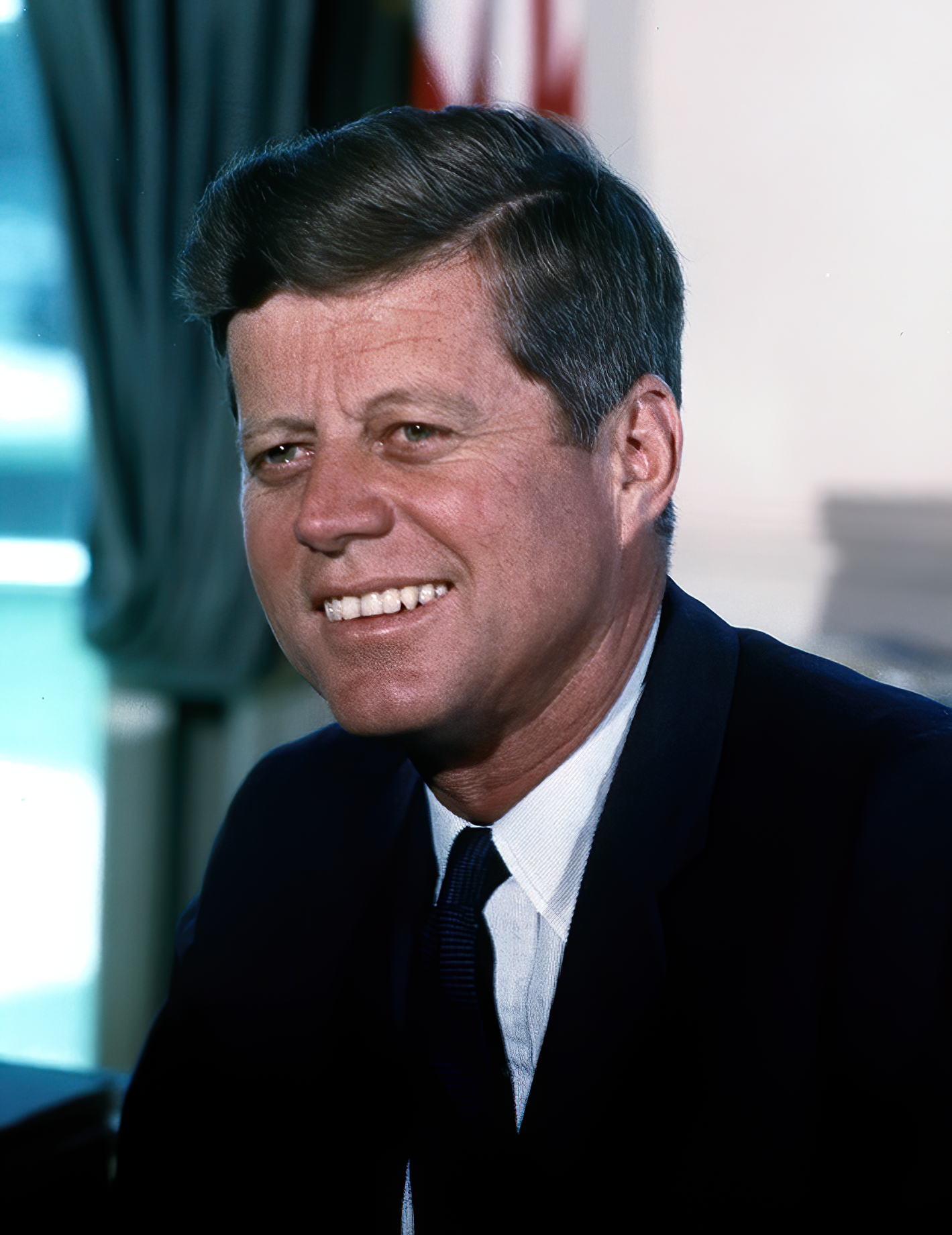
John F. Kennedy

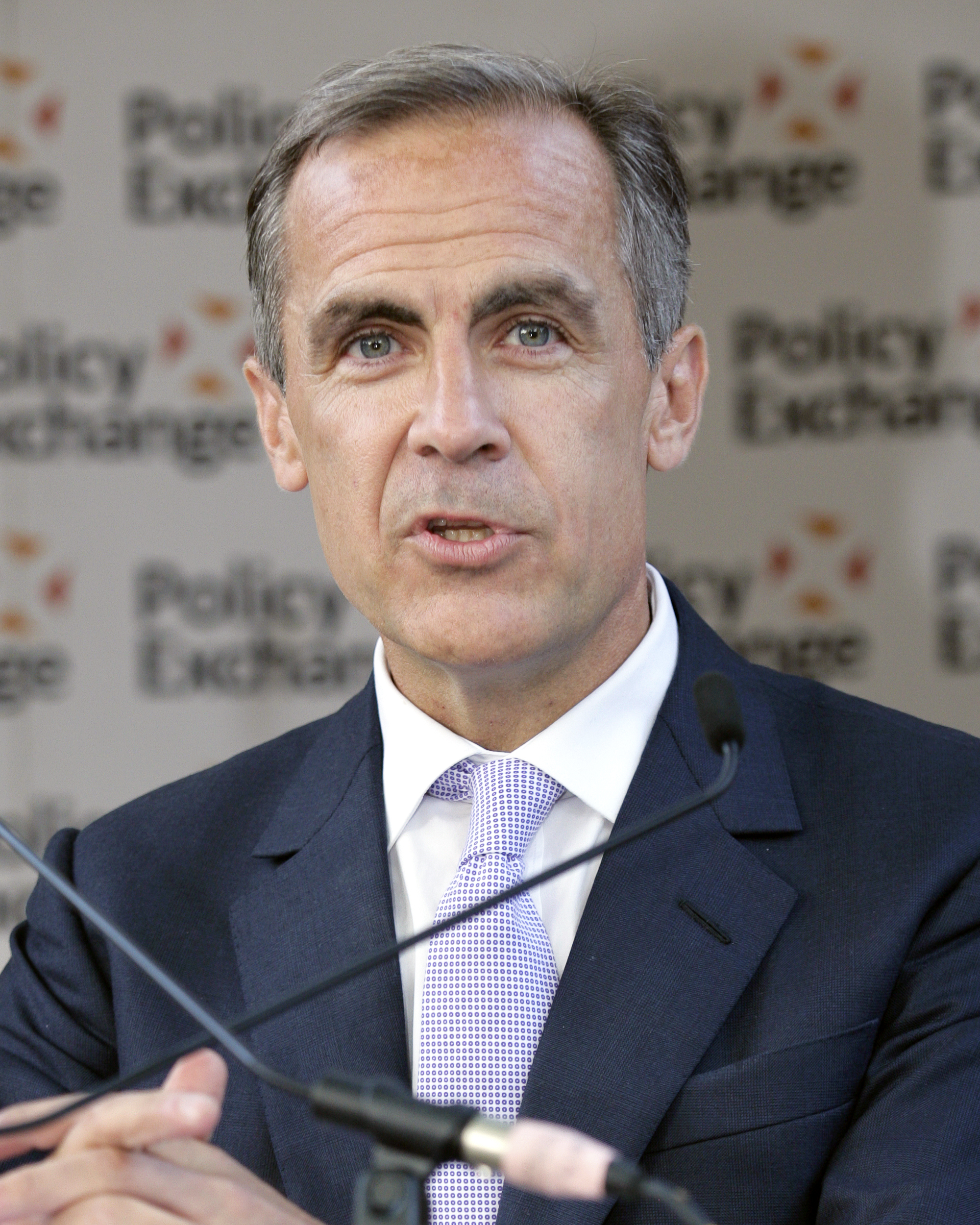
Mark Carney

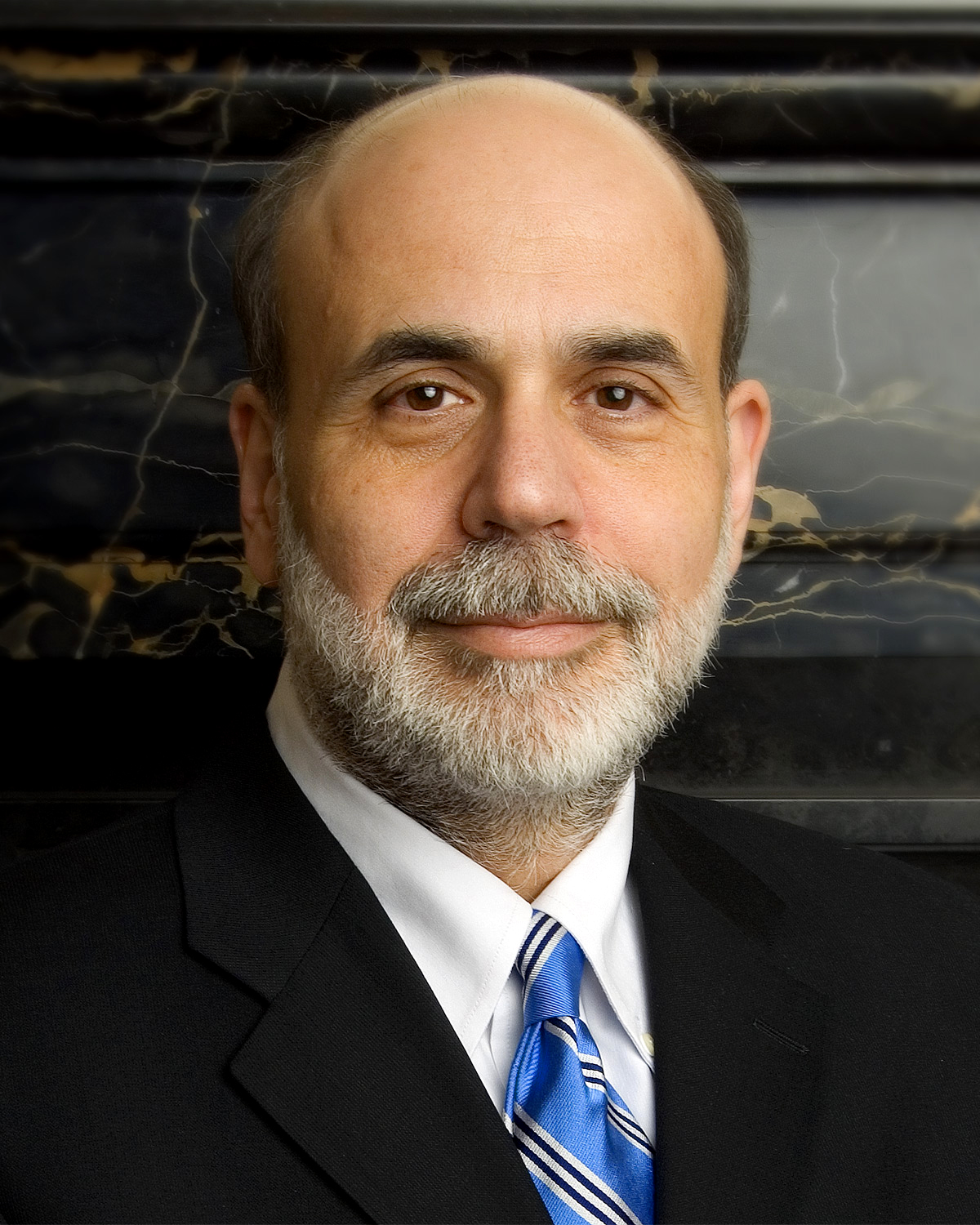
Ben Bernanke

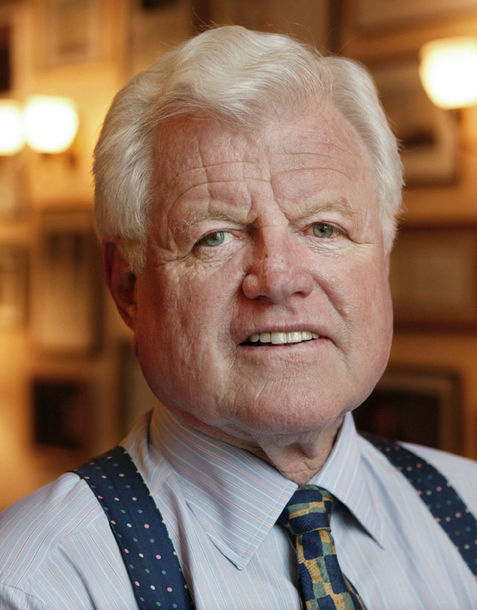
Ted Kennedy

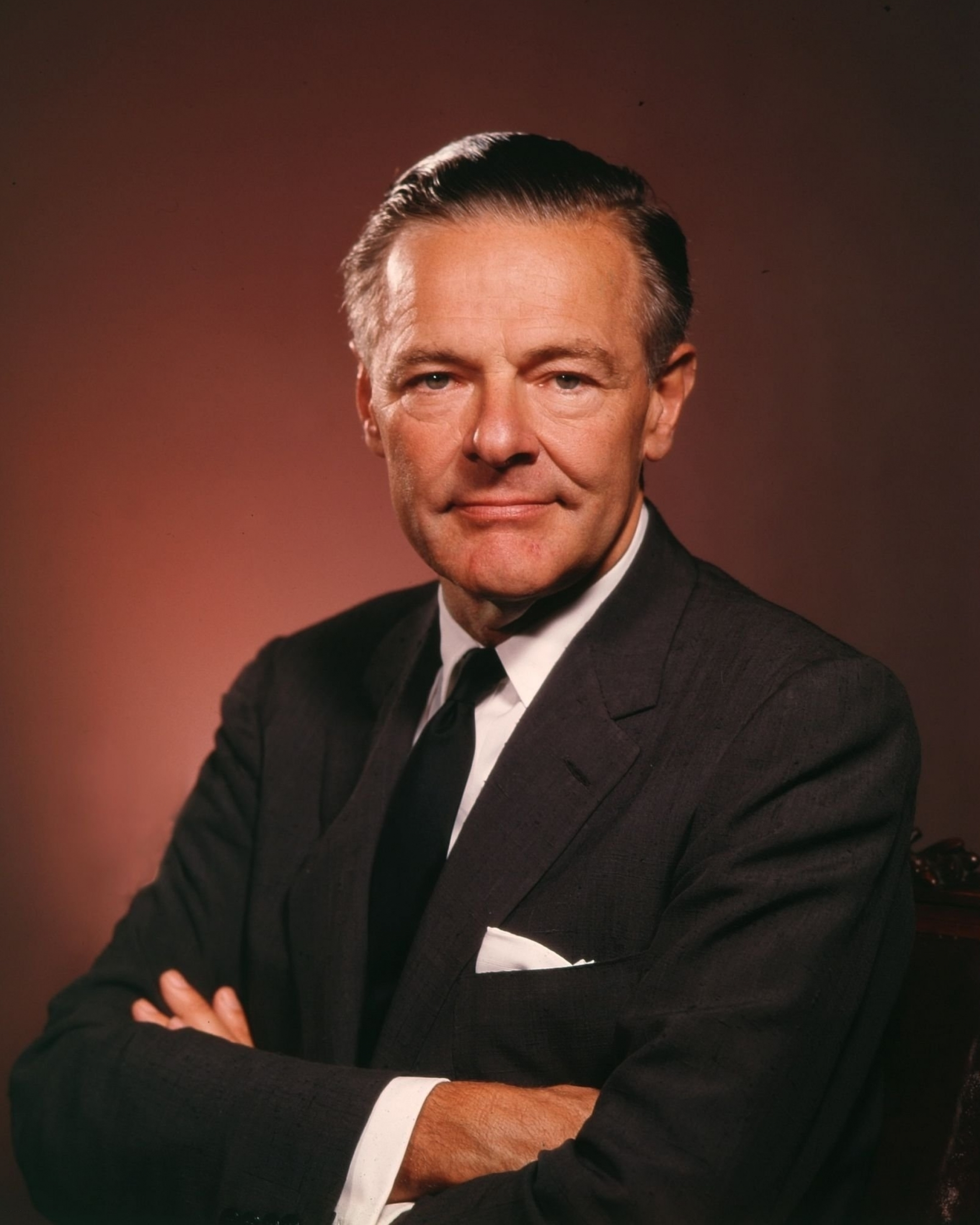
Henry Cabot Lodge Jr.

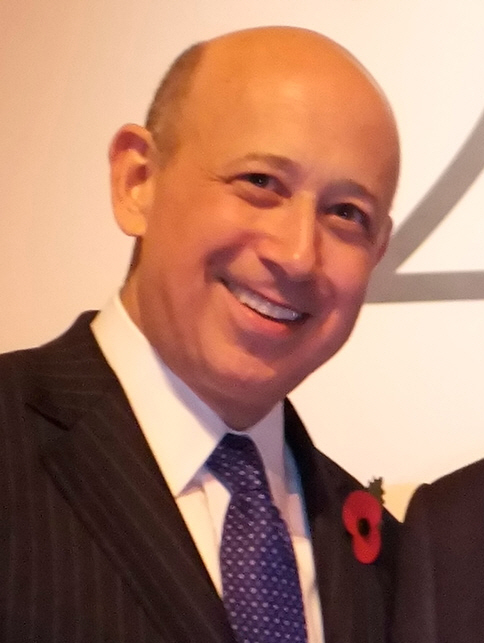
Lloyd Blankfein

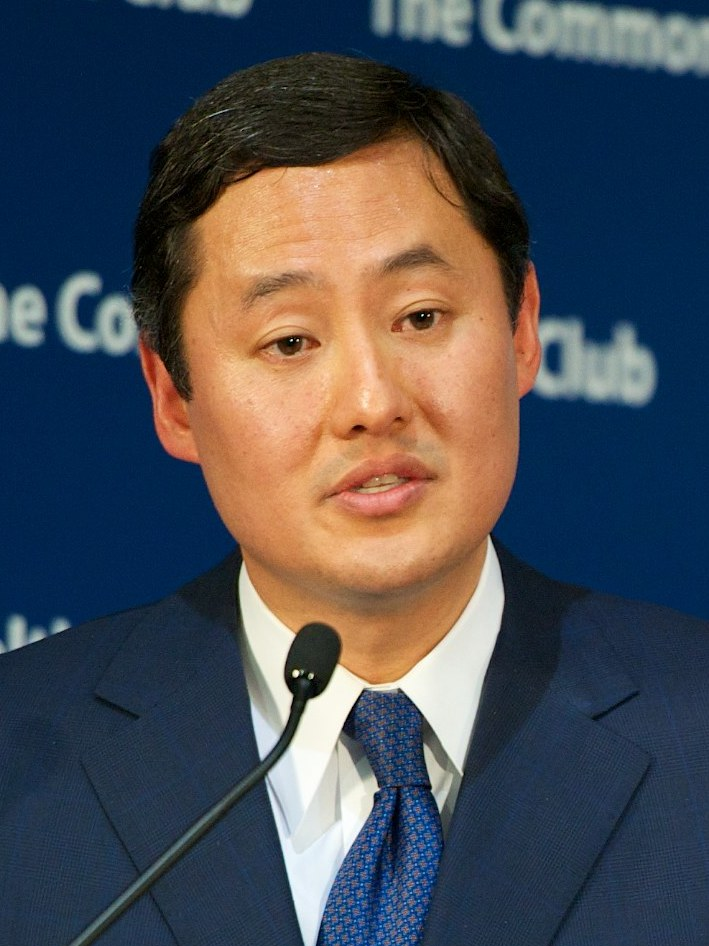
John Yoo

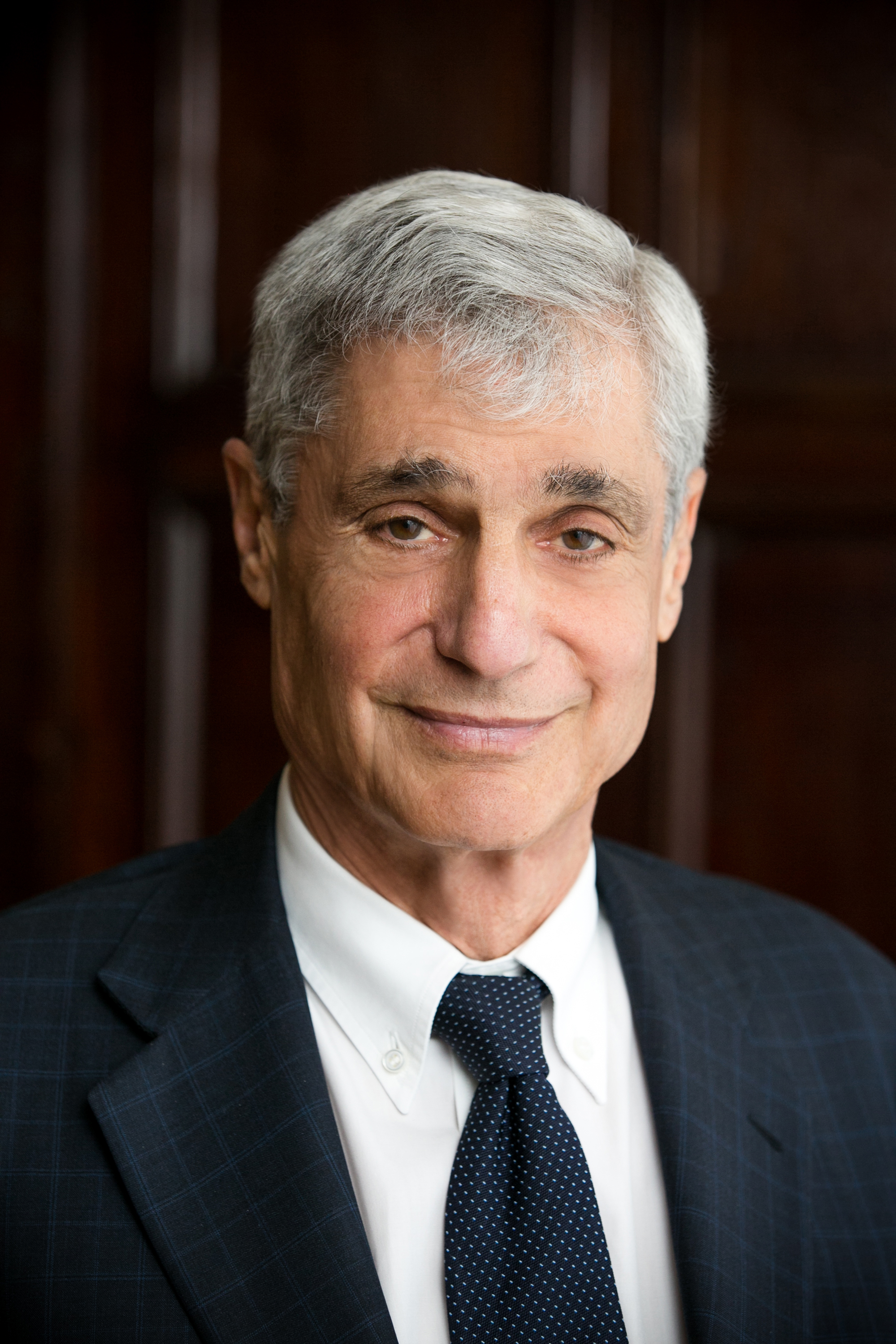
Robert Rubin

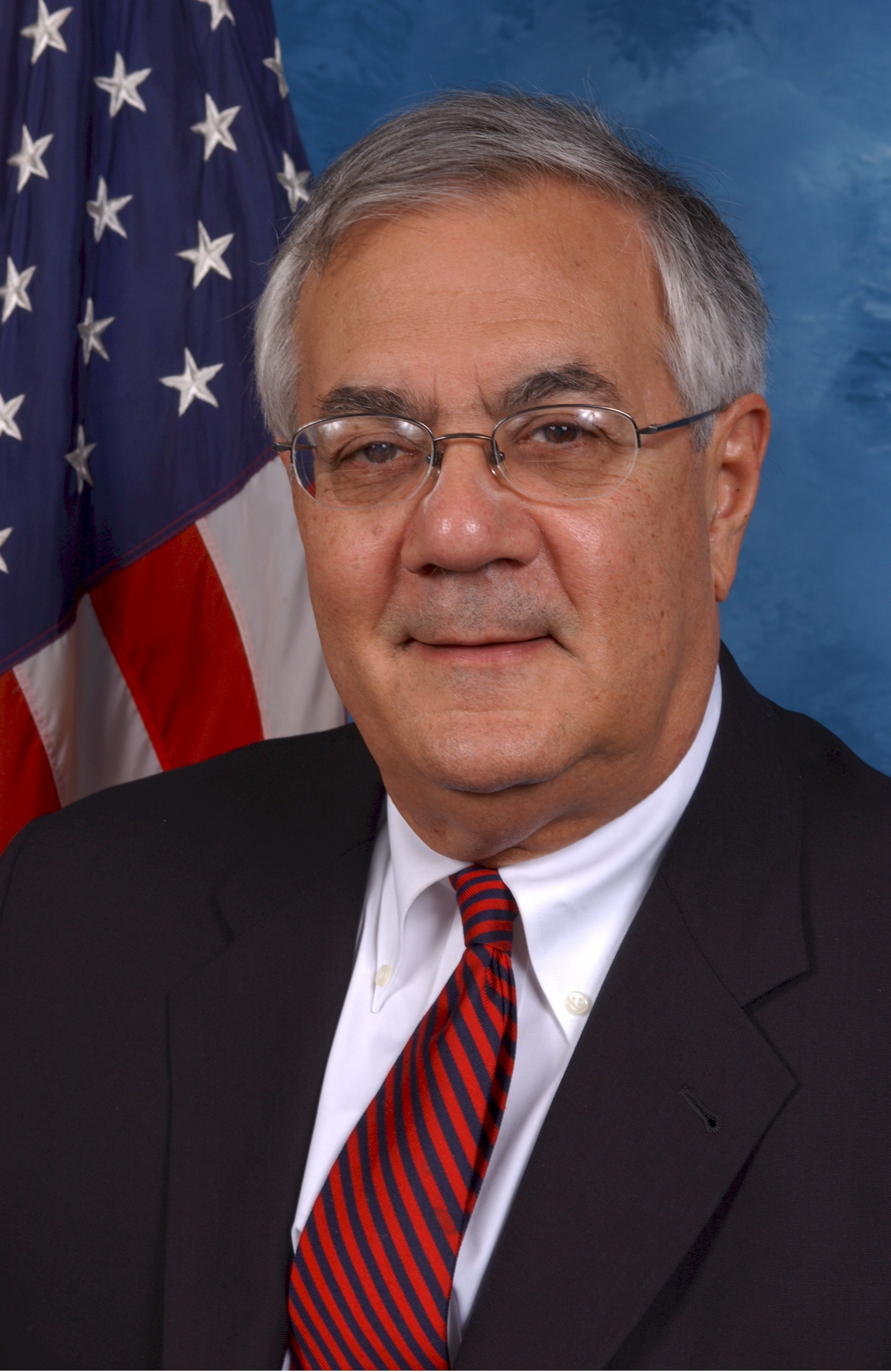
Barney Frank

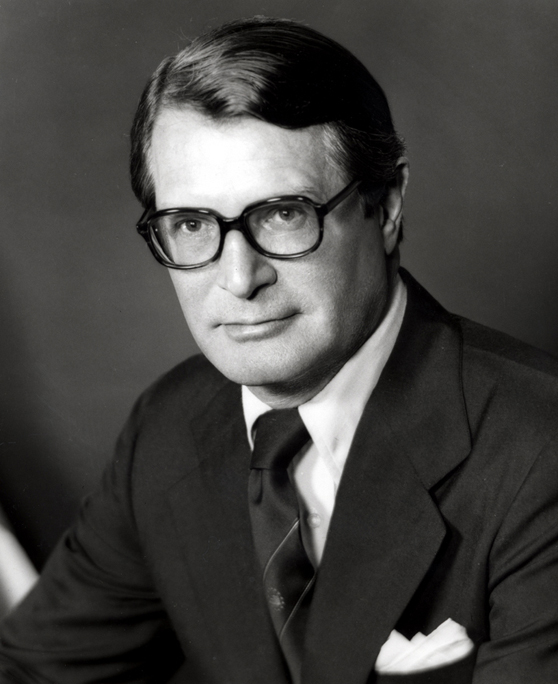
Elliot Richardson

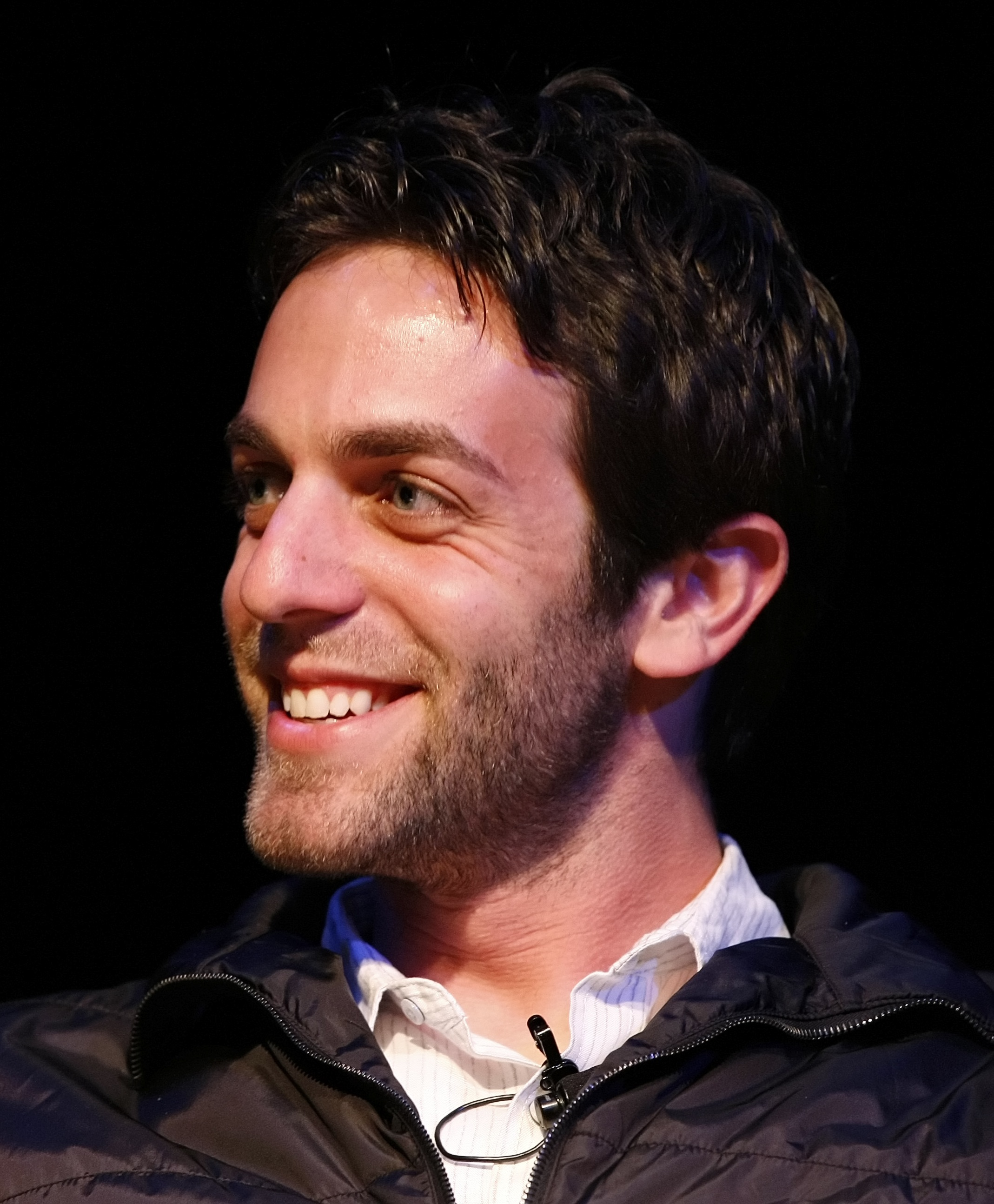
B. J. Novak

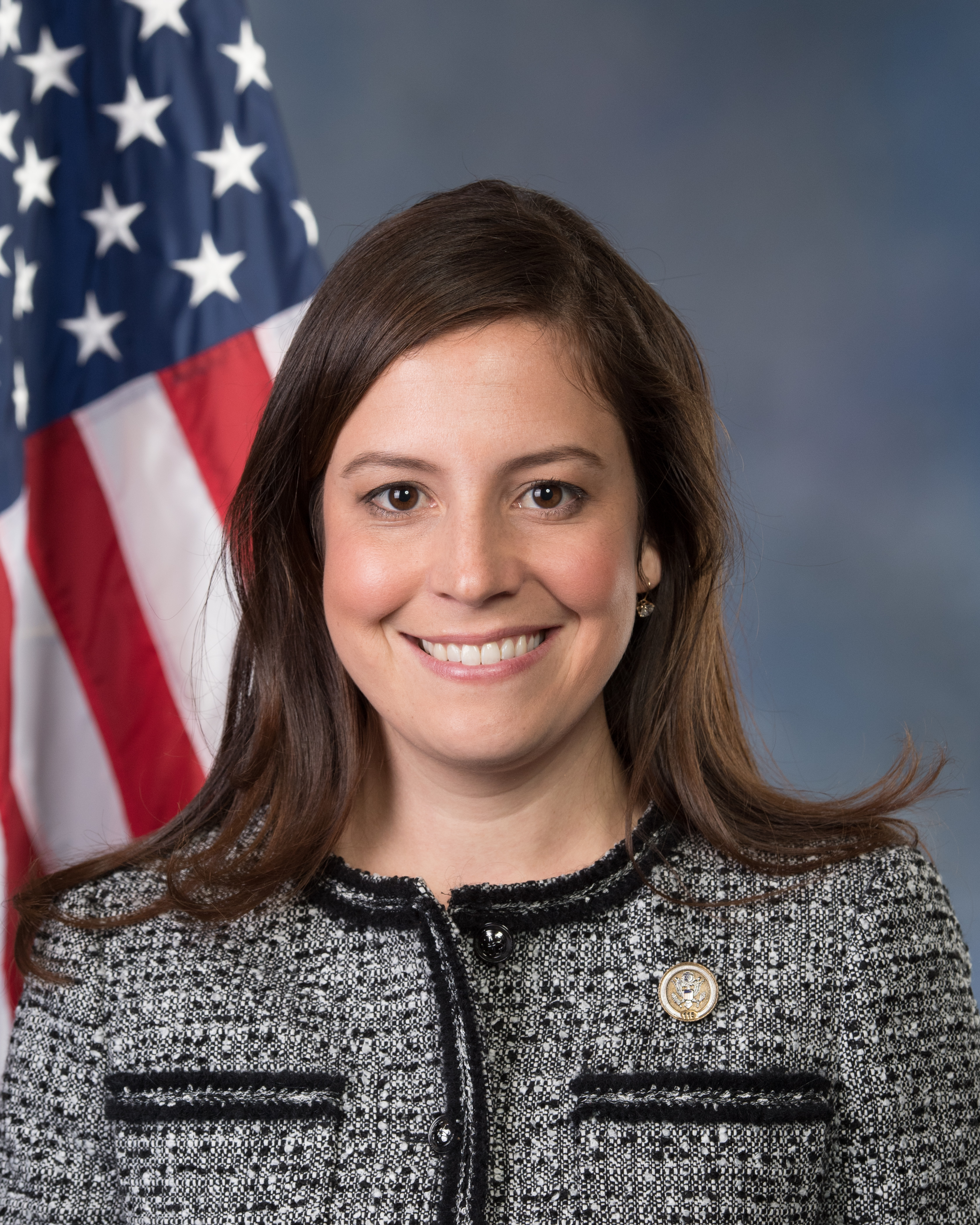
Elise Stefanik

Other notable Winthrop alumni include Amy Zegart, Alan Keyes, Grover Norquist, Charles Nesson, Paul Thissen, and Alan "Scooter" Zackheim. During his freshman year, the nuclear weapons pioneer J. Robert Oppenheimer lived in Standish Hall. Author James von der Heydt served as Resident Dean of Winthrop House in 2006. Gabe Newell briefly lived in Winthrop House prior to leaving the university.
