= Ronald S. Sullivan Jr. =

Professor of Law at Harvard Law School

- Born: December 12, 1966 (age 58); Gary, Indiana, U.S.
- Education: Morehouse College (BA); Harvard University (JD)

Ronald S. Sullivan Jr. (born December 12, 1966, in Gary, Indiana) is a law professor at Harvard Law School. Sullivan graduated Phi Beta Kappa from Morehouse College in 1989 and received his Juris Doctor from Harvard Law School in 1994. Prior to joining the Harvard Law School faculty, Sullivan served as the director of the Public Defender Service for the District of Columbia.

Sullivan was elected president of the Black Law Students Association at Harvard Law School and served as a general editor of the Harvard Black Letter Law Journal, now known as the Harvard Journal on Racial and Ethnic Justice. Prior to joining the Harvard faculty, Sullivan worked at the D.C. law firms of Baach Robinson & Lewis and Skadden Arps Slate Meagher & Flom, where Sullivan quickly gained experience with high-profile cases, such as those involving President Clinton.

== Career ==
=== Academic work ===
Sullivan began his teaching career at Yale Law School, where he won the law school's prestigious award for outstanding teaching. He was recruited by then-Dean Elena Kagan to become part of the Harvard Law School faculty. He teaches first year criminal law and upper level criminal procedure at Harvard Law School, where he is the director of the Criminal Justice Institute. He continues to write on the subjects of criminal law, criminal procedure, democracy, and race.

He was the Director of the Criminal Justice Institute at Harvard Law School, where he served as "a real live criminal defense lawyer for clients who can't afford one." Sullivan also oversees the January term Trial Advocacy Workshop, an intensive three-week course for Harvard Law School students, featuring assistance from high-profile lawyers and judges from around the country. Sullivan is also a founding fellow, along with his wife, of the Jamestown Project, is actively involved with community organizations in the Massachusetts area, and regularly gives speeches and moderates panels on race-based violence. Sullivan also now serves as the official faculty advisor for Harvard Law School's chapter of the Black Law Students Association.

From July 1, 2009, to June 30, 2019, Sullivan and his wife, Harvard Law School instructor Stephanie Robinson, served as Faculty Deans of Winthrop House at Harvard College, where they lived with their two young sons and were known as the first black Faculty Deans in the history of the college.

=== Legal work ===
On June 9, 2016, it was announced, and confirmed by news outlets such as The Boston Globe, that Sullivan would be part of the head legal defense team for ex-NFL New England Patriots football star player Aaron Hernandez in a double murder case. While Hernandez was serving a prison sentence for another murder, of which he had been convicted, he was found not guilty in the double murder case.

=== Defense of Harvey Weinstein ===
On January 23, 2019, it was announced, and confirmed by news outlets such as CNN, that Sullivan, with Jose Baez and Duncan Levin had joined the legal defense team of Harvey Weinstein, a movie mogul facing multiple charges of rape and other sexual assault. Sullivan's decision met with criticism from Harvard University students, faculty, and administrators, including an online petition by students seeking the removal of Sullivan as Faculty Dean of Winthrop House. A letter supporting Sullivan, signed by 52 Harvard Law School professors, appeared in The Boston Globe on March 8, 2019.

Following the aforementioned criticism, as well as subsequent allegations by Winthrop House students, tutors, and staff of a toxic environment under Sullivan and Robinson stretching back to 2016, the Dean of Harvard College, Rakesh Khurana, announced on May 11, 2019, that he would not renew the appointments of Sullivan and Robinson as Faculty Deans when their appointments expired on June 30, 2019. That week Sullivan announced he would step down from Weinstein's defense team. Sullivan later published an op-ed about the experience in The New York Times.

== Personal life ==
Sullivan supported fellow Harvard Law School alumnus Barack Obama in the 2008 presidential election where he chaired then-Senator Obama's Criminal Justice Policy Group. Fellow Harvard Law School professor and Obama supporter Charles Ogletree mentored Sullivan when Sullivan was a law school student.

On November 19, 2019, the United States Tax Court ruled that he owed over $1 million in unpaid taxes, and had not filed income tax returns between 2005 and 2013. The amount, which Sullivan had been disputing, was mainly attributed to the sale of his former home in 2013.
