= William Husel =

American physician

- Born: William Scott Husel; November 11, 1975 (age 51)
- Other name: Billy Husel
- Occupation: Physician

Details
- Country: United States
- State: Ohio

William Scott Husel is an American intensive/critical care physician who was charged (and later acquitted) for 14 counts of murder relating to the deaths of multiple patients from his care of terminally ill patients at Mount Carmel West and St. Ann's Hospitals in Columbus, Ohio. There were originally 25 charges which was reduced by the court for the sake of time. The prosecution in this case argued that Dr. Husel hastened the death of critically ill patients. He turned himself in on June 5, 2019. After an extensive trial, Husel was acquitted on all counts on April 20, 2022.

== Life history ==
William Scott Husel was born on November 11, 1975. Raised in Cleveland, Ohio, Husel attended St. Ignatius High School where he excelled in basketball as a captain for his senior year. Graduating in 1994, he attended Wheeling Jesuit College.

In the mid-1990s, Husel continued his education at Ohio State University, graduating with a degree in microbiology in 2000. Husel then attended and graduated from Ohio University College of Osteopathic Medicine in 2008. Having completed his residency and fellowship in critical care medicine from the Cleveland Clinic (2013), Husel found work as an intensive-care doctor at the Mount Carmel West Hospital in Columbus, Ohio, where he was described as highly intelligent. In February 2015, Husel began to prescribe large doses of fentanyl to his patients during terminal extubation while his colleagues chose a different opioid analgesic (morphine sulfate). In October 2017, he married wife Mariah Baird, a registered nurse.

== Hospital deaths ==
From February 2015 to November 2018, Husel was alleged to have prescribed excessive amounts of fentanyl to his patients. The first alleged murder was said to have begun on February 10, 2015, when a patient was administered 400 micrograms of fentanyl. Over the course of two and a half years, 34 deaths of patients occurred. Mount Carmel Health System accused Husel of all 34, though 6 of the deaths were not believed to be a result of Husel's prescribing by authorities.

On October 25, 2018, Mount Carmel received their first formal report of Husel's conduct. It was not investigated seriously until November 19, 2018, when they broadened their investigation, noting the death of Rebecca Walls and an abnormally high dosage of fentanyl. One day later, another patient of Husel's named Melissa Penix had been declared deceased after a high dosage; Husel was immediately removed from patient-care duties on November 21, 2018, before being fired on December 5, 2018, after he had been held under suspicion for poisoning patients. Mount Carmel then contacted the State Medical Board of Ohio, meeting with the Franklin County prosecutor on the same day. Informing the State of Ohio Board of Nursing, Ohio state police became involved with the case not long thereafter on January 15, 2019. After having his license suspended and being charged with 25 counts of murder, Husel turned himself in to authorities on June 5, 2019. A judge later agreed to dismiss 11 of the murder counts. (Note: Must be noted that all of these patients were terminally ill on life-support and the controversy is over how to handle medication management of a dying patient (palliative care).)

== Trial ==
Husel's trial began February 22, 2022. In her opening statement, Assistant Franklin County Prosecutor Janet Grubb told the jury that Husel prescribed "unwarranted and unprecedented" dosages of fentanyl, more than was medically necessary to ease pain, and that his actions caused the patients' deaths. Husel's defense attorney Jose Baez said in his opening statement that Husel prescribed the fentanyl in an effort to relieve his patients from pain and that he did not commit murder. Baez also showed the jury part of a media playbook Mount Carmel Health System had created for handling the scandal, including a page discussing who the "villain" would be. After opening statements, prosecutors called their first witness, Columbus police detective Bill Gillette. The State's second witness, pharmacist Talon Schroyer—who had previously worked the night shift at Mount Carmel—testified on February 23 that he thought Husel's fentanyl orders were “unusual” but was unsure if they might be a result of possible drug diversion. Shroyer stated that Husel explained he was “doing a procedure” when Shroyer asked him about the 1,000 mcg dosage prescribed to patient Janet Kavanaugh. During cross-examination of Schroyer, defense attorney Diane Menashe argued that Husel had saved the lives of several of the alleged murder victims by providing lifesaving interventions (such as CPR and medications like vasopressors).

On February 28, jurors heard from E. Wesley Ely, a physician and Vanderbilt University professor. Ely, who specializes in pulmonary and critical care medicine, testified about each of the 14 patients Husel was accused of murdering. According to Ely, each of those patients could have died as a direct result of the medication Husel ordered for them and not (directly) from their underlying health conditions. Ely further stated that Husel's dosing was "astounding," "mind-boggling" and "out of the norm." This testimony was contradicted by Joel Zivot (also a critical care physician) later in the trial. On March 1, John “Sean” O’Connell, the former director of pharmacy of Mount Carmel West testified, followed by Mount Carmel pulmonary and critical care physician Gina Moody and Deborah Woidtke, a hospitalist specializing in internal medicine who was contracted by Mount Carmel through Columbus Inpatient Care. On March 2, jurors heard from former Mount Carmel West Vice President Larry Swanner and Dan Roth, chief clinical officer of Trinity Health. Ely returned on March 10. On March 3, Judge Michael Holbrook denied the defense's motion for a mistrial. That same day, Judge Holbrook dismissed the jury until Monday, March 7. Prosecutors and defense attorneys argued about whether certain testimony relied on privileged information. On March 4, Judge Holbrook ruled that Larry Swanner would be recalled to clarify some of his testimony—specifically what report he relied on to conclude that Husel was the only doctor in the health system ordering fentanyl doses of 500 micrograms and above. On March 7 and 8, there was testimony from David Ralston (former director of the ICU at Mt. Carmel) and from hospitalist physicians employed by Columbus Inpatient Care. Additionally, the Chief Forensics Toxicologist at the Franklin County Coroners Office testified.

From March 9 through March 17, and on March 24 and March 28, jurors heard from several Mount Carmel at-the-time-current and former employees—including those who had worked as nurses and hospitalists. On March 15, March 17, March 21, March 24, March 28, and March 29, jurors heard testimony from family members of Husel's alleged victims. On March 21 through March 23, John Walther Schweiger, a Tampa anesthesiologist and critical care physician, testified as an expert witness for the prosecution. On March 29, prosecutors rested their case in chief after calling 53 witnesses.

On March 30, the defense called anesthesiology and intensive care specialist Joel Zivot as a witness. Zivot testified that the drugs administered by Husel were intended and indeed ordered for comfort care at end of life. Prosecutors objected to Zivot's testimony because he acknowledged that he had spoken to Husel as part of his review of the medical records, which is barred by Ohio evidence rules. Zivot testified that he believed all 14 patients Husel is accused of murdering had died from illnesses and underlying medical conditions rather than the fentanyl Husel had ordered for them. The defense then rested, having called no further witnesses. Prosecutors did not call any rebuttal witnesses. Closing arguments were scheduled for Monday, April 4 and were then scheduled for Wednesday, April 6 and then for Thursday, April 7. Closing arguments occurred on Monday, April 11.

On April 7, an affidavit of disqualification was filed with the Ohio Supreme Court, along with a motion to seal it. The affidavit sought to have Judge Michael Holbrook removed from the case. The request was denied.

During closing arguments, Assistant Franklin County Prosecutor David Zeyen said that Husel intended to hasten or cause the deaths of 14 patients and that it did not matter if they were already ill or close to death. He further argued that Husel's late-night shift gave him a cover to order excessive amounts of fentanyl. Nurses under Husel, Zeyen said, were "enthralled" to be working with someone like him, who completed a residency at the prestigious Cleveland Clinic. During the defense's closing argument, Baez claimed that prosecutors had selectively presented certain details that were helpful to their case and withheld details that were favorable to Husel. He reiterated that Husel was a well liked and respected physician by his colleagues. Baez also argued that the patients Husel is accused of murdering died from being taken off ventilators, rather than from fentanyl he had prescribed.

Jury deliberations began on April 12. On April 18, jurors said they were at an impasse. Judge Michael Holbrook ordered them to continue working to reach a verdict.

On April 20, 2022, the jury found Husel not guilty on all charges.

=== Post Trial ===
Husel chose to surrender his medical license in the State of Ohio. His medical license was officially revoked on May 5, 2022.
