= Joel Zivot =

Canadian anesthesiologist

- Education: University of Manitoba (MD); Emory University (MA, law)
- Medical career
- Profession: Physician
- Field: Anesthesiology, critical care medicine
- Institutions: Emory University School of Medicine

Joel B. Zivot is a Canadian anesthesiologist and critical care physician. He is an associate professor of anesthesiology and surgery at the Emory University School of Medicine in Atlanta. Zivot has testified as a medical expert for defendants in American death penalty cases and has studied pulmonary edema in prisoners executed by lethal injection. He has also argued against assisted dying in Canada and the United Kingdom.

== Early life and education ==
Zivot grew up in Canada and began practicing medicine there before moving to Atlanta. He received his medical degree from the University of Manitoba, completed a residency in anesthesiology at the University of Toronto in 1993, and completed a fellowship in critical care medicine at the Cleveland Clinic. He later earned a master's degree in bioethics and a law degree from Emory University.

== Career ==
Zivot is an associate professor in the departments of anesthesiology and surgery at Emory. He was previously medical director of the cardiothoracic and vascular intensive care unit at Emory University Hospital.

=== Lethal injection ===
Zivot became interested in lethal injection after a shortage of sodium thiopental in 2011, when Hospira withdrew the drug amid concerns about its use in executions. In 2013 he wrote in USA Today calling for a moratorium on the use of anesthetic drugs in executions.

In 2016 Zivot and Emory pathologist Mark Edgar reviewed autopsy reports of executed prisoners and found pulmonary edema in about three quarters of them. Their findings were presented in federal courts in Georgia, Arkansas, Missouri, Tennessee and Ohio. In 2019 a federal magistrate judge in Ohio found that midazolam was very likely to cause severe pain during executions, and Governor Mike DeWine later paused executions in the state.

Zivot was the medical expert for Missouri prisoner Russell Bucklew, who argued that his cavernous hemangioma would make lethal injection unusually painful. The Supreme Court ruled against Bucklew in Bucklew v. Precythe (2019). In 2022 Zivot examined Alabama prisoner Kenneth Eugene Smith after a failed execution attempt, and in 2023 he submitted a complaint to a United Nations special rapporteur before Smith became the first person executed by nitrogen hypoxia.

Zivot was also retained by lawyers for Christa Pike, the only woman on death row in Tennessee. After the state's attempt to execute her failed on September 30, 2026, he wrote in The New York Times that he had warned that her veins made a failed execution more likely.

=== Husel trial ===
In 2022 Zivot was the only defense witness at the murder trial of William Husel, an Ohio intensive care physician charged with killing 14 patients with fentanyl. He testified that the patients died of their illnesses. Husel was acquitted on all counts.

=== Assisted dying ===
In February 2021 Zivot testified before the Canadian Senate on Bill C-7, which expanded medical assistance in dying. He argued that the drugs used were similar to those used in lethal injection and were likely to cause painful deaths. He said he had never provided or observed the procedure, and physicians who provide it disputed his comparison. In October 2021 he wrote in The Spectator against a separate proposal in the United Kingdom, the Assisted Dying Bill, a private member's bill introduced in the House of Lords by Baroness Meacher that would have allowed terminally ill adults in England and Wales with six months or less to live to request help ending their lives.
