= Killing of Victoria Martens =

2016 homicide case in New Mexico, US

- Victoria Martens
- Date: August 23, 2016; 10 years ago
- Location: Albuquerque, New Mexico, U.S.
- Type: Homicide
- Burial: October 29, 2016; Albuquerque, New Mexico
- Suspects: Michelle Martens; Fabian Gonzales; Jessica Kelley; John Doe
- Charges: First-degree murder, child abuse, kidnapping, tampering with evidence, contributing to the delinquency of a minor
- Trial: 2022
- Verdict: Guilty plea bargain accepted by Michelle Martens on June 29, 2018. Jessica Kelly accepted plea deal in 2019. Fabian Gonzales went to trial, found guilty.
- Sentence: Fabian Gonzales sentenced to 37.5 years on October 27, 2022. Jessica Kelley sentenced to 44 years on April 29, 2022. Michelle Martens sentenced to 12 years.

On August 24, 2016, the body of 10-year-old Victoria Martens (August 23, 2006 – August 23, 2016) was found in an apartment building in Albuquerque, New Mexico, United States. After responding to a 9-1-1 call regarding a domestic dispute, officers discovered Martens' dismembered remains partially wrapped in a burning blanket in her mother's apartment. The victim's mother, 35-year-old Michelle Martens; her boyfriend, 31-year-old Fabian Gonzales; and Gonzales' cousin, 31-year-old Jessica Kelley, were arrested at the scene and charged with first-degree murder, child abuse resulting in grievous bodily harm or death, kidnapping, tampering with evidence, and contributing to the delinquency of a minor. All three suspects pled not guilty in the state's court. On June 29, 2018, Michelle Martens pled guilty to one count of child abuse resulting in death. The same day, the Albuquerque Police Department announced a fourth unidentified male suspect was being sought in connection to the case based on DNA evidence recovered from the scene.

== Background ==
Victoria Martens was born on August 23, 2006, in Albuquerque, New Mexico. She was a student at Petroglyph Elementary School in Albuquerque. Her mother, Michelle Martens, did not have a criminal record in New Mexico, but later told investigators she would seek men online to engage in sexual acts with her two children, including Victoria, while she allegedly watched for pleasure. The New Mexico Children, Youth, and Families Department (CYFD), located in the state capital, Santa Fe, had previously received five phone calls regarding the Martens' household, mostly from Michelle Martens herself, beginning in 2015. Michelle Martens allegedly met Fabian Gonzales on an internet dating service, Plenty Of Fish, about a month prior to the killing. Jessica Kelley had been released from prison only four days before the murder.

== Circumstances of death ==
According to investigators, witnesses saw Jessica Kelley carrying Victoria Martens to the apartment at around 10 p.m. MDT on August 23. Later that night, neighbors reported screaming in the apartment. Shortly after, at approximately 4:30 a.m. on August 24, Michelle Martens and Fabian Gonzales left the apartment and told neighbors that Kelley attacked them with an iron. After responding to the 911 call, police entered the second-story apartment and saw smoke coming from behind the closed bathroom door. Upon opening the door, the officers discovered Martens' dismembered body partially wrapped in a burning blanket. She was pronounced dead at the scene. An autopsy revealed she had been sexually assaulted, strangled to death, then stabbed, and dismembered. Her body was then set on fire. Martens had been given alcohol and methamphetamine before death, according to her mother, "to calm her down so [Fabian Gonzales and Jessica Kelley] could have sex with her", though she later recanted this statement. However, later reports suggested that drugs were not found in her system. Investigators determined Victoria Martens died between 7:45 and 8:30 p.m. on August 23, her 10th birthday.

== Investigation and trials ==
Michelle Martens, Fabian Gonzales, and Jessica Kelley were arrested and charged with the murder of Victoria Martens. The three suspects were held on a USD$1 million cash-only bond. Martens, Gonzales, and Kelley were arraigned on September 16, 2016. Initially co-defendants, prosecutors asked the court to try Martens, Gonzales, and Kelley in separate criminal trials. The motion was granted in June 2017. They each pled not guilty. On August 14, 2017, Judge Charles Brown decided that Michelle Martens would be tried first on July 30, 2018. Gonzales would be second in October 2018 and then Kelley would go on trial in January 2019. The trials of Gonzales and Kelley were postponed until 2022.

On June 29, 2018, Bernalillo County District Attorney Raúl Torrez announced that Michelle Martens accepted a plea bargain to one count of child abuse resulting in death. Torrez said in a press conference that most of the details regarding the case were "simply not true." During the conference, the Albuquerque Police Department announced that a fourth unidentified male suspect was sought in relation to the death of Victoria Martens based on unknown DNA evidence recovered from the scene.

Torrez said cell phone data proves Martens and Gonzales were not present when the murder and rape occurred. Subsequently, Torrez announced nine of the charges against Fabian Gonzales including second-degree murder and criminal sexual penetration were dropped. Gonzales faced a series of charges including child abuse resulting in death and tampering with evidence of which he was found guilty. Michelle Martens is believed to have falsely confessed to actively participating in the murder. Martens was sentenced to 12 years in prison, but was released from prison on October 14, 2025, according to local news outlets such as KOB, KRQE and KOAT.

Fabian Gonzales was the only one of the three who faced trial. He was found guilty of reckless child abuse, tampering with evidence, and conspiracy to tamper with evidence in 2022. He was sentenced to 37.5 years in prison, and will be eligible for parole after serving half that sentence.

Jessica Kelley agreed to testify in Gonzales' trial as part of a plea deal that was struck in early 2019, where she pled guilty to several charges including reckless child abuse resulting in death. In April 2022, Kelley was sentenced to 44 years in prison, however, Kelley is expected to serve less than half of her sentence.

=== Internal investigation of the Albuquerque Police Department ===
On August 4, 2017, the Albuquerque Journal reported that an investigation by the Civilian Police Oversight Agency (CPOA) found that a spokesperson from the Albuquerque Police Department "did lie" to the newspaper about the police department's response to a CYFD referral concerning Victoria Martens prior to her death. (Note: The referral in question was regarding an anonymous phone tip received by the New Mexico Children, Youth and Families Department (CYFD) in March 2016 about potential child sexual abuse.) In December 2016, a sergeant and a commander of the Crimes Against Children Unit told police command staff, including Chief of Police Gorden Eden and a department spokesman officer, that the Albuquerque Police had received referrals from the CYFD about Martens but did not investigate.

In late January 2017, two police spokespersons told the Albuquerque Journal that officers did investigate the referrals and stated that interviews with Victoria Martens and her mother had been conducted; however, this was revealed by the investigation to be false. In July 2017, the CPOA investigation discovered that one of the police spokespersons held correct information about the case but fabricated details in the January statements given to the Albuquerque Journal. Albuquerque's Citizen Police Oversight Agency voted for the officer, since removed from spokesperson duties, to be suspended for two weeks. However, Eden modified this to a one-day suspension arguing that there was no evidence the officer "intentionally lied". Due to the disagreement, the case will next be reviewed by an independent monitor overseeing the Albuquerque Police Department's reform.

== Reactions ==
Eden called Victoria Martens's killing "the most gruesome act of evil I have ever seen in my career". Governor Susana Martinez called for a federal investigation. Then-mayor, Richard J. Berry tweeted: "We are heartbroken as we mourn the murder of beautiful 10yr old Victoria Martens. Give your kids an extra hug tonight. #justiceForVictoria".

A birthday memorial was held for Victoria Martens on August 29, 2016. Two months later, on October 29, a public funeral was held for her.

In August 2017, Martens's maternal grandparents filed a wrongful death lawsuit in the 2nd District Court against the City of Albuquerque and several named police officers. The lawsuit alleged that their failure to investigate a report that one of Michelle Martens' boyfriends had tried to kiss Victoria was negligence that led to her murder, and that Albuquerque "had in effect policies, practices, and customs that condoned and fostered the unlawful conduct of the [Albuquerque Police Department] Individual Defendants, and were a direct and proximate cause" of Martens's death. The lawsuit sought policy changes and compensation for the Martens family. The case was dismissed in February 2021.

== See also ==
- Crime in New Mexico
- List of murdered American children
