= Operation Northern Lights (disambiguation) =

Operation Northern Lights was a United States operation during the Iraq War. It may also refer to:

- Operation Nordlicht (1942)
- Operation Nordlicht (1944–45)
