= Jose Baez (lawyer) =

American lawyer (born 1970)

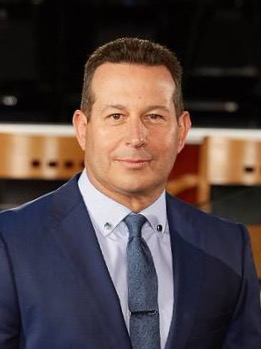
- Photograph of Baez
- Born: Jose Angel Baez; September 17, 1970 (age 56); New York City, U.S.
- Education: Miami-Dade Community College; Florida State University; St. Thomas University
- Occupation: Criminal defense lawyer
- Known for: Legal representation of Casey Anthony and Aaron Hernandez
- Military career
- Branch: United States Navy
- Service years: 1986–1989
- Website: baezlawfirm.com

Jose Angel Baez (born September 17, 1970) is an American criminal defense lawyer and author. He is known for representing high-profile defendants such as Casey Anthony, Aaron Hernandez, Mark Nordlicht, Harvey Weinstein, and Charlie Javice.

== Early life and education ==
Baez was born to Puerto Rican parents in Manhattan, New York City, and raised in the Bronx and South Florida with his three sisters by his single mother. He attended Homestead High School in Florida, but dropped out in the ninth grade. He married and became a father at age 17. After earning his General Equivalency Diploma (GED), he joined the US Navy in 1986. He spent three years assigned in connection with NATO at Norfolk, Virginia, trained as an intelligence analyst, and held a Top Secret security clearance.

After leaving the navy in 1989, Baez attended Miami-Dade Community College, then transferred to Florida State University where he earned a Bachelor of Arts. He earned his Juris Doctor degree from St. Thomas University School of Law in 1997.

== Career ==
=== Criminal cases ===
After being granted his license, he focused primarily on criminal defense cases, including the case of Elvira García, an undocumented Mexican immigrant accused of kidnapping a child that she had adopted as her own. García's charges were dropped, as it turned out to be more of a civil custody matter. He also tried the first-degree murder case of Nilton Díaz, heavily covered by the media in Orlando and Puerto Rico because the victim was the two-year-old granddaughter of World Boxing Champion Wilfredo Vazquez. Baez's client was acquitted of first and second degree murder but convicted of manslaughter and child abuse.

=== Casey Anthony case ===
Baez came to significant national attention when he took on the case of Casey Anthony. Time magazine dubbed it "the Social Media Trial of the Century". Anthony was acquitted of the murder of her daughter, Caylee, after a trial that lasted six weeks. In a press conference on the day of the verdict, Baez said, "While we're happy for Casey, there are no winners in this case. Caylee has passed on far, far too soon, and what my driving force has been for the last three years has been always to make sure that there has been justice for Caylee and Casey because Casey did not murder Caylee. It's that simple." He added, "And today our system of justice has not dishonored her memory by a false conviction." Baez was featured on every major news network and show across the country. Baez authored a book with Peter Golenbock about the Anthony Case, Presumed Guilty, which was published on July 3, 2012, and became a New York Times Best Seller. Fox News Channel commentator Geraldo Rivera referred to Baez as "Juanie Cochran", in reference to Johnnie Cochran, who had developed a similar reputation as a defense attorney for spearheading the acquittal of O. J. Simpson during his trial for the murders of Nicole Brown and Ron Goldman.

=== Missing in Aruba ===
After representing Anthony, Baez was brought on to assist attorney Chris Lejuez in representing millionaire businessman Gary Giordano in Aruba. Giordano was detained in KIA Prison for 116 days in connection with the disappearance of Robyn Gardner. Aruba's High Court released Gary Giordano on November 28, 2011. No charges were ever filed against Gary Giordano. Baez and Lejuez successfully defended an appeal filed by Aruba's Chief Prosecutor, Taco Stein.

Baez defended Giordano on the American reality prime time court show You the Jury, which was canceled after two episodes. Baez also defended Gerod Roth in the show.

=== Rebecca Sedwick ===
In October 2013, Baez was hired to defend the 12‑year-old suspect arrested in connection with the death of 12‑year-old Rebecca Ann Sedwick, whose mother had claimed was bullied to the point where she committed suicide by jumping to her death from a silo in a cement factory.

The case made national news when Polk County, Florida, Sheriff Grady Judd made the first arrest in the country for cyberbullying, and gave interviews on all major media shows including the Today Show and Good Morning America. Baez criticized Sheriff Judd for releasing the juveniles' names and photographs, setting off a battle between the sheriff and defense attorney. Sheriff Judd told the media that Baez, "a flashy lawyer from out of town, should go work out a plea deal." In the end, all charges against his client were dropped. After winning the case, Baez told Sheriff Judd that "He should get a lawyer and a darn good one because he's gonna need it", insinuating his client might sue the Sheriff. No known further legal action occurred.

=== Aaron Hernandez ===
Baez was working with former NFL player Aaron Hernandez to appeal his conviction for the murder of Odin Lloyd up until Hernández's apparent suicide on April 19, 2017. Baez stated publicly he does not believe Hernandez committed suicide and is "determined to find the truth surrounding his untimely death" as "Aaron was looking forward to an opportunity for a second chance to prove his innocence."

Baez defended Aaron Hernandez on charges related to a 2012 Boston double homicide of Daniel de Abreu and Safiro Furtado in a drive-by shooting in Boston's South End on July 16, 2012. On April 14, 2017, a jury acquitted Hernandez of the murders. Hernandez was already serving a life term without parole for the Odin Lloyd killing. Five days after the not-guilty verdict, Hernandez committed suicide by hanging himself in his prison cell.

==== Lawsuit against NFL and New England Patriots ====
On September 21, 2017, Baez announced Aaron Hernandez had been diagnosed with chronic traumatic encephalopathy by Dr. Ann McKee of Boston University, and that he had filed a federal lawsuit, on behalf of Hernandez's daughter, against the National Football League and the New England Patriots, seeking unspecified damages for loss of parental support. The suit alleges the league and team were aware of the dangers of repeated head injuries and refused to disclose these to Hernandez.

=== Mark Nordlicht ===
In the summer of 2019, Baez, along with Ronald Sullivan and Duncan Levin represented Mark Nordlicht, the CIO of the billion-dollar hedge fund, Platinum Partners. Nordlicht was charged with securities fraud, investment adviser fraud, and multiple counts of conspiracy. The government alleged that Nordlicht, along with others, engaged in one of the largest "Ponzi-esque" schemes in history. Nordlicht was convicted by a jury on three counts of conspiracy and securities fraud. The presiding judge Brian Cogan, ruled that the government had no basis for prosecuting those charges and granted the defendants an acquittal, and a retrial if the acquittal was vacated. The 2nd Circuit Court of Appeals vacated Cogan's ruling by a 3-0 judgment and reinstated the jury conviction. Further appeal was denied by the US Supreme Court.

=== William Husel ===
William Scott Husel was charged with 14 counts of first degree murder. He allegedly prescribed excessive amounts of fentanyl to his patients. Baez claimed that Husel was simply trying to help his patients deal with the pain, and said that Husel did not intend to kill any of his victims. According to Baez, Husel was trying to help some patients in their last hours of life. Husel was found not guilty.

=== Representation of Harvey Weinstein ===
In early 2019, Baez was sought out by Harvey Weinstein, former co-founder of Miramax, to represent him in the New York criminal case where Weinstein was accused of rape and other sexual offenses. Baez, with his team of Ronald Sullivan and Duncan Levin served on Weinstein's defense team until late 2019, later criticizing decisions made by other members of the defense. Weinstein was eventually convicted of several charges.

=== Representation of Charlie Javice ===
Baez represented Charlie Javice, founder of Frank, in the New York criminal case where she was accused of defrauding JPMorgan in the $175 million sale of the startup. Baez subsequently lost the case, as the jury in New York City returned a guilty verdict after a five-week trial.

== See also ==
- Cheney Mason – co-counsel for Casey Anthony
- Linda Drane Burdick – lead prosecutor on the Casey Anthony case
- Investigating Innocence – wrongful conviction advocacy; Baez is a founding member
