= Orange County Courthouse (Florida) =

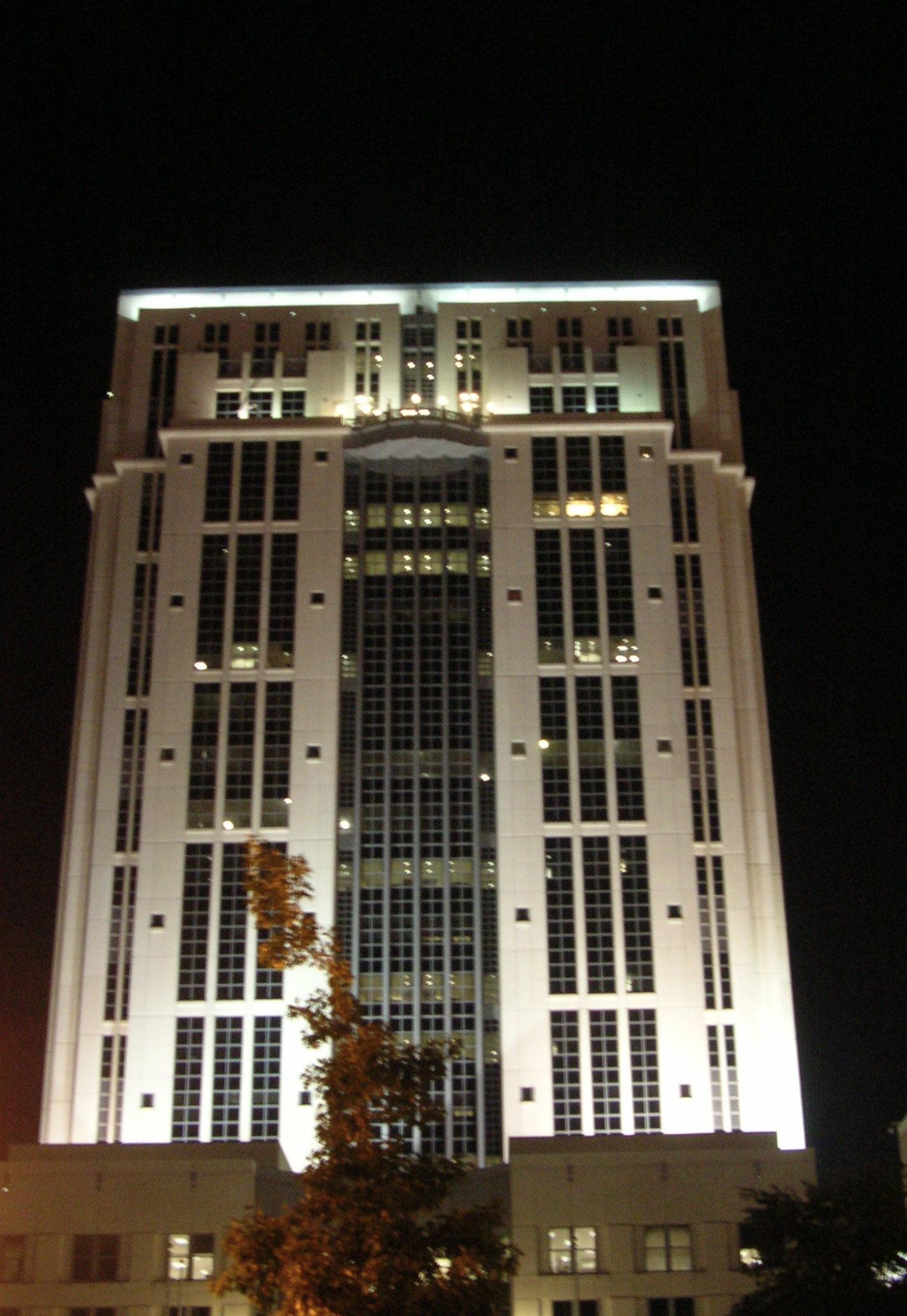
- Interactive map of the Orange County Courthouse area

General information
- Architectural style: Postmodern
- Location: 425 North Orange Avenue; Orlando, Florida, United States
- Coordinates: 28°32′53″N 81°22′45″W
- Completed: 1997
- Cost: $100 million
- Client: Orange County, Florida

Height
- Height: 416 ft (127 m)

Technical details
- Floor count: 24

Design and construction
- Architects: Michael LeBoeuf, HLM Design
- Main contractor: Morse Diesel International

The Orange County Courthouse, located in Orlando, Florida, United States, comprises the Ninth Judicial Circuit Court of Florida and its associated offices, including Orange County's county court. The courthouse complex includes a 23-level courthouse tower, two five-story office buildings for the State Attorney and Public Defender, and a 1,500 car parking facility." It is connected to other downtown points by the free Lymmo bus.
