= Mark Nordlicht =

American investment fund manager (born 1968)

- Born: Meir Nordlicht; 1968 (age 57–58)
- Education: B.A. Yeshiva University
- Occupation: Hedge fund manager
- Known for: Founder of Platinum Partners

Mark (Meir) Nordlicht (born 1968) is the founder and former chief investment officer of (now defunct) Platinum Partners, a U.S. based hedge fund, which came to be known for its investment strategies becoming the subject of a series of controversial and legal actions. In a high-profile case, Nordlicht asserted that government prosecutors leaked that he ran a “Ponzi scheme”, a notion rejected by the court. Nordlicht was convicted of securities fraud.

== Early life and education ==
Nordlicht was born to a Jewish family and raised on Long Island. He graduated from Yeshiva University in 1990 with a B.A. in philosophy. With $11,000 saved from his bar mitzvah he started trading commodity options.

== Platinum Partners ==
Platinum Partners was formed in 2003 in New York City with Nordlicht as chief investment officer. It portrayed itself as having a knack for illiquid investments and had $1.7 billion in assets in its most recent filing. The investor mix consisted of institutional investors, family offices and ultra-high-net individuals. Platinum Partners' purported $1.7 billion in assets sold for under $89 million in liquidation.

== Arrest ==
On December 19, 2016, federal agents arrested Nordlicht and six others on charges related to a $1 billion fraud that alleged that Nordlicht's firm operated "like a Ponzi scheme," according to prosecutors. The indictment charged Nordlicht and his co-defendants with eight counts of conspiracy to commit securities fraud, investment adviser fraud, securities fraud conspiracy, investment adviser fraud conspiracy, and wire fraud conspiracy for defrauding investors through overvaluation of assets, concealment of severe cash flow problems at Platinum, and the preferential payment of redemptions. Nordlicht's Platinum Partners management companies "projected stability and confidence" to current and prospective investors, reporting positive average returns of 17% from 2003 to 2015, according to a parallel civil lawsuit filed by the Securities and Exchange Commission. Included among the charges was manipulation of Black Elk Energy bonds.

Others charged in the SEC's complaint in addition to Nordlicht, Platinum Management (NY) LLC, and Platinum Credit Management LP:

- David Levy, owner and co-chief investment officer along with Nordlicht.
- Daniel Small, former managing director and portfolio manager of certain Platinum funds.
- Uri Landesman, former managing general partner of certain Platinum funds.
- Joseph Mann, who worked in Platinum Management’s investor relations department.
- Joseph SanFilippo, CFO of a Platinum hedge fund.
- Jeffrey Shulse, CFO of Black Elk Energy, the oil company used in the illicit $100 million scheme.

=== Ties to New York City correctional officers' union ===
The investigation of Platinum and Nordlicht was an outgrowth of a criminal case against Norman Seabrook, the head of the New York City correctional officers' union, who was alleged to have invested $20 million of the union's pension money in Platinum as part of a scheme in which he got kickbacks. Murray Huberfeld, an executive of Platinum, reportedly gave Seabrook bribes including a Ferragamo bag stuffed with $60,000 in cash to secure a $20 million pension investment. Seabrook was also to be paid a portion of the profits from the union's investment, which Huberfeld estimated would be between $100,000 and $150,000 a year, according to the government. After a hung jury in his first trial, Seabrook was found guilty of bribery and conspiracy at a second trial in August 2018, and as a result of the ongoing case that forced Platinum to close, the correction officers' union pension fund lost $19 million of its investment. Seabrook was sentenced to 58 months in prison on February 8, 2019.

== Leaks in the media ==
Lawyers for Nordlicht argued in court and in a letter dated April 7, 2017 that an FBI agent may have leaked information about the investigation to the press before it became public. The letter cited news articles in Bloomberg, the Wall Street Journal and the New York Post published in the summer of 2016 reporting that Platinum was under investigation.

Nordlicht's lawyers further argued that the leaks, and not the actions of Platinum's executives, may have been responsible for the damage to the value of Platinum's funds that caused harm to investors.

Reporter Ira Stoll of New Boston Post said of the case:

The more one looks into this, the more it looks like the Platinum Partners prosecution is just the latest in a mounting and troubling pattern of examples in which New York-area federal prosecutors and FBI agents have jailed hedge fund managers or destroyed their businesses with publicized raids — only to have the charges eventually overturned by judges or never brought at all.

It was later disclosed via a Freedom of Information Act request that Judge Cogan who heard the Platinum Partners case rejected the notion that a media leak actually occurred.

== Trial ==
Trial the case of United States v. Nordlicht, et al. began on April 23, 2019, before U.S. District Judge Brian Cogan. The jury trial spanned nine weeks as defendants Mark Nordlicht and to other platinum executives invoked various defenses unveiling unruly subject matter purported by the prosecution. The jury reached a mixed verdict on July 9, 2019. The jury rejected the prosecution's keystone argument purporting the Platinum Partners fund operated "like a Ponzi scheme," finding all defendants not guilty on those five subject charges unanimously. The jury did find two defendants guilty on three counts relating to conspiracy and securities fraud in transactions relating to bondholders of oil exploration company Black Elk. Platinum's former CFO, Joseph SanFilippo, was exonerated and acquitted of all charges in a unanimous not guilty verdict by the jury on every count.

Earlier in proceedings, the judge overseeing the case nixed the government's case as to the credibility of fraud claims, finding no clear anchor of fact or evidence limiting the government's scope in prosecution on the subject charges relating to fraudulent misrepresentation or falsely inflating asset values relating to the Platinum flagship fund. After the announcement of the jury's findings in verdict, presiding Judge Brian Cogan granted the defense a request for a special motion to vacate the lesser guilty verdicts. The defense was granted by order to file motions challenging all remaining charges pertaining to the charges coinciding with the jury's guilty verdicts. In a final statement, Hon. Cogan affirmed "It's not over yet," insinuating a likely re-examination of subject matter related to the Black Elk guilty charges.

On November 5, 2021, the 2nd U.S. Circuit Court of Appeals came to a 3–0 decision to vacate Judge Brian Cogan's decision thereby reinstating Mark Nordlicht's securities fraud and two conspiracy convictions.

On October 3, 2022, the Supreme Court upheld the decision of the 2nd U.S. Circuit Court of Appeals by denying to review a petition filed by Mark Nordlicht and David Levy.

At sentencing, Judge Cogan expressed disdain for the governments case stating "It’s not like stealing money. It’s not like Madoff or something like that.” Cogan noted that the original DOJ press release referred to a “$1.5 billion Ponzi scheme” for which the defendants “were not just acquitted, I mean it was a very weak case”. Judge Cogan proceeded to uphold Mr. Nordlicht's conviction sentencing him to six months of home confinement and probation.

== Philanthropy ==
Mark Nordlicht is a founder of the Westchester Torah Academy (WTA) donating substantial funds to the yeshiva. In June 2021, Mark Nordlicht gave a commencement speech to the first eighth grade class to graduate from WTA. The official sentencing memo contains dozens of testimonials from individuals and organizations that have benefited from Nordlicht’s charitable activities, highlighting his significant contributions to educational and religious institutions, as well as his support for underprivileged communities. The memo details his funding of AMIT, an organization focused on educating children in Israel, including the establishment of the AMIT Nordlicht Religious Technological High School in Jerusalem. Additionally, Nordlicht’s philanthropy extended to the Ethiopian immigrant community in Israel, where he supported the Or Me’Ofir preparatory school. His contributions were not limited to large institutions; numerous testimonials describe his anonymous support for scholarships and various foundations aimed at assisting individuals in need.

Unfortunately a number of Jewish charities lost significant sums of money with the collapse of Platinum Partners, the firm Mark Nordlicht founded and was CIO of.

== Personal life ==
Mark Nordlicht is married to Dahlia Kalter-Nordlicht and lives in New Rochelle.

In 2020, Mark Nordlicht filed for bankruptcy declaring personal assets of only $137,000 and liabilities in excess of $206 million.
