= Cheney Mason =

American attorney (born 1943)

- Born: December 12, 1943 (age 82); Jacksonville, Florida, U.S.
- Education: University of Florida (BA, 1968; JD, 1970)
- Occupation: Lawyer
- Employer(s): J. Cheney Mason, P.A.
- Known for: Co-counsel in the Casey Anthony trial
- Website: jcheneymason.com

James Cheney Mason (born December 12, 1943) is an American attorney best known as co-counsel for Casey Anthony in the 2011 Casey Anthony trial and counsel for Nelson Serrano in his 2006 murder trial.

== Early life and education ==
Cheney Mason is a graduate of the University of Florida, with a Bachelor of Arts achieved in 1968 and with a Juris Doctor earned in 1970.

== Career ==
Mason started his private law practice in Orlando, Florida, in 1971. He is a Board Certified Criminal Trial Lawyer, certified by both The Florida Bar and the National Board of Trial Advocacy.

Mason has written legal articles, and has lectured at the Florida State Bar, Fredric G. Levin College of Law, and other legal associations.

Mason has appeared on news media outlets including Dateline, Piers Morgan Tonight and HLN, providing expert commentary.

He is the author of Justice in America: How the Prosecutors and the Media Conspire Against the Accused, a book about Casey Anthony, published in August 2014.

Mason retired in 2022 after 51 years practicing law.

=== Honors and awards ===
Mason has received awards including the National Association of Criminal Defense Lawyers's Robert C. Heeney Memorial Award received in 2004.

=== Nelson Serrano trial ===
Mason represented Nelson Serrano in his murder trial. Serrano was convicted of premeditated murder in October 2006 and has been on death row since June 26, 2007.

During the trial, in an appearance on Dateline, Mason said he would pay $1 million to anyone who could make it from the Atlanta airport to a La Quinta Inn in 28 minutes - as his client was accused of doing. Dustin S. Kolodziej claimed he accepted the challenge, and made it in 19 minutes, and asked for the $1 million. When Mason refused to pay, Kolodziej sued. In January 2014, U.S. District Judge Charlene Edwards Honeywell ruled against Kolodziej, now an attorney, based on the issue that "Kolodziej was acting on edited comments by Florida lawyer James Cheney Mason that didn't reflect his true offer. As a result, there was no mutual assent."

=== Casey Anthony trial ===
Mason was hired as co-counsel to Casey Anthony's lead attorney, Jose Baez, in March 2010.

On June 30, 2011, the defense team for Casey Anthony rested. The jury began deliberations on July 4, 2011. On July 5, 2011, Anthony was acquitted of felony murder, aggravated child abuse, and manslaughter. She was found guilty on four misdemeanors of providing false information to police. For the four convictions of providing false information, she was sentenced to four years in county jail, but with credit for time served and good behavior she was released on July 17, 2011.

=== Rape lawsuit against Donald Trump and Jeffrey Epstein ===
On October 10, 2016, it was announced attorney Mason would represent a woman using the pseudonym "Jane Doe" in a case claiming that 2016 US Republican Party presidential nominee Donald Trump and financier Jeffrey Epstein raped her in 1994, when she was 13 years old. Judge Ronnie Abrams scheduled the first hearing for December 16, 2016. Epstein, Trump, and Jane Doe were also to discuss the possibility of settlement and possible trial length. Abrams asked for both sides to provide information to assist the court in advancing the case to settlement or trial. After citing repeated death threats, Jane Doe dismissed the lawsuit on November 4, 2016.
