= Legrome D. Davis =

American judge (born 1952)

Senior Judge of the United States District Court for the Eastern District of Pennsylvania
- Incumbent
- Assumed office September 28, 2017

Judge of the United States District Court for the Eastern District of Pennsylvania
- In office April 23, 2002 – September 28, 2017
- Appointed by: George W. Bush
- Preceded by: Edmund V. Ludwig
- Succeeded by: Karen S. Marston

Personal details
- Born: 1952 (age 73–74) Columbus, Ohio, U.S.
- Education: Princeton University (BA 1973); Rutgers University, Camden, New Jersey (JD 1976)

Legrome Derek Davis (born 1952) is an inactive senior United States district judge of the United States District Court for the Eastern District of Pennsylvania. Davis attended Princeton University and then Rutgers Law School. Most of his career as an attorney was spent in the office of the District Attorney of Philadelphia.

In 1987, Pennsylvania Governor Robert P. Casey Sr. nominated Davis to fill a position as a judge on Philadelphia's Court of Common Pleas, in Pennsylvania's First Judicial District, after a number of judges had lost their positions in a corruption scandal. Davis, among other Casey nominees, was chosen without consultation with Democratic Party leaders and his nomination was rejected in Pennsylvania's State Senate. Davis and four others, known as the "Casey Five", successfully ran for the Philadelphia judgeships later in 1987 with some significant endorsements, but with opposition from the city's Democratic party.

In 1998 and 1999, Davis was nominated by President Bill Clinton to serve as a district court judge of the United States District Court for the Eastern District of Pennsylvania. Although supported by Pennsylvania Senators Rick Santorum and Arlen Specter, both Republicans, Davis was not appointed in either of those instances. In 2002, again with the support of Specter and Santorum, Davis was nominated to the same federal judgeship by President George W. Bush, and was appointed as a United States district judge. He retired in 2017, and became a senior judge.

During his judicial career, Davis, a Democrat, was supported by both Democratic leaders (such as Clinton, Casey, Ed Rendell, and Wilson Goode) and Republican leaders (such as Bush, Santorum, Spector, and Ronald D. Castille). He was also viewed favorably as a judge by both prosecuting and defense attorneys.

== Early life and education ==
Davis was born in 1952, in Columbus, Ohio. Davis's father was a sergeant in the United States Air Force and while growing up Davis lived in Alaska, Texas, Massachusetts, Oklahoma, England, and Kansas. He received a Bachelor of Arts degree from Princeton University in 1973 and a Juris Doctor from Rutgers Law School, Camden, in 1976.

== Legal career ==
=== Lawyer ===
Davis was an assistant district attorney in Philadelphia from 1977 to 1980. He was hired by Ed Rendell, then the District Attorney of Philadelphia (D.A.) (later Pennsylvania's governor and chair of the Democratic National Committee). Davis left the D.A.'s office in 1980, and spent a year as an attorney for the Pennsylvania Crime Commission. He returned to the D.A.'s office as an assistant deputy district attorney from 1981 to 1987. During his time in the D.A.'s office, he was chief of the rape unit. After leaving the D.A.'s office a second time, Davis spent part of 1987 in the general counsel's office at the University of Pennsylvania. He was briefly in private practice in 1987, as an associate attorney with the Philadelphia law firm of Ballard, Spahr, Andrews & Ingersoll (now Ballard Spahr).

In 2002, Pennsylvania United States Senator Arlen Specter observed that Davis handled many complicated prosecutions for the district attorney's office. Davis was hired originally by then District Attorney of Philadelphia Ed Rendell to join the D.A.'s office. In 1998, Rendell observed that Davis "was a great trial lawyer and a great supervisor in the D.A.'s office".

=== Philadelphia Court of Common Pleas ===
In 1987, a number of judges were removed from Pennsylvania's First Judicial District in the Philadelphia Court of Common Pleas for corruption. Pennsylvania Governor Robert P. Casey, Sr. (a Democrat) nominated replacement judges to Pennsylvania's State Senate, including Davis. The senate did not accept three of Casey's nominations, including Davis, John W. Herron, and C. Darnell Jones, II. These three and two other Casey nominees (Mark I. Bernstein, and Edward R. Summers), later known as the "Casey Five", chose to run for judicial positions on Philadelphia's Court of Common Pleas later in 1987 (as Democrats). Casey had chosen Davis, Herron, and Jones without the input of any political party leaders; and though running as Democrats, the three were not endorsed by any political party in the election; all five were actively opposed by some Democratic party leaders, such as state senator Vincent Fumo; difficult obstacles to overcome in Philadelphia judicial elections. In addition to Casey, they did receive support from office holders Mayor Wilson Goode (a Democrat) and District Attorney Ronald D. Castille (a Republican), along with former District Attorney Ed Rendell who was running for mayor against Goode in Philadelphia's Democratic primary elections. Democratic city chairman Robert Brady unsuccessfully attempted to convince Goode to withdraw his endorsement, in favor of the candidates supported by Philadelphia's Democratic party. All of the "Casey Five" judges were elected.

Davis served as a judge on Philadelphia's Court of Common Pleas from 1987 to 2002, in that court's criminal division. During part of that time, he was the criminal division's supervising judge. In 1990, he developed and presided over an expedited felony disposition program known as the "rocket docket", with input from both prosectors in the D.A.'s office and criminal defense attorneys. This program reduced the court's backlog of felony cases by 34% by the end of the year. In 1996, Davis overturned the criminal convictions of 60 people who had been arrested for drug offenses and later convicted, based on the fabricated testimony and misconduct of a group of Philadelphia police officers who confessed to manufacturing evidence against innocent people as well as drug users, among other things.

In 1998, when Davis was being considered for a United States district court judgeship, then Philadelphia mayor Ed Rendell said of Davis, "He's smart. He's got a wonderful temperament. He's just a great choice". At the same time, highly positioned attorneys from both the Philadelphia D.A.'s office and the Defender Association of Philadelphia (public defenders) agreed that Davis would make an excellent federal judge; with the chief of the public defenders office, Ellen T. Greenlee, stating that Davis "'has the respect of everyone in the system'".

=== Federal judicial service ===
==== Expired nominations to district court under Clinton ====
Davis was nominated to serve as a United States district judge of the United States District Court for the Eastern District of Pennsylvania by President Bill Clinton on two occasions, July 30, 1998 and January 26, 1999. Each time, he was nominated to the seat vacated by Judge Edmund V. Ludwig, who assumed senior status on May 20, 1997. Both nominations lapsed.

==== Renomination to district court under Bush ====
On January 23, 2002, Davis was nominated by President George W. Bush to a seat on the United States District Court for the Eastern District of Pennsylvania vacated by Edmund V. Ludwig. Davis was confirmed by the United States Senate on April 18, 2002, and received commission on April 23, 2002. During the 2002 hearings on his confirmation, Davis was presented to the Senate Judiciary Committee by Pennsylvania Senator Rick Santorum. Santorum observed that although he was a Republican and Davis a Democrat, he considered Davis "an outstanding nominee and someone who I have been very, very strongly supportive of for several years", and that the administration of President George W. Bush was also "very enthusiastic" in supporting Davis's confirmation as a federal judge. Santorum also observed that he and Pennsylvania Senator Arlen Specter (also a Republican and strong Davis supporter), used a panel to review judicial candidates for federal judgeships, and Davis had the highest score of those undergoing that panel process at the time.

Davis assumed senior status on September 28, 2017. He was reported as being retired by at least April 2022. He has taught advanced trial advocacy in criminal cases at Drexel University's Thomas R. Kline School of Law.

Among the cases over which Davis presided as a federal judge was Langbord v. United States, a lengthy litigation involving a dispute over the ownership of ten 1933 double eagle $20 gold coins between the family in possession of the coins and the United States Government. Davis upheld the government's position that the coins were subject to forfeiture under a 1933 law, and was affirmed on appeal. Davis was chosen by the Judicial Panel on Multidistrict Litigation to preside over a complex multidistrict litigation case arising out of a 2015 Amtrak train derailment that led to eight deaths and over 200 injuries. In the early 2010s, he ruled in favor of the parents of autistic students in a class action against the School District of Philadelphia, in allowing parents to play a role in the placement of their children when those children were transferred from one school building to another (P.V., a minor, by and through his Parents, Pedro Valentin and Yolanda Cruz, individually, and on behalf of all others similarly situated, et al., v. The School District of Philadelphia et al.).

== Personal life ==
Davis's daughter Katherine Davis became a middle school and elementary school principal in Philadelphia, before being selected as the 15th president of the 186-year old Central High School in Philadelphia; the first woman and person of color to lead that school.

== See also ==
- List of African-American federal judges
- List of African-American jurists

Legal offices
Preceded by Edmund V. Ludwig	Judge of the United States District Court for the Eastern District of Pennsylvania; 2002–2017	Succeeded by Karen S. Marston
