= Brian P. Stern =

American judge

Associate Justice, Rhode Island Superior Court
- Incumbent
- Assumed office August 21, 2009
- Appointed by: Governor Donald L. Carcieri

Personal details
- Education: Clark University (B.A. 1988); Brooklyn Law School (J.D. 1991)

Brian P. Stern is an American judge who has been serving on the Rhode Island Superior Court since August 2009. Since 2011, he has been assigned to the Business Calendar, a business court program in the Superior Court, where he has rendered significant rulings and initiated the creation of a program to help businesses economically survive during the COVID-19 pandemic.

== Early life and education ==
Stern attended West Orange High School. He received a Bachelor of Arts degree from Clark University in 1988, and Juris Doctor degree from Brooklyn Law School in 1991.

== Government and private legal career ==
From 1991 to 1998, Stern was in the private practice of law in New York and New Jersey, first with the firm of Kanterman, Taub & Breitner and then at Stern & Gonzalez, of which he was a founding partner. From 1998 to 2002, Stern served in Rhode Island's Department of Business Regulation as its Chief Securities Examiner and also as Deputy Chief of Legal Services. From 2002 to 2006, he was the Executive Director and Chief Legal Officer for the Rhode Island Department of Administration. Stern prosecuted securities fraud, insider trading, banking and insurance cases in representing Rhode Island.

From 2006 to 2009, Stern was Chief of Staff to Rhode Island Governor Donald L. Carcieri. In that role, Stern's responsibilities included overseeing executive branch departments employing more than 13,000 people, being the governor's lead policy and political advisor, and serving as the governor's representative "in major labor, budget, legislative and federal-state matters".

== Judicial service ==
In 2009, Rhode Island Governor Donald L. Carcieri nominated Stern for a lifetime appointment to serve as an associate justice on Rhode Island's Superior Court. The Superior court is a trial level court with general jurisdiction over criminal felony matters, and civil cases where the amount in controversy exceeds $10,000 or the claims are brought in equity.

Stern was appointed to the Superior Court's Business Calendar in 2011, and remains a Business Calendar judge (as of 2026). He became the senior Business Calendar judge in 2019, upon the retirement of Associate Justice Michael A. Silverstein. The Business Calendar is a specialized business court program within the Superior Court, created by administrative order in 2001 by Presiding Justice Joseph F. Rogers, Jr., and shaped by Rogers and Silverstein. It is designed to handle complex business and commercial litigation, as well as business insolvencies. It is one of the oldest business court programs in the United States.

In 2020, in the face of the COVID-19 pandemic, Stern initiated the creation of a Business Calendar program known as "The Business Recovery Plan". This plan was created and designed to help businesses suffering from the pandemic's economic effects that were causing severe income losses and the inability to timely pay creditors. The plan utilized a non-liquidating receivership model to keep businesses afloat, providing an opportunity to work with creditors to stabilize their business until they could eventually generate income and pay creditors. This recovery plan had an effect beyond Rhode Island. At a minimum, it inspired Philadelphia Judge Gary S. Glazer to implement a similar program in Philadelphia's Commerce Case Management Program, another American business court.

Stern's notable cases include, among others: the 2017 murder trial of Christian Lepore; an internal dispute among the family of Malcolm "Kim" Chace, at one time the wealthiest person in Rhode Island; overseeing the receivership of the St. Joseph Hospital employee pension fund; the dispute over building the Fane Tower in Providence, Rhode Island; a suit by the parent company of the Houston Rockets basketball team for insurance coverage from FM Global during the COVID-19 pandemic; the liquidation of the Central Coventry Fire District; the state's demands for over $15 million in medical payments from Prospect Medical Holdings; the receivership and sale of Westerly Hospital, which was recognized as a Deal of the Year; a suit by the State of Rhode Island against a number of contractors in connection with alleged construction failures of the Washington Bridge in Providence, and determining Nelson Blanco not to be a public danger 5 months before he allegedly stabbed a 2 year old.

Stern serves as co-chair of the Rhode Island Supreme Court Judicial Education Program.

== Public service ==
In 2023, Stern was elected chairperson of the Roger Williams University School of Law Board of Directors, where he is also an adjunct professor. Nationally, Stern is a director of the American College of Business Court Judges.

== Author ==
Stern has authored numerous written legal opinions during his time as a judge. In addition, he has authored or co-authored articles on legal subjects, both before and after his time as a judge, including, among others;

- Rhode Island Legal Practice Meets Digital Transformation: A Call for Technological Competence
- If It’s Not Football, Don’t Bet on the GOAT: What Lawyers Should Expect Following the Crypto Crash
- An Introduction to the Business Calendar, the Business Recovery Program, and Virtual Hearings
- The Triage and Treatment of Healthcare Institutions in Distress: How to Involve State Regulators in Healthcare Bankruptcies and Receiverships
- Cyberbullying--An Age Old Problem, A New Generation
- Sour Grapes: Unrestrained Bid Protest Litigation in Rhode Island - Blue Cross & Blue Shield of Rhode Island v. Najarian

== Positions and honors ==
Stern has held the following positions or received the following recognitions, among others;

- Elected chairperson of the Roger Williams School of Law Board of Directors (2023)
- Director, American College of Business Court Judges
- Editorial Board, Rhode Island Bar Association
- Director, American Heart Association – Rhode Island Affiliate
- Fellow, Rhode Island Bar Foundation
- Oversaw receivership that ultimately resulted in a sale that The Merger & Acquisition Advisor recognized with its annual Turnaround Award as Deal of the Year
