= Gary S. Glazer =

American judge

Judge, Court of Common Pleas of Philadelphia, Pennsylvania First Judicial District, Elected in 1991, Won retention elections in 2001 and 2011 for ten year terms
- In office 1991–2021

Judge, Commerce Court, 2012 to 2021, Supervising Judge 2018 to 2021
- Succeeded by: Leon W. Tucker

Administrative Judge: Philadelphia Traffic Court (2011 to 2013), and Traffic Division of Philadelphia Municipal Court (2013-2021)
- Appointed by: Supreme Court of Pennsylvania
- Preceded by: Michael J. Sullivan
- Succeeded by: Joffie C. Pittman, III

Personal details
- Education: The Ohio State University (B.A. cum laude 1972); Case Western Reserve University School of Law (J.D. 1975)

Gary Stuart Glazer is a retired American judge who served for 30 years in the Court of Common Pleas of Philadelphia, part of Pennsylvania's First Judicial District. During that time, he also served as an administrative judge in two other courts within the First Judicial District. As a Common Pleas judge, Glazer served in the criminal and civil divisions, and was Supervising Judge of Philadelphia's Commerce Case Management Program from 2018 to 2021. In response to the Philadelphia Traffic Court scandal of 2011, Pennsylvania's Supreme Court appointed Glazer as Administrative Judge of the Traffic Court in 2011 to reverse many years of institutional corruption, while still maintaining his role as a full-time Court of Common Pleas judge. Glazer also became known for innovative court programs within the Commerce Court. He has also been very involved in lecturing on the American legal system outside the United States.

== Early life and education ==
Glazer is from Ohio. He received his B.A., cum laude, from Ohio State University in 1972, where he was elected Phi Beta Kappa, and his Juris Doctor degree from Case Western Reserve University School of Law in 1975.

== Legal practice ==
Among other jurisdictions, Glazer was admitted to practice law in Illinois' state courts (1975) and Pennsylvania's state courts (1984). He worked at private law firms in Chicago, Illinois and Philadelphia, and was an Assistant United States Attorney in Philadelphia for over 10 years, serving as chief of its Fraud Section, including prosecutions for judicial corruption as well as complex frauds.

As an assistant U.S. attorney in Philadelphia, Glazer successfully prosecuted a federal case against Philadelphia Judge Kenneth S. Harris for taking bribes to fix cases. Glazer also successfully prosecuted Philadelphia Judge Thomas N. Shiomos in a bribery scandal involving illegal payments from a trade union. Two years after the successful prosecutions, a judicial commission established by Pennsylvania governor Robert Casey Sr. recommended that Glazer should be nominated and supported in becoming a judge in Philadelphia. He also had local support in Philadelphia from lawyers advocating for "good judges" to serve in Philadelphia's judiciary. Glazer was viewed as a non-political choice who would be acceptable generally to all parties in Philadelphia.

As observed in a November 19, 2012 report from Chadwick Associates, Inc., which had been engaged by Pennsylvania's First Judicial District in connection with a later scandal in Philadelphia's Traffic Court, Glazer's experience with judicial prosecutions would, in part, lead to his appointment as administrative judge in implementing ethical reforms in Philadelphia's Traffic Court.

== Judicial service ==
Glazer was first elected to the Philadelphia Court of Common Pleas in 1991, with the support of both political parties. He was 41-years old at the time. He won retention elections in 2001 and 2011, each for ten-year terms. In August of 2021, he declared that he would not run for judicial retention again. During his tenure, Glazer served in the Court of Common Pleas' civil and criminal divisions, presiding over a wide range of case types, including, for example, capital and non-capital homicides, professional malpractice cases, general civil litigation and other serious criminal matters, class actions, administrative appeals, real estate cases, and tax matters.

In 2004, while holding a sentencing hearing on a convicted criminal defendant, the defendant physically moved toward Glazer in the courtroom. An armed deputy sheriff intervened and attempted to restrain the defendant from reaching Glazer, ultimately shooting the defendant.

In December 2011, Pennsylvania's Supreme Court made Glazer administrative judge of Philadelphia's Traffic Court, and in 2013, he was made the administrative judge of the Municipal Court of Philadelphia's new Traffic Division. In 2012, he was assigned to the Court of Common Pleas' specialized business court program, the Commerce Case Management Program ("Commerce Court"), additionally becoming the Commerce Court's supervising judge from 2018 to 2021.

Uniquely, from 2011 to 2021 Glazer simultaneously had two distinct judicial roles in the First Judicial District in three different courts, one judgeship being elected (Court of Common Pleas) and the others appointed (Traffic Court/Municipal Court). Moreover, he was an administrative judge in two distinct courts from 2018 to 2021.

=== Traffic court administrative judge ===
Until 2013, Philadelphia's court system included a constitutionally created Traffic Court, with its own elected judges. The Traffic court was terminated by statute in 2013. It was completely abolished by constitutional amendment in 2016. The 2013 legislation putting an end to the Traffic court also created a new Traffic Division in Philadelphia's Municipal Court.

In early 2011, the FBI raided the homes and offices of Philadelphia Traffic Court officials, including judges, in connection with an alleged ongoing, years long, pattern of fixing traffic citations. A study and report commissioned by Pennsylvania's Supreme Court concluded that the traffic court practiced a "two-track system of justice, one for the politically connected and another for the unwitting general public. ... [And] that the [traffic court] judges routinely made, accepted and granted third-party requests for preferential treatment for politically connected individuals with cases in Traffic Court."

In December 2011, then Pennsylvania Chief Justice Ronald D. Castille and Pennsylvania's Supreme Court removed the Traffic Court's administrative judge and replaced him with Glazer as administrative judge. Glazer was given the task of overseeing the implementation of traffic court reforms, with authority over all of that court's judges. Glazer worked to implement ethical reforms, and in 2013 testified in Pennsylvania's legislature in support of changes in the law that would reshape and transform the Traffic Court. In mid-2013, legislation was passed ending the Traffic Court as a functioning court, and creating the Traffic Division of Philadelphia's Municipal Court to replace the Traffic Court. Glazer served as administrative judge of the Municipal Court's traffic division from its inception in 2013 through 2021, being succeeded by Judge Joffie C. Pittman, III. In all, Glazer served ten years as administrative leader of Philadelphia's traffic tribunals.

=== Commerce court judge ===
Glazer was assigned as one of three judges to the Commerce Court in early 2012. The Commerce Court is a specialized business court, created by administrative order in 1999, with a limited case type jurisdiction primarily focused on adjudicating business and commercial disputes. Cases are assigned to a single judge from beginning to end. In 2018, he succeeded Judge Patricia A. McInerney as the Commerce Court's supervising judge. He was himself succeeded in 2021 in this role by Judge Nina Wright Padilla.

In 2018, under Glazer's initiative, the Taxicab Medallion Loan Program was created as part of the Commerce Court. There was a financial crisis in Philadelphia's taxicab industry caused when hundreds of thousands of dollars in loans were taken against individual taxicab medallions and licenses, which later lost most of their value after the advent of competitive rideshare programs Uber and Lyft. Lenders were going to court seeking judgments on unpaid loans and seizure of the medallions for sale at auction. The Medallion Loan Program created rules for early court intervention in lender actions, and a streamlined litigation and alternative dispute resolution process to promote potentially more efficient and better resolutions.

In 2020, during the COVID-19 crisis, Glazer led the effort in creating the Temporary Financial Monitor Program. This program was an effort to address the financial crises among small businesses unable to generate sufficient income to meet their debt obligations. It was designed to operate under the auspices of the Commerce Court, by helping small businesses negotiate with their lenders and creditors in an effort to survive the crisis until they could become fully operational again.

He is also one of the few U.S. judges to actively participate in the Standing International Forum of Commercial Courts.

=== Notable cases ===
A few of Glazer's notable cases as a judge include: a suit challenging Philadelphia's soda tax, matters involving the 2020 U.S. presidential elections, and a wide range of matters involving insurance coverage and the disclosure of factual details in connection with the Pennsylvania State University Jerry Sandusky sexual abuse scandal.

== Positions and honors ==
Glazer is an adjunct instructor at Villanova University's School of Law (trial practice), and has lectured internationally in France, the United Kingdom, Russia, the Czech Republic, and Belarus.

In 2005, Glazer received a Fulbright Senior Specialist Grant to lecture on American judicial process at the Ecole Nationale de la Magistrature (French National School for the Judiciary) in Paris, conducting those four lectures in French.
