= C. Darnell Jones II =

American judge (born 1949)

Senior Judge of the United States District Court for the Eastern District of Pennsylvania
- Incumbent
- Assumed office March 15, 2021

Judge of the United States District Court for the Eastern District of Pennsylvania
- In office October 30, 2008 – March 15, 2021
- Appointed by: George W. Bush
- Preceded by: Bruce William Kauffman
- Succeeded by: Kai Scott

Judge of the First Judicial District of Pennsylvania
- In office Elected November 1987 – October 2008

Personal details
- Born: Cardozie Darnell Jones II; November 23, 1949 (age 76) Claremore, Oklahoma, U.S.
- Party: Democratic
- Spouse: Evelyn A. Williams
- Children: Sheinelle Jones
- Education: Southwestern College (AB); American University (JD)

Cardozie Darnell Jones II (born November 23, 1949) is an inactive senior United States district judge of the United States District Court for the Eastern District of Pennsylvania. He was a judge of the Philadelphia Court of Common Pleas in the First Judicial District of Pennsylvania from 1987 to 2008. He was president judge of the First Judicial District from 2006 to 2008, and was assigned to the court's specialized business court docket, the Commerce Case Management Program during his time as a state court trial judge. Jones has instructed other judges in Philadelphia and nationally, including on how to manage capital cases; and has taught at a number of law schools in Philadelphia, over a period of decades.

== Early life and education ==
Jones was born on November 23, 1949, in Claremore, Oklahoma. His parents were educators. In 1958, Jones represented his grade school in a citywide spelling bee competition. In 1962, he was among 10 students receiving a special citizenship award from the Claremore Masonic Lodge, based upon their qualities of "honor, courage, scholarship, leadership, service, character and loyalty". He graduated from Claremore High School in 1968. In January 1968, he was among a group of high school seniors from eight different schools in Rogers County, Oklahoma honored by the Oklahoma State University Alumni of Rogers County. He played on Claremont's football team, and was an honorable mention All-Verdigris Valley Conference player as a senior.

He received an Artium Baccalaureus degree in French from Southwestern College in 1972, and a Juris Doctor from the American University Washington College of Law in 1975. While at Southwestern, he studied black history, economics and culture on his own time in the school's library, and became so knowledgeable on these subjects that he was permitted to teach a class on them at Southwestern. In early 1971, Jones was among 50 college students nationally invited by President Richard Nixon to attend the 19th annual National Prayer Breakfast, in Washington, D.C.

== Legal career ==
=== Lawyer and teacher ===
Jones served with the Defender Association of Philadelphia from 1975 to 1987. He was a trial attorney from 1976 to 1987; and served as assistant chief of the Family Court Division (1979 to 1985) and as its chief from 1985 to 1987, representing indigent juveniles. He was an adjunct professor at St. Joseph's University School of Criminal Justice from 1991 to 1992, the Temple University Beasley School of Law from 1992 to 1996, and the University of Pennsylvania Law School since 1993. He was a curriculum developer/instructor and instructed judges on how to handle capital cases and criminal evidence, at the National Judicial College, from 1998 to 2008.

=== Philadelphia court of common pleas ===
In 1987, after a number of judges were removed from Pennsylvania's First Judicial District in the Philadelphia Court of Common Pleas for corruption, Governor Robert P. Casey, Sr. nominated replacement judges to Pennsylvania's State Senate, including Jones. The senate did not accept three of Casey's nominations, including Jones, Legrome D. Davis, and John W. Herron. These three, along with Casey nominees Mark I. Bernstein, and Edward R. Summers, chose to run in elections for the Court of Common Pleas later that year, ultimately winning their elections in 1987. They are sometimes referred to as the "Casey Five". Casey had chosen Davis, Herron, and Jones without the input of any political party leaders; and though running as Democrats, the three were not endorsed by any political party in the election. Moreover, all five were actively opposed by some Democratic party leaders, such as state senator Vincent Fumo and Bob Brady; difficult obstacles to overcome in Philadelphia judicial elections. However, they did receive support from office holders Mayor Wilson Goode and District Attorney Ronald D. Castille, along with former District Attorney Ed Rendell who was running for mayor against Goode; in addition to Casey's endorsement and active support.

Jones was a judge on the Court of Common Pleas from 1987 to 2008, serving as president judge from 2006 to 2008. In 2007, with the support of then Pennsylvania Governor Ed Rendell, among others, and the endorsement of major newspapers across Pennsylvania, Jones ran as a Democrat for a position on the Supreme Court of Pennsylvania; but was unsuccessful in the primary election. While president judge, Pennsylvania's Supreme Court appointed Jones to serve as chair of the Administrative Governing Board of the First Judicial District, which co-ordinates all of the courts within that judicial district. During his time on the Court of Common Pleas, Jones was also a presiding and co-coordinating judge in the homicide division; a presiding judge in the major civil trial division; and was assigned to the Commerce Case Management Program as a specialized business court judge.

As president judge, Jones was instrumental in creating the Philadelphia Court of Common Pleas' Mortgage Foreclosure Diversion Program, during the national foreclosure crisis of 2008. The program was considered a success. As a business court judge nationally, he was a director of the American College of Business Court Judges. He also served as a Business Court Representative to the American Bar Association's Business Law Section.

=== Federal judicial service ===
With the support of Pennsylvania's United States Senators Bob Casey Jr. and Arlen Specter, on July 24, 2008, Jones was nominated by President George W. Bush to the seat on the United States District Court for the Eastern District of Pennsylvania vacated by Judge Bruce William Kauffman. Jones was confirmed by the United States Senate on September 26, 2008, and received his commission on October 30, 2008. He assumed senior status on March 15, 2021. Jones assumed inactive status upon turning 73 in late 2022.

== Author ==
During his time on the Court of Common Pleas, Jones authored hundreds of legal opinions, in addition to the legal opinions he issued from 2008 to 2022 as a federal trial judge. In 2020, Jones was a contributing author to the National Judicial College publication, Presiding Over a Capital Case, An Electronic Benchbook for Judges, co-authoring the chapters on case management and pre-trial matters unique to capital cases (chapters 2 and 3). He had earlier co-authored the judicial guidebook, Presiding Over a Capital Case, A Benchbook for Judges published by the National Judicial College in 2009.

== Awards and honors ==
In 2023, Jones received the Justice William J. Brennan Jr. Distinguished Jurist Award from the Philadelphia Bar Association, given to judges who adhere “to the highest ideals of judicial service” and who have “made a significant, positive impact on the quality or administration of justice in Philadelphia….” In receiving the award, Jones said "the most important decision he ever made was the travel to a New Orleans suburb the week after Hurricane Katrina to help those who had lost their homes and possessions".

In 2005, Jones was named one of the 500 leading judges in America by Lawdragon magazine. In 2007, the Criminal Justice Section of the Philadelphia Bar Association presented Jones with its Thurgood Marshall Award for excellence. He also received Philadelphia's Louis D. Brandeis Law Society award for community service in 2006. In October 2015, Jones was chosen to present the Rogers State University’s Maurice Meyer Distinguished Endowed Lecture in Claremore, Oklahoma. In 2018, Jones was inducted into the Claremore Hall of Fame, having earlier been inducted into the Claremore Public Schools Foundation's Hall of Fame in 1995.

== See also ==
- List of African-American federal judges
- List of African-American jurists

Legal offices
Preceded by Bruce William Kauffman	Judge of the United States District Court for the Eastern District of Pennsylvania; 2008–2021	Succeeded by Kai Scott
