= Russell M. Nigro =

American judge

Justice of the Pennsylvania Supreme Court
- In office January 1, 1996 – January 2, 2006
- Succeeded by: Cynthia Baldwin

Judge of the Philadelphia County Court of Common Pleas
- In office July 2, 1987 – January 1, 1996

Personal details
- Born: March 23, 1946 (age 80)
- Party: Democratic
- Education: Temple University (BBA); Rutgers University (JD)

Russell M. Nigro (born March 23, 1946) is a former justice of the Supreme Court of Pennsylvania. He first ran on the Democratic ticket in 1995. He ran for retention in 2005 but lost, thus making him the first Supreme Court Justice to lose a retention vote since such elections were first held in 1968.

== Education ==
Nigro graduated from Temple University in 1969 with a Bachelors of Business Administration degree, and received his Juris Doctor degree from Rutgers University (Camden) School of Law in 1973. He also served as an adjunct professor at Temple University.

== Legal career ==
Nigro was in the private practice of law from 1973 to 1987. In 1987, he was nominated to by Pennsylvania Governor Robert Casey Sr. to serve as a judge on the Court of Common Pleas of Philadelphia, in Pennsylvania's First Judicial District (a trial level court), and was approved by Pennsylvania's Senate. In November of 1987, he won election to the Court of Common Pleas.

=== Pennsylvania Supreme Court ===
Nigro was elected to Pennsylvania's Supreme Court for a ten-year term in 1995, however he was defeated in a retention election in 2005. Nigro's retention had been recommended by the Pennsylvania Bar Association, which recognized he had served with distinction on the Supreme Court for ten years, stating that Nigro's "independence, work ethic and commitment to enhancing the quality of justice in Pennsylvania all clearly warrant that Justice Nigro be retained as a member of Pennsylvania's highest Court." In 2002, Nigro had received the Philadelphia Bar Association's Justice William J. Brennan Jr. Distinguished Jurist Award. "The award recognizes a jurist who adheres to the highest ideals of judicial service."

The ousting of Justice Nigro was the direct result of public anger over a pay raise for members of all three branches of state government, which the General Assembly passed without public notice or debate in the early morning hours of July 7, 2005 and then-governor Ed Rendell quickly signed. Although Nigro was not a member of the state legislature, and so had not voted on the pay increase, executive and legislative elections would not be held until the following year, and so the public voiced its displeasure by denying retention to Justice Nigro. Nigro received strong support from southeastern Pennsylvania, including his native Philadelphia, but met strong opposition in southwestern and southcentral Pennsylvania where anger over the pay raise was greatest.

=== Post-supreme court ===
Nigro served on Philadelphia County's Board of Revision of Taxes (BRT) from 2006 to 2015. As of 2015, Nigro was serving as the BRT's chair, presiding over real estate tax appeals. He resigned from the BRT as of December 31, 2015. Members of the BRT receive a salary of $70,000 for what the Philadelphia Inquirer had called a "part time" job.

Nigro has overseen a virtual mediation program involving asbestos and talc litigation in the Philadelphia Court of Common Pleas. He has also served as a discovery master in that court's Risperdal litigation. Nigro also serves as a private mediator.

== Vacancy ==
Governor Rendell nominated Allegheny County Common Pleas Judge Cynthia Baldwin to temporarily fill the vacancy created by Nigro's losing the retention election, through January 2008. She was the first African American woman to sit on Pennsylvania's Supreme Court.

== See also ==
- 2005 Pennsylvania General Assembly pay raise controversy
