= Judge Ludwig =

Judge Ludwig may refer to:

- Brett H. Ludwig (born 1969), judge of the United States District Court for the Eastern District of Wisconsin
- Edmund V. Ludwig (1928–2016), judge of the United States District Court for the Eastern District of Pennsylvania
