= Kai Scott =

American judge (born 1970)

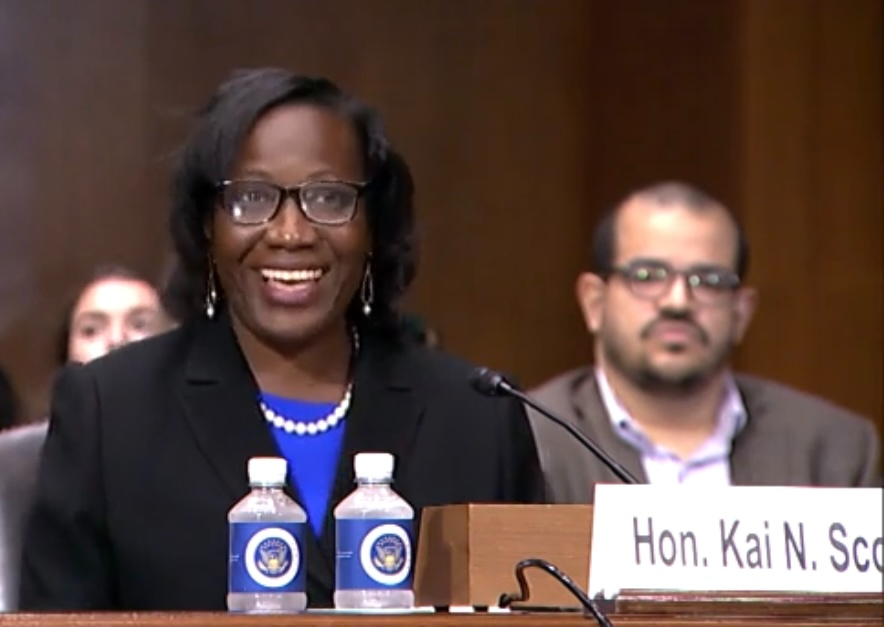

Judge of the United States District Court for the Eastern District of Pennsylvania
- Incumbent
- Assumed office January 18, 2023
- Appointed by: Joe Biden
- Preceded by: C. Darnell Jones II

Judge of the Philadelphia County Court of Common Pleas
- In office January 2016 – January 18, 2023

Personal details
- Born: Kai Niambi Scott; 1970 (age 55–56) Philadelphia, Pennsylvania, U.S.
- Party: Democratic
- Education: Hampton University (BA); West Virginia University (JD)

Kai Niambi Scott (born 1970) is an American attorney who is a United States district judge of the United States District Court for the Eastern District of Pennsylvania. She previously served as a judge on the Philadelphia County Court of Common Pleas from 2015 to 2023.

== Education ==
Scott earned a Bachelor of Arts degree from Hampton University in 1991 and a Juris Doctor from the West Virginia University College of Law in 1995.

== Career ==
From 1996 to 1998, Scott served as a law clerk for the Pennsylvania Bureau of Workers Compensation. From 1998 to 2004, she was a trial attorney for the Defender Association of Philadelphia. She served as an assistant federal public defender from 2004 to 2010. From 2010 to 2015, Scott served as the trial unit chief for the Federal Community Defender Office in the Eastern District of Pennsylvania. She was elected to the Philadelphia County Court of Common Pleas in 2015.

=== Federal judicial service ===
On July 12, 2022, President Joe Biden nominated Scott to serve as a United States district judge of the United States District Court for the Eastern District of Pennsylvania. President Biden nominated Scott to the seat vacated by Judge C. Darnell Jones II, who assumed senior status on March 15, 2021. On September 7, 2022, a hearing on her nomination was held before the Senate Judiciary Committee. On September 28, 2022, her nomination was reported out of committee by a 13–9 vote. On December 7, 2022, the United States Senate invoked cloture on her nomination by a 52–42 vote. Later that day, her nomination was confirmed by a 50–42 vote. She received her judicial commission on January 18, 2023.

== See also ==
- List of African-American federal judges
- List of African-American jurists

Legal offices
Preceded by C. Darnell Jones II	Judge of the United States District Court for the Eastern District of Pennsylvania; 2023–present	Incumbent
