= John W. Herron =

American judge

Judge, Philadelphia Court of Common Pleas, First Judicial District of Pennsylvania (Elected in 1987, won retention elections in 1997 and 2007, senior judge 2014 to 2023)
- In office 1988–2023

Administrative Judge, Court of Common Pleas, First Judicial District of Pennsylvania, 1996 to 2002, 2011 to 2014

Personal details
- Education: Duke University (B.A. 1966); Dickinson School of Law (J.D. 1969)

John W. Herron is a retired American judge who served for 35 years on the Court of Common Pleas of Pennsylvania's First Judicial District, located in Philadelphia. Herron was the trial division's administrative judge for three three-year terms. As administrative judge in 1999, he issued the order creating the Commerce Case Management Program (Commerce Court), Pennsylvania's first specialized business court program. He was first elected in 1987, after having been one of the few judges in modern Pennsylvania history to be recommended for office based on a merit selection process.

== Judicial service ==
Herron was first elected a judge to the Philadelphia Court of Common Pleas in 1987, and was successful in retention elections in 1997 and 2007. He was the court's Administrative Judge from 1996 to 2002 and from 2011 to 2014. He became a senior judge in 2014, upon reaching mandatory retirement age (which was raised to 75 in 2016), and continued serving on Philadelphia's Orphans' Court until his retirement in 2023.

=== Background to first election in 1987 and merit selection ===
In 1986, a bribery scandal involving judges had enveloped the Philadelphia Court of Common Pleas. A significant number of judges had been removed or were going to be removed from the court. In 1987, Pennsylvania Governor Robert P. Casey Sr. created a commission to find replacement judges based on their merit. In February 1987, he nominated 10 people for appointment to the Pennsylvania State Senate, rather than pursuing judgeships through election in the first instance. Of the people Casey nominated to the senate based on his merit selection commission's recommendations, three were not accepted in the senate, arguably because at least some of them did not have strong political affiliations. Herron was one of these three nominees, along with Legrome D. Davis and C. Darnell Jones, II. Five of Casey's nominations, Herron, Davis and Jones, as well as Mark I. Bernstein and Edward Summers, ran as Democrats for the Court of Common Pleas that year; becoming known as the "Casey Five". They were all opposed by the Philadelphia Democratic party. However, they were supported by Philadelphia Mayor Wilson Goode, District Attorney of Philadelphia Ronald D. Castille, and Goode's opponent for mayor, Edward G. Rendell, as well as Casey; and all were successful in winning election to the Court of Common Pleas.

Speaking to Pennsylvania's General Assembly years later, Casey stated that "regardless of the ultimate outcome, our duty to reform our judicial system is clear and immediate. Judicial reform has been one of my top priorities. One of the first things I did as Governor in 1987 was respond forcefully to corruption on the bench in Philadelphia. Standing up to powerful political forces, I appointed honest, competent judges - the Casey Five, they called them. When they were denied confirmation, we elected them over the political opposition of some in both parties."

=== Judicial Conduct Board ===
Pennsylvania's constitution was amended to allow the creation of a Judicial Conduct Board in 1993. The board has the power to investigate and prosecute ethical misconduct by Pennsylvania judicial officers. Herron was appointed by Casey to the first board, serving until August 1996.

=== As administrative judge of the Court of Common Pleas ===
In Pennsylvania, each judicial division's Court of Common Pleas has an administrative judge appointed by Pennsylvania's Supreme Court. The administrative judge has the powers of administrative supervision over the other judges in that district. Among other things, the administrative judge has the power to: assign judges to judicial positions and to assign court staff; assign physical courtrooms and offices; and to maintain lists of judges for carrying out various judicial functions.

Herron was selected by Pennsylvania's Supreme Court multiple times to serve as the Philadelphia Court of Common Pleas' administrative judge. He originally served two three-year terms as Philadelphia's administrative judge from 1996 to 2002. The Supreme Court selected him again in November 2011, serving in that position until 2014.

During his first tenure as administrative judge, he "was credited with establishing the [First Judicial District's] Commerce Court, and implementing a case management program that substantially reduced a backlog of cases." As administrative judge, he also was known for restructuring the court's mass tort program, overseeing construction of a high-tech courtroom (Courtroom 625), and relocating the court's complex litigation center to Philadelphia's City Hall.

In 2012, he ordered multi-fold increases in the fees paid to defense lawyers assigned to capital cases, to facilitate obtaining counsel for defendant's facing the death penalty and reduce a shortage of qualified lawyers willing to defend the poor in death-penalty cases.

In 2011, Pennsylvania's Supreme Court also appointed Herron to a one-year term (beginning January 1, 2012) as chair of the First Judicial District's Administrative Governing Board, overseeing Pennsylvania's largest court system. This board co-ordinates the Court of Common Pleas three divisions, Trial, Family and Orphans.

=== Creating the Commerce Court ===
As Administrative Judge, in 1999 Herron issued the order creating the Commerce Court, effective January 1, 2000. He served as one of the two original Commerce Court judges from 2000 to 2002. The Commerce Court is a specialized business court with a jurisdiction primarily focused on business and commercial litigation. It was the first specialized business court in Pennsylvania, and is one of the older business court programs in the United States. There is one specialist business court judge assigned to each case from beginning to end. In Philadelphia, the Commerce Court originally had two designated judges, Herron and Albert W. Sheppard Jr., which later expanded to three assigned judges. During his time as a Commerce Court judge, Herron wrote numerous, sometimes lengthy, legal opinions; and overall, there are more than 1,000 Commerce Court opinions issued to date.

"Herron has called working with Sheppard to develop the Commerce Court his proudest achievement".

=== Orphans' court ===
In 2002, Herron was assigned to the Orphan's Division of Philadelphia's Court of Common Pleas, where he served for 20 years until his retirement. Although appointed administrative judge in 2011, the Supreme Court order doing so directed that he could continue as a judge in Orphans' court so long as it did not interfere with his administrative duties.

The Orphans' court "serves to protect the personal and property rights of all persons and entities who are otherwise incapable of managing their own affairs." The term orphan is not used to mean an absence of parents, but to mean parties that lack protection. For example, this division has jurisdiction over affairs of nonprofit charitable organizations as well as those of individuals such as minors or incapacitated persons. Orphans' court judges can appoint guardians, and can examine and audit the actions of fiduciaries, guardians, and agents with powers of attorney. It may be most well known for handling disputes over inheritance and estates. Herron began his legal career as a trust and estates lawyer.

=== Challenging retirement age ===
In 2012, he was among the judges bringing suit challenging the 70-year old mandatory retirement age for Pennsylvania judges. The suit, captioned Judge John W. Herron v. Governor of Pennsylvania, was filed in state court and removed to federal court. Though the suit was not successful in court, Chapter 5, § 16 of Pennsylvania's constitution was amended in 2016 to raise the judicial retirement age from 70 to 75.

== Legal practice ==
Herron first practiced law with the private law firm White and Williams. He next became a Deputy District Attorney for Investigations in the Philadelphia District Attorney's Office, then headed by Arlen Spector, where he handled criminal jury and non-jury trials from 1971 to 1973. He next joined the newly formed Office of Disciplinary Counsel, overseeing attorney misconduct, first as an assistant, but eventually serving as Chief Disciplinary Counsel. In this role, he often appeared before Pennsylvania's Supreme Court. He served in that office from 1973 to 1985. In 1986, he rejoined the Philadelphia District Attorney's Office, then headed by Ronald D. Castille, as Deputy Head of Investigations, the third highest ranking position in that office. He was chief of its municipal corruption unit. He served there until becoming a judge in 1988.

After retirement from the bench, Herron joined the Kang Haggerty law firm in its dispute resolution group, where he providedarbitration, mediation, and discovery dispute resolution services. He later formed his own firm focusing on mediation practice.

== Education ==
Herron received his Bachelor of Arts degree from Duke University in 1966, and his Juris Doctor degree from Dickinson Law School (now Penn State Dickinson Law School) in 1969.

Herron has been a lecturer at Temple Law School on professional responsibility and trial advocacy.

== Honors and positions ==
Herron has received the following honors and held the following positions, among others;

- Philadelphia Bar Association's Justice William J. Brennan Jr. Distinguished Jurist Award (2011). "The award recognizes a jurist who adheres to the highest ideals of judicial service."
- Administrative Judge, Philadelphia's Court of Common Pleas for three three-year terms, including a consecutive six-year period
- Appointed by Supreme Court of Pennsylvania as chair of the First Judicial District's Administrative Governing Board, overseeing Pennsylvania's largest court system (2012)
- Appointed by Pennsylvania's Governor as an inaugural member of the Commonwealth of Pennsylvania's Judicial Conduct Board
- Business Litigation Committee of the Philadelphia Bar Association's Business Law Section paid special tribute to Herron at annual Commerce Court reception (2015)
- Business Litigation Committee of the Philadelphia Bar Association's Business Law Section honored Herron, along with Albert W. Sheppard Jr., on their instrumental roles in making the Commerce Court successful (2010)
- The Legal Intelligencer's Lifetime Achievement Award
- Philadelphia Bar Association's Person of the Year
