= Albert W. Sheppard Jr. =

American judge (1937–2011)

Judge, Court of Common Pleas of Philadelphia, Pennsylvania First Judicial District
- In office Elected to ten-year term in 1983, won ten-year retention elections in 1993 and 2003 – September 4, 2011
- Succeeded by: Patricia A. McInerney

Personal details
- Born: June 3, 1937 Philadelphia, Pennsylvania
- Died: September 4, 2011 (aged 74) Philadelphia, Pennsylvania
- Education: Villanova University (B.S. 1960); Temple University School of Law (J.D., summa cum laude, 1968)

Albert William Sheppard Jr. (June 3, 1937 - September 4, 2011) was an American judge in the Court of Common Pleas of Philadelphia, in Pennsylvania’s First Judicial District for over 27 years. He played significant leadership roles in reducing that court’s case backlog, and in establishing its business court, the Commerce Case Management Program, on which he served for its first 11 years.

== Early life ==
Sheppard was born on June 3, 1937, in the East Oak Lane section of Philadelphia. He was the oldest of three children. Sheppard attended North Catholic High School, where he starred on the football team; graduating in 1955. His father was a linotypist, who at one time worked for the Philadelphia Evening Bulletin, and his mother was from the Eastern Shore of Mayland.

In 1960, Sheppard earned a bachelor of science degree in electrical engineering from Villanova University, cum laude; attending on an ROTC scholarship. Sheppard served in the United States Navy for four years, and was an operations officer. In October 1962, he was stationed on the destroyer USS Furse, which was part of the naval blockade during the Cuban Missile Crisis. He worked as an electrical engineer for the Philadelphia Electric Company after returning from the Navy.

== Legal career ==
=== Law school and legal practice ===
After his Naval service, while married to his first wife Marlene Sheppard with three children, and working during the day, Sheppard attended Temple University Law School at night. He graduated first in his class in 1968. He was an associate editor on the law review. After graduating law school in 1968, Sheppard practiced law at private law firms, including Schnader, Harrison, Segal & Lewis, and the firm of Monteverde, Hemphill, Maschmeyer & Obert until becoming a judge in 1983.

=== Judicial service ===
In 1983, Sheppard was elected to a ten-year term in the Court of Common Pleas. He was successful in ten-year retention elections in 1993 and 2003. He took senior status at age 70, and handled a full case load until his death at age 74. In deciding to become a judge after practicing as a lawyer, Sheppard said he "was better suited to be a referee than a combatant". Sheppard served in the court's Family Division in the 1980s, and was its emergency judge in at least December 2006.

In 1989, Pennsylvania’s Supreme Court appointed Sheppard “to chair a committee tasked with reviewing the operations of the Philadelphia court system". The committee came to informally bear Sheppard's name. In 1990, that committee issued an 89-page report recommending "innovative reforms that eliminated lengthy backlogs and improved the civil trial division so much that the National Center for State Courts has called the Philadelphia Court of Common Pleas ‘one of the finest and most successful urban trial courts in the country’”.

As reported by the Committee of Seventy, Sheppard headed a group of 16 judges that recommended, among other things, administrative reorganizing, monitoring judicial productivity, and innovations in case management procedures and techniques, such as case tracking. In response to praise over the committee's work, Sheppard was especially proud that the 16 judges worked together, and remarked, "The less said about me, the better". Philadelphia Judge Carolyn E. Temin observed that Sheppard's self-effacing manner, efficiency, and focus on achieving a substantive goal made him a natural leader who could encourage the group to work together towards that end.

In 1999, the Philadelphia Court of Common Pleas' Supervising Judge John W. Herron issued an order creating a specialized business court docket, the Commerce Case Management Program (Commerce Court). Sheppard was part of the group of judges and lawyers developing this new business court program. On January 1, 2000, Sheppard became one of the original two judges assigned to handle Commerce Court cases, and remained a Commerce Court judge until his death in September 2011. He wrote the Commerce Court's first legal opinion on March 7, 2000, and issued over 250 Commerce Court opinions during his tenure, making him the Commerce Court's most prolific opinion writer. He was succeeded on the Commerce Court by Judge Patricia A. McInerney.

At the time of his death, then Philadelphia Bar Association Chancellor Rudolph Garcia said Sheppard was instrumental in the Commerce Court's success in Philadelphia. Garcia observed that as a judge, Sheppard "was very practical and worked hard to resolve disputes by agreement, but he made tough decisions when necessary". Judge John Herron, who appointed Sheppard to the Commerce Court, stated of Sheppard "From the time he got here, he displayed marvelous character and a brilliant legal mind. When I was administrative judge, I leaned on him heavily for advice". Sheppard enjoyed being a judge, and was quoted as saying "If they didn't pay me, I'd pay them . . . I couldn't afford to do that, but that's how much I like it".

Sheppard participated in the first meeting of the American College of Business Court Judges in 2005.

== Awards and recognition ==
Sheppard graduated summa cum laude from Temple University's Law School in 1968. In 1990, he received the Golden Crowbar Award from the Pennsylvania Conference of State Trial Judges for his work as chair of a committee tasked with making recommendations to make the courts more efficient. In 2008, Sheppard received the Justice William J. Brennan Jr. Distinguished Jurist Award from the Philadelphia Bar Association, given to judges who adhere “to the highest ideals of judicial service” and who have “made a significant, positive impact on the quality or administration of justice in Philadelphia….” Shortly after his death in 2011, the Philadelphia Bar Association's Board of Governors adopted a resolution recognizing “the character, leadership and achievements of the Honorable Albert W. Sheppard, Jr., an eminent Philadelphia jurist, colleague and friend….”

In 2013, the Philadelphia Bar Foundation established The Honorable Albert W. Sheppard Scholarship Fund, in coordination with the Philadelphia Bar Association Business Law Section's Business Litigation Committee. This Fund provides a scholarship supporting a law student's year-long Commerce Court clerkship. Sheppard's alma mater, Temple University Beasley School of Law, later partnered with the Philadelphia Bar Foundation in supporting the fund, also known as the Albert W. Sheppard Fellowship Program.

== Personal life and death ==
Sheppard had a passion for music, and was a fine pianist who composed music. In 2017, Sheppard's daughter, M. Susan Sheppard, was appointed a judge in the Superior Court of New Jersey for Atlantic and Cape May Counties. His son Mark became an attorney in Philadelphia, and daughter Lisa became a physician.

Sheppard died of a heart attack at his home in Philadelphia on September 4, 2011. He was survived by his three children and Marlene Sheppard, his second wife Alice C. Sheppard and stepdaughter Tanya Hayner, and nine grandchildren.
