= Patricia A. McInerney =

American judge

Judge, Court of Common Pleas of Philadelphia, First Judicial District of Pennsylvania
- In office 1996–2018

Judge, Commerce Case Management Program (2011-2018, 2016-2018 as Supervising Judge)

Personal details
- Education: Colgate University (B.A. with honors, M.A.); Temple University School of Law (J.D. 1981)

Patricia A. McInerney is a retired American judge who served for over 20 years in the Court of Common Pleas of Philadelphia, in Pennsylvania's First Judicial District. She served for seven years in its Commerce Case Management Program, a specialized business court docket, including three years as its supervising judge. She handled a number of high-profile cases, such as a dispute over control of Philadelphia's major newspaper and the distribution of over $125 million from a tobacco settlement.

== Judicial service ==
McInerney was a trial judge on the Philadelphia Court of Common Pleas from 1996 until her retirement in 2018. After joining the court in 1996, she was successful in ten-year retention elections in 2005 and 2015. She originally served in the court's criminal division, and later in the general civil division.

In 2011, she was assigned by administrative judge John W. Herron to the Commerce Case Management Program (Commerce Court) to replace the late Albert W. Sheppard Jr. The Commerce Court is a business court docket within the Court of Common Pleas civil trial division, with a specialized jurisdiction primarily focused on business and commercial disputes. McInerney became one of three specialist judges assigned to this program, eventually being appointed its supervising judge in February 2016, a position she held until her 2018 retirement. She had earlier served for a short period in Commerce Court in 2001, making her the first woman to serve as a judge in the Commerce Court.

Among her most notable cases, McInerney ruled that Pennsylvania was due $125 million more than arbitrators had allowed from a tobacco master settlement agreement, a decision that was upheld on appeal in 2014.

McInerney was the judge in the bitter dispute among the ownership of The Philadelphia Inquirer. The battle was primarily between Lewis Katz and Gerry Lenfest on the one hand, and George Norcross, seeking control over Philadelphia's major daily newspaper. Among her rulings, McInerney rejected a request that she defer from resolving the dispute in Philadelphia's courts in favor of adjudication in the Delaware Court of Chancery; and she reversed the firing of the Inquirer's editor, Bill Marimow, which was the specific issue in the litigation.

There are approximately 100 of her Commerce Court opinions and orders posted on the Court of Common Pleas judicial opinion webpages.

== Legal practice ==
McInerney was admitted to the practice of law in Pennsylvania in 1981. She was an attorney at the Defender Association of Philadelphia from 1981 to 1987, after which she went into private legal practice. Since retiring as a judge in 2018, she provides services as an arbitrator, mediator, and referee/special master with the private alternative dispute resolution provider JAMS.

== Education ==
McInerney received a Bachelor of Arts, with honors, and Masters of Arts from Colgate University. She received her Juris Doctor degree from Temple University School of Law (now Temple University James E. Beasley School of Law) in 1981.

From 1999 to 2017, McInerney was an adjunct professor in trial advocacy at Temple University Beasley School of Law.

== Awards, honors, and positions ==
McInerney has received the following honors or held the following positions, among others;

- Distinguished Leaders Award from The Legal Intelligencer (2017)
- Inaugural portrait, Philadelphia LGBTQ Bar Association's Judicial Portrait Project (2023)
- Business Court Representative, American Bar Association Business Law Section (2013-2015)
- President, Temple American Inn of Court (2018-2019)
- Member, Board of Advisors, Pennsylvanians for Modern Courts (2021-2023)
- Member, Pennsylvania state trial judge ethics committee
- Member, American College of Business Court Judges
