= Karen S. Marston =

American judge (born 1968)

Karen Spencer Marston
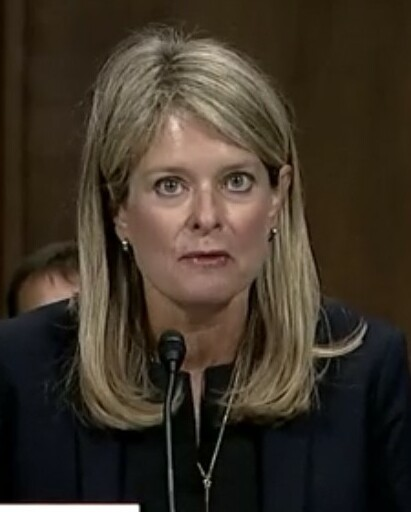

Judge of the United States District Court for the Eastern District of Pennsylvania
- Incumbent
- Assumed office December 20, 2019
- Appointed by: Donald Trump
- Preceded by: Legrome D. Davis

Personal details
- Born: 1968 (age 57–58) Portsmouth, Virginia
- Education: Davidson College (BA); Wake Forest University (JD)

Karen Spencer Marston (born 1968) is a United States district judge of the United States District Court for the Eastern District of Pennsylvania.

== Education ==
Marston earned her Bachelor of Arts from Davidson College in 1990 and her Juris Doctor, magna cum laude, from Wake Forest University School of Law in 1998, where she served as an Articles Editor on the Wake Forest Law Review.

== Legal and teaching career ==
Marston previously served as an Assistant United States Attorney in the United States Attorney's Office for the Western District of North Carolina from 2000 to 2006, receiving the Department of Justice Director's Award in 2002. From 2010 to 2019, she served as an Assistant United States Attorney in the United States Attorney's Office for the Eastern District of Pennsylvania, where she was the Chief of the Office's Narcotics and Organized Crime section from 2018 to 2019. She has also served as an adjunct professor at Temple University Beasley School of Law.

== Federal judicial service ==
On August 14, 2019, President Donald Trump announced his intent to nominate Marston to serve as a United States district judge for the United States District Court for the Eastern District of Pennsylvania. On September 9, 2019, her nomination was sent to the Senate. President Trump nominated Marston to the seat vacated by Judge Legrome D. Davis, who assumed senior status on September 28, 2017. Her nomination was praised by both Senators Bob Casey Jr. and Pat Toomey. On September 11, 2019, a hearing on her nomination was held before the Senate Judiciary Committee. On October 24, 2019, her nomination was reported out of committee by a 19–3 vote. On December 18, 2019, the United States Senate invoked cloture on her nomination by a 85–7 vote. On December 19, 2019, her nomination was confirmed by a 87–6 vote. She received her judicial commission on December 20, 2019.

== Memberships ==
She has been a member of the Federalist Society since 2019.

Legal offices
Preceded by Legrome D. Davis	Judge of the United States District Court for the Eastern District of Pennsylvania; 2019–present	Incumbent
