= Cynthia Baldwin =

American judge (born 1945)

Justice of the Supreme Court of Pennsylvania
- In office February 15, 2006 – January 7, 2008
- Appointed by: Ed Rendell
- Preceded by: Russell M. Nigro
- Succeeded by: Debra Todd

Allegheny County Court judge
- In office 1989–2006

Personal details
- Born: Cynthia Anita Ackron Baldwin; February 8, 1945 (age 81) McKeesport, Pennsylvania
- Party: Democratic
- Spouse: Arthur L. Baldwin
- Education: Duquesne University Pennsylvania State University

Cynthia Anita Ackron Baldwin (born February 8, 1945) is an American jurist who was a justice of the Pennsylvania Supreme Court after serving sixteen years as a Pennsylvania County Court judge. Baldwin was the first African-American woman elected to the Allegheny County Court of Common Pleas and the second African-American woman to serve on the Pennsylvania Supreme Court. She retired from the Pennsylvania Supreme Court in 2008. After her retirement from the Court, she became a partner with Duane Morris and served as the first General Counsel for the Pennsylvania State University.

As the first general counsel for the Pennsylvania State University she gained some national attention during the Penn State child sex abuse scandal. In 2020, Baldwin was publicly reprimanded by the Supreme Court of Pennsylvania for her role in the scandal.

Baldwin has been awarded the ATHENA Award, the Heinz History Center History Maker Award and the History Makers Award. She is also the recipient of several honorary doctorates. In recognition of contributions, she is featured on Marquis Who's Who Lifetime Achievers website.

== Education ==
Cynthia Baldwin received both her bachelor's degree (in English) and her master's degree (in American literature) from Penn State. After working as a teacher, English professor and assistant dean of student affairs at Penn State's Greater Allegheny Campus, she subsequently earned her juris doctor degree from Duquesne University School of Law. At Duquesne she was a member of the law review and is now a board member emerita.

== Legal career ==
In 1983, Baldwin worked as the prosecuting attorney-in-charge in the Office of the Attorney General at the Bureau of Consumer Protection. She rose to the bench in 1989, when she became the first black woman elected to the Allegheny County Court of Common Pleas. Baldwin served in this office for sixteen years. Then, in 2006, she was appointed to the state Supreme Court by Governor Ed Rendell. She retired from the court in January 2008. After retiring from the Pennsylvania Supreme Court, but before becoming Penn State's General Counsel, she became a partner in the international law firm of Duane Morris, LLP. There, her focus was on appellate litigation and not-for-profit issues.

Baldwin is an alumnus of Penn State, and served as the president of its alumni association from 1989 to 1991. She also served as Chair of the Penn State Board of Trustees from 2004 to 2007.

In January 2010, she was recruited to come to Penn State as the university's first general counsel, establish the Office of General Counsel and assist in recruiting a permanent general counsel. In that capacity, she became involved in the Jerry Sandusky scandal. News reports in July 2012 indicated that Baldwin, in her capacity as General Counsel, recommended that then-Penn State president Graham Spanier reject calls for an independent body overseeing the school's athletic programs. Additionally, her role was questioned in the case of the potential criminal cases against Penn State Athletic Director Tim Curley. When Curley appeared before the grand jury, he told court officials that Baldwin was his attorney, but she stated that she was only representing the university on that occasion;

On April 9, 2013, Judge Barry Feudale issued a 16-page ruling rejecting Spanier's, Schultz's and Curley's request to omit Presentment 29 from the investigation. In denying the motion to throw out Baldwin's testimony, Feudale ruled that he did not have jurisdiction to quash the presentment but, if it were decided that jurisdiction did fall to him, that he did not believe Baldwin's testimony violated any attorney-client privileges. Feudale further stated in his Opinion:[w]hen attorney Baldwin appeared before this court with witness[es] Curley and Schultz, the court was aware attorney Baldwin was General Counsel, Chief Legal Officer and Vice President of PSU." Feudale also stated that senior executives of an organization, like Schultz, Curley and Spanier, are usually represented by that organization's counsel. Feudale further wrote that "Spanier, Curley and Schultz are "highly educated" men who had positions of considerable influence at PSU as well as inferentially, knowledge about important events that impact the reputation of the university; and it therefore strains credulity to infer that they were somehow deluded or misrepresented by attorney Baldwin." Feudale went on to state that he believed that the defendants' motion "lacks merit in fact and law".

In his Opinion, Feudale confirmed that he was not advised, and he had no reason to believe, that Schultz and Curley were targets of the investigation. Feudale also acknowledged that there was persuasive evidence that Schultz, Curley and Spanier withheld relevant evidence from Baldwin. Curley, Penn State's former athletic director, and Gary Schultz, retired vice president for finance and business have been arrested and charged by the Pennsylvania Office of Attorney General for allegedly perjuring themselves before the grand jury about what they knew about the Sandusky affair. The charges include perjury, obstruction of justice and endangering the welfare of a child. Curley, along with Schultz, Graham Spanier and Coach Joe Paterno had also been cited by the Freeh Report as engaging in a cover up of Sandusky's abuse activities.

In 2016, the Pennsylvania Superior Court overruled the lower court although Baldwin had not been permitted to intervene, was not a party or a participant, and was granted no due process rights. In November 2017, the Office of Disciplinary Counsel of the Disciplinary Board of the Supreme Court of Pennsylvania filed a Petition for Discipline against Baldwin. A Hearing Committee was appointed by the Disciplinary Board to hear the matter and, in October 2018, issued a Report and Recommendation that no rule violation was found. The Disciplinary Board heard oral argument from both parties in January 2019. In March 2019, the Disciplinary Board issued its Report and Recommendation to the Pennsylvania Supreme Court, recommending Baldwin be subjected to a Public Censure by the Supreme Court. The Supreme Court heard oral argument from both parties in September 2019. In February 2020, the Supreme Court issued an Opinion imposing discipline in the form of a public reprimand, which was administered by the Disciplinary Board on July 22, 2020.

Craig McCoy of "The Philadelphia Inquirer" published an investigative article on July 23, 2020, that revealed the release of the affidavit sworn by Barry Feudale, the Grand Jury Judge in the Sandusky case. The affidavit was dated 2019, roughly four years after Judge Feudale had been removed from his position as Grand Jury Judge in the wake of allegations that he had lost his objectivity. According to the affidavit, Judge Feudale had been approached by Pennsylvania Supreme Court Justice Tom Saylor seven years earlier, in July 2012, for a "private conversation". According to the affidavit, Justice Saylor stated "that he was aware of the Grand Jury's work on the Penn State matter and that a 'lawyer's disciplinary complaint' was forthcoming against Cynthia Baldwin as a result of her actions in that investigation. The affidavit further stated that Judge Feudale had no information about such a complaint but that Justice Saylor was clear that it would be investigated. According to the affidavit, Justice Saylor specifically stated that he expected Judge Feudale to assist in every way with providing information in support of the disciplinary investigation. Judge Feudale's affidavit stated "I was stunned."

== Other activities ==
Baldwin is a former Fulbright lecturer at the University of Zimbabwe in 1994, where she lectured and conducted research on constitutional issues for the Zimbabwe Supreme Court prior to the changes made by President Robert Mugabe. She has also worked on many worldwide ethics issues including participating in anti-corruption projects for developing nations through the Brookings Institution.

Since 2017, Baldwin is serving for a second time on the Fulbright Association Board in Washington, D.C. After serving as Secretary and Vice Chair, Baldwin was elected as Chair of the Fulbright Association Board as of January 1, 2022.

== Civic and professional activities ==
- Director, Member of Audit Committee and Member of Safety, Health & Environmental Committee Koppers
- Board member, Pittsburgh Chapter of National Association of Corporate Directors
- Board member, Vibrant Pittsburgh
- Advisory Board member, Penn State Greater Allegheny
- Baldwin is active with the International Women's Forum and the International Association of Women Judges

== Publications ==
- "Combating Judicial Corruption in Uganda", 2009
- "All About Family Court," An Answer and Activity Book for Children in Court, 1999.
- "Avoiding Abuse, (of and under state and federal acts)," Pittsburgh Legal Journal, p. 1, Dec. 1994

== See also ==
- List of African-American jurists
