= Williams v. Pennsylvania =

- Supreme Court of the United States

Argued February 29, 2016 Decided June 9, 2016
- Full case name: Terrance Williams, Petitioner v. Pennsylvania
- Docket no.: 15-5040
- Citations: 579 U.S. 1 (more) 136 S. Ct. 1899; 195 L. Ed. 2d 132
- Opinion announcement: Opinion announcement

Case history
- Prior: Commonwealth v. Williams, 629 Pa. 533, 105 A.3d 1234 (2014); cert. granted, 136 S. Ct. 28 (2015).

Holding
- Chief Justice Castille's denial of the recusal motion and his subsequent judicial participation violated the Due Process Clause of the Fourteenth Amendment.

Court membership
- Chief Justice John Roberts Associate Justices Anthony Kennedy · Clarence Thomas; Ruth Bader Ginsburg · Stephen Breyer; Samuel Alito · Sonia Sotomayor; Elena Kagan

Case opinions
- Majority: Kennedy, joined by Ginsburg, Breyer, Sotomayor, Kagan
- Dissent: Roberts, joined by Alito
- Dissent: Thomas

Laws applied
- U.S. Const. amends. VIII, XIV

Williams v. Pennsylvania, 579 U.S. 1 (2016), was a United States Supreme Court case in which the court held that a prosecutor involved in seeking the death penalty for a defendant should recuse himself if asked to judge an appeal in the capital case.

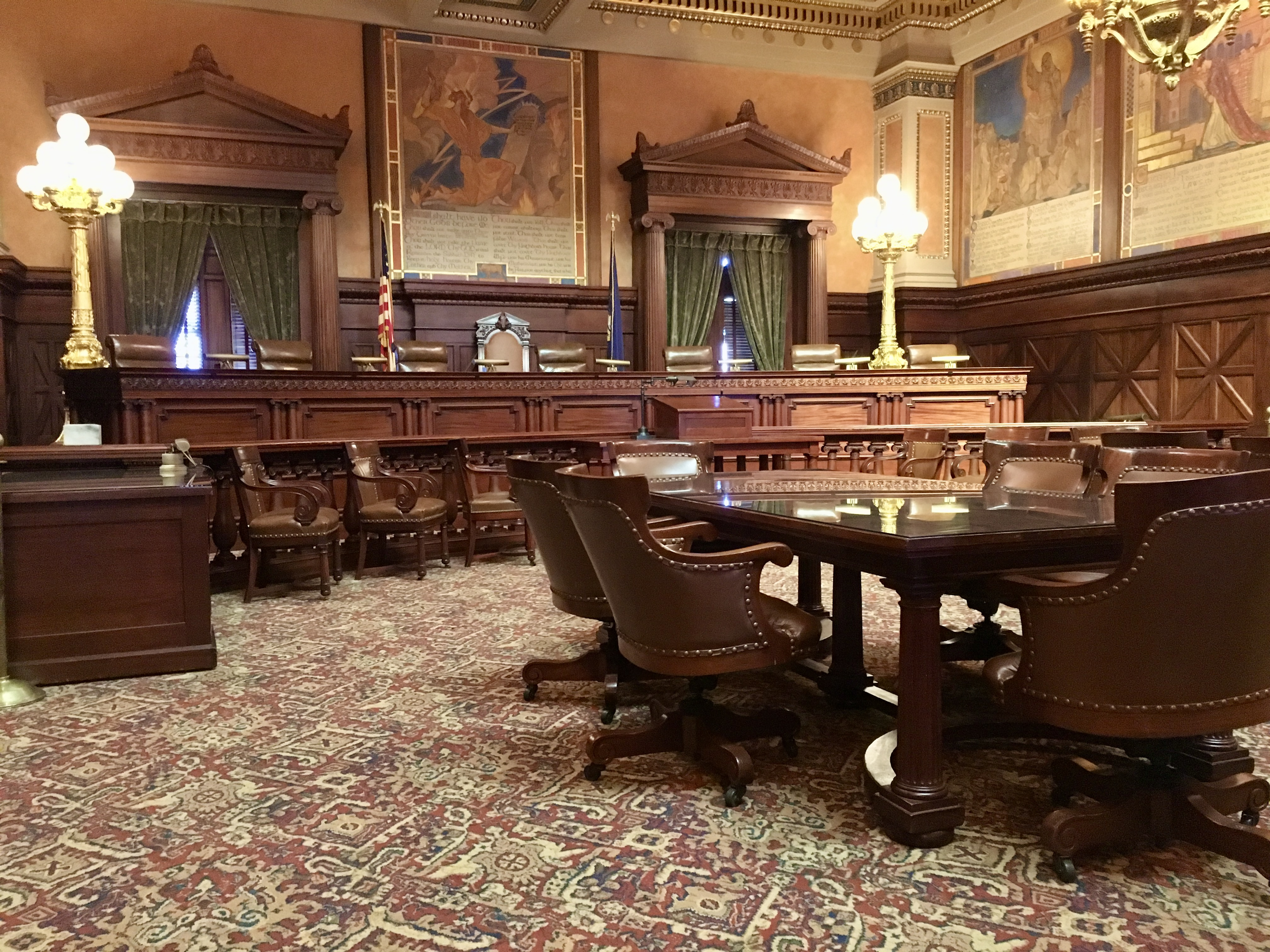
Pennsylvania Supreme Court chambers.

== Background ==
Terrance Williams was convicted and sentenced to death for the murder and robbery of Amos Norwood and then appealed to the Supreme Court of Pennsylvania. The case came at a time when there was a growing movement to get rid of the death penalty in Pennsylvania entirely. He appealed to the Supreme Court for claiming there is judicial bias against him. The chief justice of the state court by that point was Ronald Castille, who had been the local District Attorney of Philadelphia throughout Williams' trial, sentencing, and appeal, and who had personally authorized his office to seek the death penalty in this case. The attorneys for Williams asked the justice to recuse himself but Castille refused.

Facing execution in 2012, one of Williams’ closest friends, Marc Draper, admitted that he was forced to remain silent during the trial. Instead the prosecutors had told him that he had to testify and say that the murder of Amos Norwood was part of a robbery. There was also reports that the prosecutors withheld evidence that Draper had given a false testimony. There was even parts of the case where the Pennsylvania Government also withheld evidence and made false arguments that denied Williams a fair trial.

The case was won and Terrance Williams was not executed, but given life without parole instead.

== Opinion of the court ==
Associate Justice Anthony Kennedy authored the majority opinion.
