= Angel Mendez =

USMC Navy Cross recipient (1946–1967)

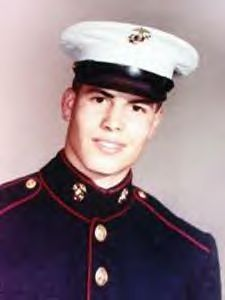
- Sgt. Angel Mendez
- Born: August 8, 1946; Fajardo, Puerto Rico
- Died: March 16, 1967 (aged 20); Đức Phổ District, South Vietnam
- Burial place: Mount Loretto Home Cemetery in Pleasant Plains, Staten Island, New York City, New York, U.S.
- Military career
- Allegiance: United States of America
- Branch: United States Marine Corps
- Service years: 1964–1967
- Rank: Sergeant
- Units: Company F, 2nd Battalion, 7th Marines, 1st Marine Division
- Conflicts: Vietnam War: Operation Desoto †
- Awards: Navy Cross; Purple Heart

Angel Mendez (August 8, 1946 – March 16, 1967) was a United States Marine who was posthumously awarded the Navy Cross. In 1967, during the Vietnam War, Mendez saved the life of his platoon commander, Lieutenant Ronald D. Castille, who would become the Chief Justice of Pennsylvania.

== Early years ==
Mendez' parents were Antonio Méndez Pomales, a native of Fajardo and Martina Rivera García from Naguabo with their eight children. They moved from Puerto Rico to New York City seeking a better life. His father owned and attended a grocery store in the South Bronx while his mother cared for their eight children at home. When Mendez' mother became ill and the family's economic situation worsened, his father could not raise him and his siblings, therefore 2 were sent to foster homes and 6 were placed in the Mission of the Immaculate Virgin, an orphanage on Mount Loretto, Staten Island. There he received his primary and secondary education. Mendez was a member of the cadet corps along with his brothers and many of the "Mount" kids. At a young age, he became fascinated with military life and with his friends would often imagine that he was on a "patrol" while camping at Stokes State Forest and Worthington State Forest.

In 1964, he volunteered to join the Marine Corps right after graduating from high school. Mendez received his basic training at Marine Corps Recruit Depot Parris Island, South Carolina. After he graduated from his recruit training, he was sent to Marine Corps Base Camp Lejeune, North Carolina to attend the School of Infantry. Mendez was assigned to Delta Company, 1st Battalion, 26th Marine Regiment, 1st Marine Division at Marine Corps Base Camp Pendleton in California.

== Vietnam War ==
=== Operation Desoto ===
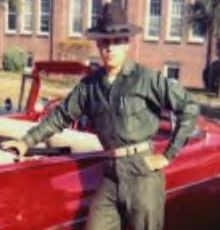
Cpl. Angel Mendez (1966)

Upon his deployment to South Vietnam, Mendez was assigned to Company F, 2nd Battalion, 7th Marines, 1st Marine Division.

Operation Desoto, was initiated on 27 January 1967 in the Đức Phổ District of Quảng Ngãi Province. The 2nd Battalion 7th Marines was part of the Special Landing Force (SLF) and took part in operations throughout the Marines Corps area of responsibility and saw extensive action throughout the 4-month-long operation. The 7th Marines, with elements of the 5th Marine Regiment, bore the brunt of most of the patrolling and contact with the enemy, whose presence continued in Chu Lai.

On March 16, 1967, Mendez was conducting a search and destroy mission with his company when they came under attack from a Viet Cong battalion. Half of his platoon was pinned down in a rice paddy under enemy fire, and Mendez volunteered to lead a squad to assist the pinned-down Marines in returning to friendly lines with their two dead and two seriously wounded men. Mendez exposed himself while returning fire with his M79 grenade launcher on the enemy. His platoon commander, Lieutenant Ronald D. Castille was seriously wounded and he fell, unable to move. Using his own body, Mendez shielded Lieutenant Castille as he applied a dressing to the wound, he then picked up the lieutenant and started to carry him to friendly lines, which were more than seventy-five meters away. Mendez was hit in the shoulder and two of his comrades rushed to help him with their commander, Mendez however refused to let go of his platoon commander and chose to act as rear man. Mendez continued to shield his lieutenant with his own body until he was mortally wounded. Mendez was posthumously awarded the Navy Cross and promoted to sergeant.

== Navy Cross citation ==
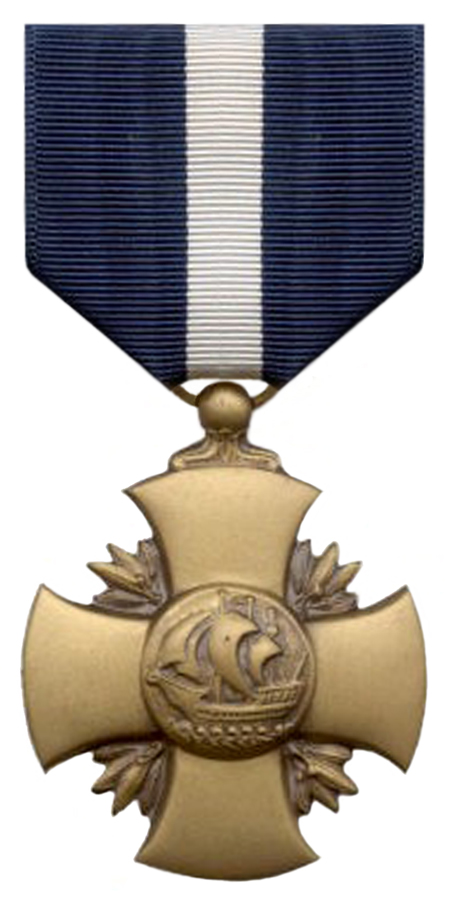

The President of the United States takes pride in presenting the NAVY CROSS posthumously to:

SERGEANT ANGEL MENDEZ
UNITED STATES MARINE CORPS

for service as set forth in the following citation:

For extraordinary heroism while serving as a Platoon Right Guide of the Third Platoon, Company F, Second Battalion, Seventh Marines, in the Republic of Vietnam on 16 March 1967. During Operation DE SOTO in Quang Ngai Province, Company F was conducting a search and destroy mission when the rear elements of the company were taken under intense 50-caliber machine gun and automatic weapons fire from an estimated hard-core Viet Cong battalion. One half of the Second Platoon was pinned down in an open rice paddy and all attempts to relieve the pressure on the beleaguered Marines had proven futile. Sergeant (then Corporal) Mendez, unhesitatingly volunteered to lead a squad into the face of the devastating and extremely accurate machine gun fire to assist the pinned-down Marines in returning to friendly lines with their two dead and two seriously wounded. The Viet Cong fire increased to a fever pitch as Sergeant Mendez calmly and courageously moved out onto a paddy dike, completely exposed to the intense fire, and commenced firing his M-79 at the enemy positions with deadly accuracy. He fired round after round as he stood, bravely defying the enemy, to give covering fire to his comrades. Sixty meters across the rice paddy from Sergeant Mendez, his Platoon Commander was seriously wounded and he fell, unable to move. Immediately Sergeant Mendez raced through the hail of bullets to his Platoon Commander's side. Shielding him with his body as he applied a dressing to the wound, he picked up the Lieutenant and started to carry him to friendly lines, which were more than seventy-five meters away. Exhibiting exceptional courage he moved toward the lines as the Viet Cong attempted to hit this double target. Twenty meters short of his goal, he was hit in the shoulder and two of his comrades ran out to assist him. Even though painfully wounded, Sergeant Mendez chose to be the rear man, refusing to relinquish his hold on his Lieutenant's legs as they carried him toward the hedgerow. He was shielding his Lieutenant with his own body when he was mortally wounded. By his dauntless courage, initiative and selfless efforts on behalf of another, Sergeant Mendez saved his Platoon Commander's life and upheld the highest traditions of the Marine Corps and of the United States Naval Service. He gallantly gave his life for his country.

== Legacy ==
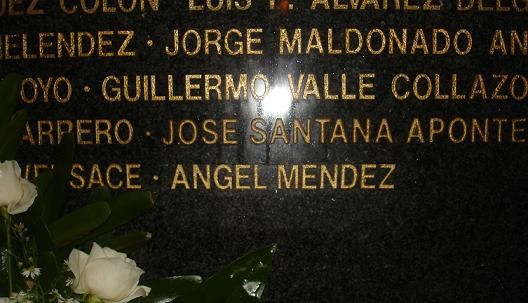
Name of Sgt. Angel Mendez inscribed in "El Monumento de la Recordación"

In March 1967, Mendez's body was sent to Puerto Rico for funeral services upon the request of his father. Mendez's siblings believed that their brother should be buried in New York and two weeks later, his body was sent to Staten Island where he was buried with full military honors on the grounds of the mission where he grew up at Mount Loretto. He was survived by his parents and his siblings, Ismael, Edwin, Carmen, Anibal, Maria, Betty and Anthony. The name of Angel Mendez is inscribed on the Vietnam Veterans Memorial ("The Wall") on Panel 16E – Line 94.

Senator Charles Schumer, senior U.S. Senator from the state of New York prompted by the men of the Island's Marine Corps League detachment and supported by the man whom Mendez saved, the Honorable Ronald D. Castille, former district attorney of Philadelphia and now Chief Justice of Pennsylvania, called for Mendez to be recognized with the highest military honor of the United States, the Medal of Honor in 2003.

The request lacked some vital information and in 2003, a meeting was held in Mt. Loretto, by Mr. Al Richichi, President and the Board of managers of the Mt. Loretto Alumni Association, Bruce W. Barraclough, Sr., John C. Gallo and Ismael Mendez and his wife Aida Mendez next of kin to Angel Mendez. This meeting was held to bring those involved up to date on the intentions of Barraclough and Gallo quest to honor Angel Mendez, and to get the family's permission to submit a new request for the Medal of Honor. In October, 2003 Barraclough and Gallo had finished writing up the new request which had presented only the facts, and added a petition signed by many organizations, Society's, along with many signatures from Staten Island, New Yorkers.

On January 14, 2008, the Honorable Ronald D. Castille was sworn in as Chief Justice of Pennsylvania. In his speech he is quoted as saying the following:

"I remember my Platoon Sgt. Angel Mendez, a Marine who was raised in an orphanage in Staten Island and who called the Marine Corps his family. It was Sgt. Mendez who braved heavy enemy machine gun fire to pull me to safety as I lay wounded in that rice paddy in Vietnam at Duc Pho while leading my own Marines in an effort to bring in other wounded and fallen Marines to safety in Operation DeSoto. Angel saved my life that day, but he was mortally wounded and was posthumously awarded the Navy Cross, the second highest medal awarded by the Marine Corps for personal bravery. NY Senator Charles Schumer is now leading an effort to upgrade Angel's Navy Cross to the Medal of Honor."

On May 26, 2008, during the Memorial Day celebrations held in San Juan, Puerto Rico, the inscription of the name of Angel Mendez in "El Monumento de la Recordación" (Monument of Remembrance) was unveiled. The monument is dedicated to Puerto Rico's fallen military members and situated in front of the Capitol Building. The unveiling was done by then Puerto Rico Senate President Kenneth McClintock and PR National Guard Adjutant General Col. David Carrión.

A bill (H.R. 2422), that would permit the naming of the St. George, Staten Island Post Office, located at 45 Bay Street, after Mendez was approved by the US House of Representatives on November 14, 2011. The bill was introduced by US Congressman Michael G. Grimm, representative of New York's 13th District, and cosponsored by every House member of the New York congressional delegation. The Bill was signed off on legislation by President Obama and the St. George Post Office was renamed to the Sergeant Angel Mendez Post Office.

Remembered as a "son of Staten Island", in 2017 a military-style ceremony was held by the Catholic Church at Mount Loretto to acknowledge the 50th anniversary of his death.

In July 2019, the South Richmond High School in Pleasant Plains that he attended as a child in Staten Island was renamed the "Sgt. Angel Mendez Learning Center" in his honor.

== Awards and decorations ==
Among Angel Mendez's awards and decorations are the following

1st Row	Navy Cross		
2nd Row	Purple Heart	Navy and Marine Corps Commendation Medal with Combat "V"	Combat Action Ribbon
3rd Row	Navy Presidential Unit Citation	Navy Unit Commendation	Navy Meritorious Unit Commendation
4th Row	Marine Corps Good Conduct Medal	National Defense Service Medal	Vietnam Service Medal with one (1) bronze service star
5th Row	Vietnam Military Merit Medal	Vietnam Wound Medal	Republic of Vietnam Civil Actions Medal 2nd Class
6th Row	Vietnam Gallantry Cross Unit Citation	Vietnam Civil Actions Medal Unit Citation	Vietnam Campaign Medal

Others

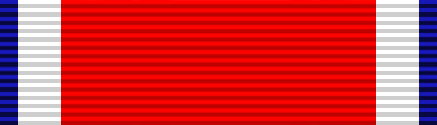
- New York State Conspicuous Service Cross Medal with Silver Cross Device
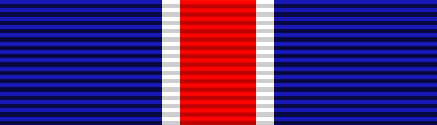
- New York State Conspicuous Service Star Medal

== See also ==
- Hispanics in the United States Marine Corps
- List of Navy Cross recipients for the Vietnam War
- List of Puerto Rican military personnel
- List of Puerto Ricans
- Puerto Rican recipients of the Navy Cross
