= Edmund V. Ludwig =

American judge

Senior Judge of the United States District Court for the Eastern District of Pennsylvania
- In office May 20, 1997 – May 17, 2016

Judge of the United States District Court for the Eastern District of Pennsylvania
- In office October 17, 1985 – May 20, 1997
- Appointed by: Ronald Reagan
- Preceded by: Raymond J. Broderick
- Succeeded by: Legrome D. Davis

Personal details
- Born: Edmund V. Ludwig; May 20, 1928 Philadelphia, Pennsylvania
- Died: May 17, 2016 (aged 87) Doylestown, Pennsylvania
- Party: Republican
- Education: Harvard University (A.B.); Harvard Law School (LL.B.)

Edmund V. Ludwig (May 20, 1928 – May 17, 2016) was a United States district judge of the United States District Court for the Eastern District of Pennsylvania.

== Early life and education ==
Born in Philadelphia, Pennsylvania, Ludwig received an Artium Baccalaureus degree from Harvard University in 1949 and a Bachelor of Laws from Harvard Law School in 1952. He was a Reserve Captain in the Army JAG Corps from 1953 to 1956, before returning to private practice in Philadelphia, and later Doylestown, Pennsylvania.

== Legal career ==
Ludwig was elected a Judge on the Bucks County Court of Common Pleas in 1968, and went to serve as a Clinical associate professor at Hahnemann University, and a visiting lecturer at Temple University Beasley School of Law in the late 1970s and early 1980s. Ludwig also briefly served as a member of the University of Pennsylvania's faculty in the early 1980s, and held a variety of positions at Villanova University School of Law in the late 1970s.

== Federal judicial service ==
Ludwig was nominated by President Ronald Reagan to a seat on the United States District Court for the Eastern District of Pennsylvania on June 21, 1985. The seat was vacated by the retiring former Lieutenant Governor Raymond J. Broderick. He was confirmed by the United States Senate on October 16, 1985, and received his commission on October 17, 1985. He assumed senior status on May 20, 1997, serving in that status until his death on May 17, 2016, in Doylestown, Pennsylvania.

Legal offices
Preceded by Raymond J. Broderick	Judge of the United States District Court for the Eastern District of Pennsylvania; 1985–1997	Succeeded by Legrome D. Davis
