= Hope Point Tower =

Skyscraper in Rhode Island, U.S.

- Interactive map of the Hope Point Tower area
- Former names: Fane Tower

General information
- Status: Never built
- Location: Jewelry District, Providence, Rhode Island, United States, 250 Dyer Street
- Coordinates: 41°49′15″N 71°24′28″W
- Construction started: N/A
- Completed: N/A
- Owner: Jason Fane

Height
- Roof: 550ft (167m)

Technical details
- Floor count: 47

Design and construction
- Architects: Gianni Ria, IBI Group
- Developer: The Fane Organization

Hope Point Tower (also called Fane Tower) was a proposed skyscraper project in Providence, Rhode Island which consists of one 46-story residential tower.

Initially, three residential towers of varying height were proposed. The tallest two towers, at 604 feet (184m) and 485 feet (147m), were to have been the tallest skyscrapers in Rhode Island, and the principal tower would have been one of the tallest residential towers in New England. The current project is to be built on Parcel 42, an acre of vacant land between Dyer Street to its west and a planned riverfront park to its east, which was reclaimed after the moving of Interstate 195.

The design consists of a masonry and glass facade with some units having balconies. Amenities for residents would include a private movie theater and gym. The first floors will have shops and restaurants.

On July 25, 2017, the I-195 District Commission approved the construction of a single 46-story tower, conditional on zoning approval by the city.

On September 25, 2019, the I-195 District Commission approved the final design for the tower.

In June 2022 the Rhode Island Supreme Court affirmed a Superior Court decision permitting the zoning variance the city council provided for the building.

As of March 2023, the project was scrubbed according to its developer, Jason Fane, who stated the tower would not be built “due to recent risk factors outside my control”.
