= Terry Williams (murderer) =

American criminal

Terrance Williams
- 2026 Mugshot of Williams
- Born: February 27, 1966 (age 60); Pennsylvania, U.S.
- Status: Incarcerated
- Convictions: Third-degree murder (overturned); First-degree murder (1984)
- Penalty: Death; commuted to life imprisonment

Details
- Imprisoned at: State Correctional Institution – Phoenix

Terrance "Terry" Williams (born February 27, 1966) is a prisoner who was sentenced to death for a murder committed at the age of 18. He was also sentenced to 13.5 to 27 years for another murder he committed six months earlier. He was scheduled to be executed on October 3, 2012. However, on September 28, 2012, a Philadelphia judge Teresa Sarmina granted a stay of execution after finding that the prosecutor had suppressed evidence that the victim, whom the prosecutor had described as a "kind man", was a child molester who had been sexually abusing Williams since he was 13.

Williams had previously been tried for first degree murder in the death of his other victim, but was found guilty of third degree murder after jurors in that case were made aware that the 50-year-old victim was in a sexual relationship with Williams, who was then 17, which would qualify as statutory rape under Pennsylvania law.

Williams's death sentence was overturned on June 9, 2016, by the U.S. Supreme Court via Williams v. Pennsylvania, and he was resentenced to life imprisonment without parole.

In 2019, Williams's convictions in the death of his first victim were vacated after it was revealed that the prosecutor had withheld evidence proving that the victim was a sexual predator who possessed hundreds of photos of child pornography and suggesting that Williams may have killed him in self-defense.

== Murders of Hamilton and Norwood ==
In January 1984, Williams stabbed to death Herbert Hamilton, a 50-year-old resident of West Philadelphia. Williams was a 17-year-old at the time of the murder. Williams lured Hamilton to bed, then stabbed him over 20 times and beat him with a baseball bat.

As cited from court records: "Williams retrieved a nearby baseball bat, chased after [Herbert] Hamilton, and beat him with the bat until Hamilton was bloody and severely wounded. Williams then recovered the butcher knife and stabbed Hamilton approximately twenty times--twice in the head, ten times in the back, once in the neck, four times in the chest, and once each in the abdomen, arm, and thumb. Finally, Williams drove the butcher knife through the back of Hamilton's neck until it protruded through the other side. He then doused Hamilton's body with kerosene and unsuccessfully attempted to set fire to it."

Six months later, Williams, then 18, and Marc Draper convinced Amos Norwood to go to a cemetery, where they beat him to death with a tire iron and then hid the body behind some tombstones. Williams later returned and set the body on fire. Williams took Norwood's car, along with cash and credit cards he stole from the body, and drove to Atlantic City with Draper and Ronald Rucker.

Again citing from court records: "Williams exited the vehicle, approached Draper, and said quietly, "Play it off like you going home, like you want a ride home, and we gonna take some money." Draper understood Williams to be proposing a robbery. The two then got inside Norwood's automobile and Draper began to provide false directions to his "home." In reality, Draper's directions led Norwood to a secluded area adjacent to the Ivy Hill Cemetery. Once there, Draper reached over the backseat, grabbed Norwood from behind and ordered him "to be quiet and get out of the car." Norwood stopped the vehicle and complied.

Williams and Draper then led Norwood into the cemetery and ordered him to lie facedown near a tombstone. A quick search of Norwood's person revealed $20 hidden in his sock. At this point, Norwood began to plead for his life. The two assailants responded by removing Norwood's clothing and tying him up; Norwood's hands were bound behind his back with his shirt, his legs were bound together with his pants, and his socks were forcefully jammed into his mouth. Once Norwood was bound, Williams said to Draper, "Wait, I'm going to the car. We're getting ready to do something." And he walked off.

Williams returned with a tire iron and a socket wrench, the latter of which he gave to Draper. Draper, seemingly having second thoughts, urged Williams to leave. Williams replied, "I know what I'm doin, I know what I'm doin. Don't worry about it, I know what I'm doin." He then began battering Norwood's head with the tire iron. When he noticed that Draper was frozen in place, Williams said, "Man, you with me[?] We got to do this together." Draper then sprung into action himself, striking Norwood repeatedly with the socket wrench. This violent scene continued until Norwood lay motionless and dead."

== Arrest and trial ==
After the use of Norwood's calling card led police to Rucker, who in turn implicated Williams and Draper. Draper was arrested on July 20, 1984. During questioning, he gave a full confession to the police. A search was conducted of Williams residence, and Norwood's jacket was found. Williams surrendered to the police on July 23, 1984, and although Draper was in protective custody, was able to send several letters urging Draper to change his story. Draper instead turned the letters over to the police.

Williams was convicted of third degree murder, theft, and possession of an instrument of crime in the death of Hamilton and was sentenced to 13.5 to 27 years in prison. He was convicted of first degree murder in the death of Norwood and sentenced to death. For his role in the murder of Norwood, Draper was sentenced to life without the possibility of parole.

== Petition for commutation ==
A petition for commutation of his sentence by the Governor of Pennsylvania has been signed by nearly 150 former judges and prosecutors, child and health specialists, and former jurors at his trial. Williams, a victim of sexual abuse during his childhood, killed two of his alleged rapists. At his trials, the rapes were not mentioned. Jurors who signed the petition in September 2012 indicated that if they had been aware of the facts, they would not have requested the death penalty, but life in prison. The widow of Amos Norwood, the second person killed by Williams, also argued for a commutation of the sentence. On September 13, a bipartisan group, led by State Senator Daylin Leach, a Montgomery County Democrat, and State Senator Stewart Greenleaf, a Montgomery County Republican, asked Pennsylvania Governor, Tom Corbett, for clemency.

Barbara Harris, the daughter of Amos Norwood, disagrees. She says it is time for Williams' sentence to be carried out: "Abolishing the Death Penalty is a good thing. Refusing Terrance Williams the RIGHT TO DIE is not!!! No more extensions, serve justice to Williams now before he destroys another family."

== Aftermath ==
In 2019, Williams's lawyers were granted access to the prosecution file. They discovered that the prosecutor, Andrea Foulkes, had withheld exculpatory evidence in the case. There was a complete medical report with Williams's indicating that he may have killed Hamilton in self-defense. Williams was granted a new trial in May 2019, and the prosecution dismissed the case on January 29, 2020.

== In popular culture ==
- Terry's case was covered by the HLN series Death Row Stories episode "Predator or Prey?" which covered both the murder and the overturning of Terry's death sentence.
