= Ronald D. Castille =

American judge (1944–2026)

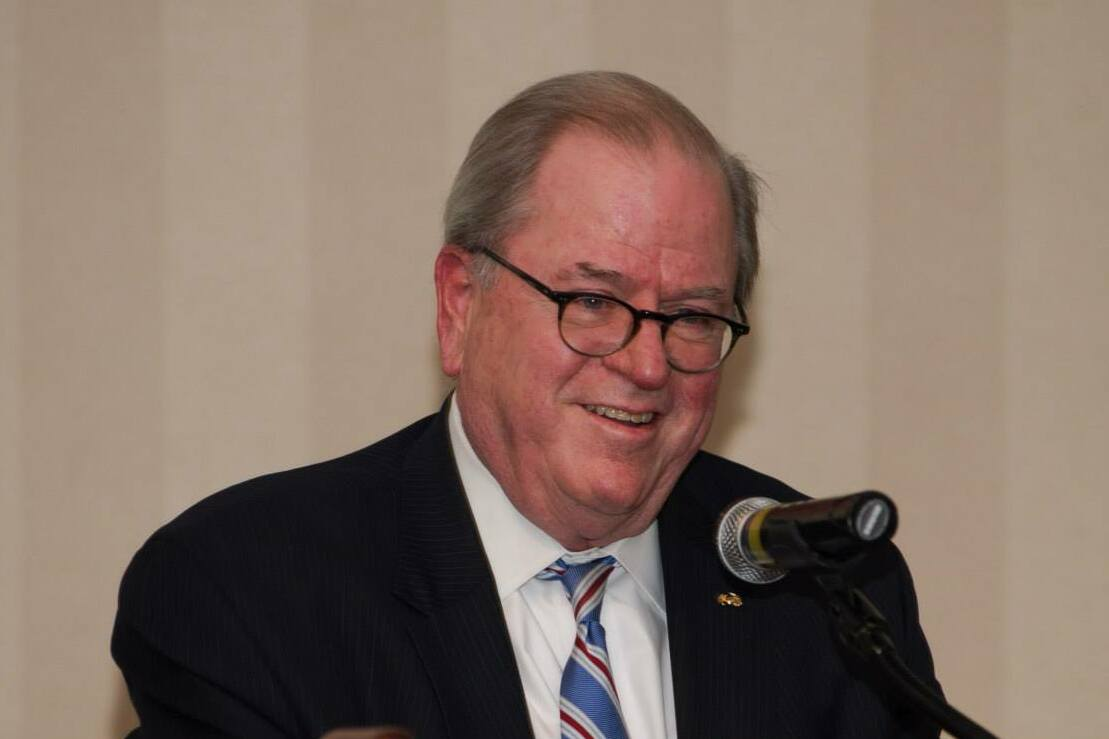

Chief Justice of Pennsylvania
- In office January 14, 2008 – December 31, 2014
- Preceded by: Ralph J. Cappy
- Succeeded by: Thomas G. Saylor

Justice of the Supreme Court of Pennsylvania
- In office January 3, 1994 – December 31, 2014
- Succeeded by: Kevin Dougherty

22nd District Attorney of Philadelphia, Pennsylvania
- In office January 6, 1986 – March 12, 1991
- Preceded by: Ed Rendell
- Succeeded by: Lynne Abraham

Personal details
- Born: March 16, 1944 Miami, Florida, U.S.
- Died: November 4, 2026 (aged 82)
- Education: Auburn University; University of Virginia School of Law

Military service
- Allegiance: United States of America
- Branch/service: United States Marine Corps
- Years of service: 1966–1968
- Battles/wars: Vietnam War

Ronald D. Castille (March 16, 1944 – November 4, 2026) was an American judge who served on the Supreme Court of Pennsylvania from 1994 to 2014 and was chief justice from 2008 to 2014. He stepped down from the court in 2014, after reaching the mandatory retirement age of 70.

Castille was the District Attorney of the City of Philadelphia from 1986 until 1991 and was a member of the Republican Party. He lost his right leg to enemy gunfire as a Marine platoon commander during the Vietnam War.

== Marine Corps service ==
Castille received a B.S. in economics from Auburn University in 1966. Following graduation was commissioned an officer in the United States Marine Corps in Vietnam, where he served as a platoon commander in 2nd Battalion, 7th Marines. On his 23rd birthday, March 16, 1967, Castille was conducting a search and destroy mission with his company in Đức Phổ, Quảng Ngãi province, when they came under attack from a Viet Cong battalion. During the fighting Castille was seriously wounded and fell, unable to move. One of his Marines, Angel Mendez, shielded him and then carried him to friendly lines, which were more than seventy-five meters away. During this action Mendez was hit in the shoulder, and two of his comrades rushed to help him with Castille, but Mendez refused to let go of Castille and chose to act as rear man. Mendez continued to shield his lieutenant with his own body until he was mortally wounded. For his actions Mendez was posthumously awarded the Navy Cross and promoted to sergeant.

== Judicial career ==
Following his medical retirement from the Marine Corps in 1968, Castille received his J.D. from the University of Virginia School of Law. Moving to Philadelphia 1971, District Attorney Arlen Specter hired Castille as an assistant district attorney. He served in that capacity for 14 years, from 1971 to 1985, rising to be a deputy district attorney in 1983. In 1985 he was elected District Attorney of Philadelphia and served from January, 1986 through 1991, when he ran for Mayor of Philadelphia. He narrowly lost in the Republican primary to former Democratic Mayor Frank Rizzo by 47,523 votes (36.45%) to 46,094 (35.35%). Prior to his election to the Supreme Court, he was in private practice as a civil litigator for Reed Smith Shaw & McClay in Philadelphia. He was elected to the Supreme Court of Pennsylvania in 1993.

On January 14, 2008, Castille was sworn in as Chief Justice of Pennsylvania. He retired at the mandatory age of 70 on March 16, 2014. Castille was elected to membership in the American Law Institute in 2014.

While Chief Justice, in his capacity as head administrator of the Pennsylvania courts, he hired Jeffrey B. Rotwitt to act as the courts' attorney in a project to build a new family courthouse in Philadelphia County. Journalists at The Philadelphia Inquirer revealed that Rotwitt was simultaneously acting as a business partner of the construction project's developer and was therefore involved on both sides of the transaction. Castille later claimed to have been duped by Rotwitt.

In 2012, Castille, a Republican, cast the deciding vote against the Pennsylvania Legislative Reapportionment Commission's redistricting map, siding with his Democratic colleagues. In his opinion, Castille wrote that the map split too many municipalities. He also wrote the unanimous opinion upholding the LRC's revised redistricting maps in 2013.

As district attorney, Castille frequently sought the death penalty, a point he used during his campaign for the Supreme Court. Castille personally authorized seeking the death penalty against Terry Williams, who had killed two men who sexually abused him as a child, but the sentence was overturned 25 years later because the prosecution deliberately withheld key facts. Castille's Supreme Court reinstated the sentence in 2015. On June 9, 2016, the U.S. Supreme Court concluded in Williams v. Pennsylvania, that "Chief Justice Castille's failure to recuse from Williams's case presented an unconstitutional risk of bias."

== Death ==
Ronald Castille died on November 4, 2026, at the age of 82.

== Awards and decorations ==
Among Ron Castille's awards and decorations are the following:

- Bronze Star (with Combat Valor Device)
- Purple Heart
- Navy Presidential Unit Citation
- Navy Unit Commendation
- Combat Action Ribbon
- National Defense Service Medal
- Vietnam Service Medal
- Republic of Vietnam Gallantry Cross
- Vietnam Campaign Medal

== See also ==
- Angel Mendez

== Notes ==
Legal offices
Preceded by Ralph J. Cappy	Chief Justice of Pennsylvania; 2008–2014	Succeeded by Thomas G. Saylor
Preceded by Ed Rendell	District Attorney of Philadelphia, Pennsylvania; 1986–1991	Succeeded by Lynne Abraham
