= Supreme Court of Pennsylvania =

Highest court in the U.S. state of Pennsylvania

- Interactive map of Supreme Court of Pennsylvania
- Established: May 22, 1722 (1684 as Provincial Court)
- Jurisdiction: Pennsylvania
- Location: Harrisburg 40°16′01″N 76°52′57″W; Philadelphia 39°57′09″N 75°09′47″W; Pittsburgh 40°26′17″N 79°59′49″W
- Composition method: partisan election with "Yes/No" retention election at end-of-term
- Authorised by: Constitution of Pennsylvania
- Appeals from: Superior Court of Pennsylvania; Commonwealth Court of Pennsylvania
- Judge term length: 10 years
- Number of positions: 7
- Website: Official website

Chief Justice
- Currently: Debra Todd
- Since: October 1, 2022

The Supreme Court of Pennsylvania is the highest court in the Commonwealth of Pennsylvania's Unified Judicial System. It began in 1684 as the Provincial Court, and casual references to it as the "Supreme Court" of Pennsylvania were made official in 1722 upon its reorganization as an entity separate from the control of the colonial governor. It is the oldest appellate court in the United States, a claim that is disputed by the Massachusetts Supreme Judicial Court.

The Supreme Court of Pennsylvania maintains a discretionary docket, meaning that the Court may choose which cases it accepts, with the exception of mandatory death penalty appeals, and certain appeals from the original jurisdiction of the Commonwealth Court. This discretion allows the Court to wield powerful influence on the formation and interpretation of Pennsylvania law.

== History ==
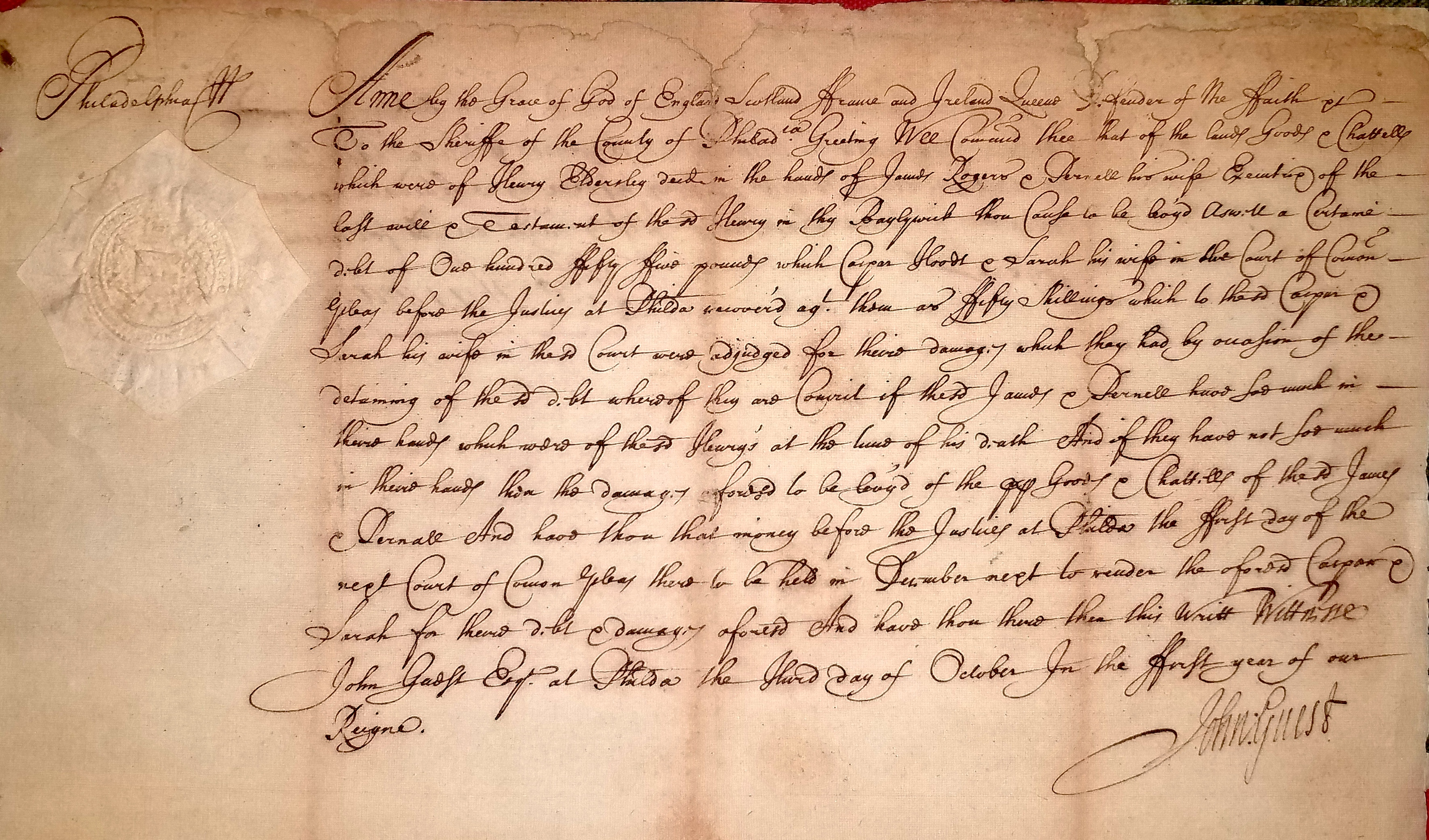
A writ signed in 1702 by then Provincial Court of Pennsylvania chief justice John Guest

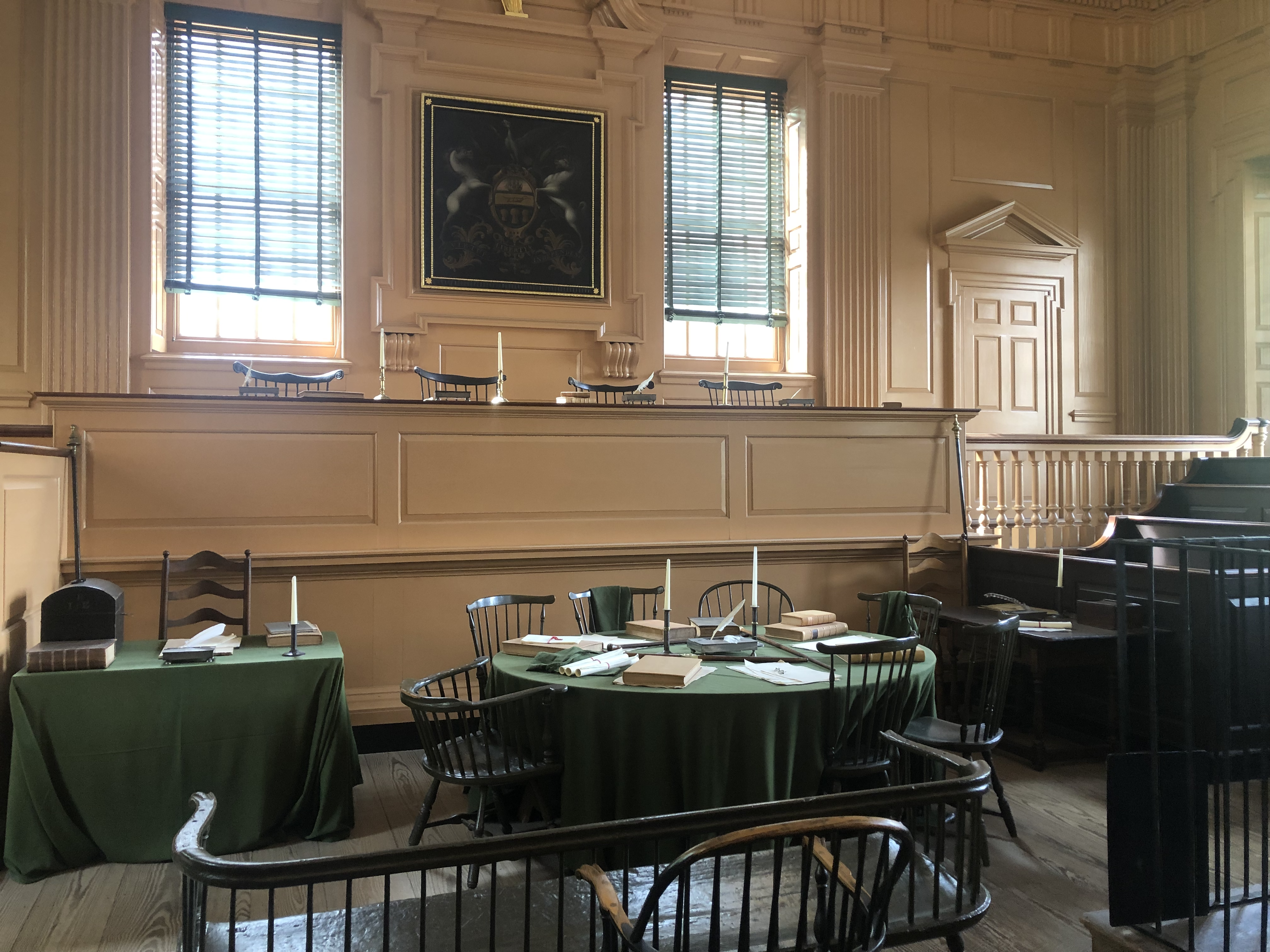
The original chambers of the Supreme Court of Pennsylvania in Independence Hall

The original Pennsylvania Constitution, drafted by William Penn, established a Provincial Court under the control of his British governors. The Provincial Assembly, however, espoused the principle of separation of powers and formally called for a third branch of government starting with the 1701 Judiciary Bill. In 1722, the appointed British governor needed the House to raise revenues. House leaders agreed to raise taxes in return for an independent Supreme Court. Until 1776, legislation and judicial decisions in Pennsylvania, as in various American colonies, were subject to review by the Privy Council of Great Britain in London.

Between 1780 and 1808, a Pennsylvania High Court of Errors and Appeals existed, which was the court of last resort in Pennsylvania. After that court's dissolution in 1808, the commonwealth's Supreme Court became, and remains, the court of last resort in the Pennsylvania judiciary.

The Supreme Court of Pennsylvania predates the United States Supreme Court by more than 100 years. Interpreting the Pennsylvania Constitution, it was possibly one of the first appellate courts in the United States to claim the power to declare laws made by an elected legislative body unconstitutional (Respublica v. Duquet, 2 Yeates 493 (1799)), potentially preceded only by Bayard v. Singleton, 1 N.C. 42 (1787).

== Composition and rules ==
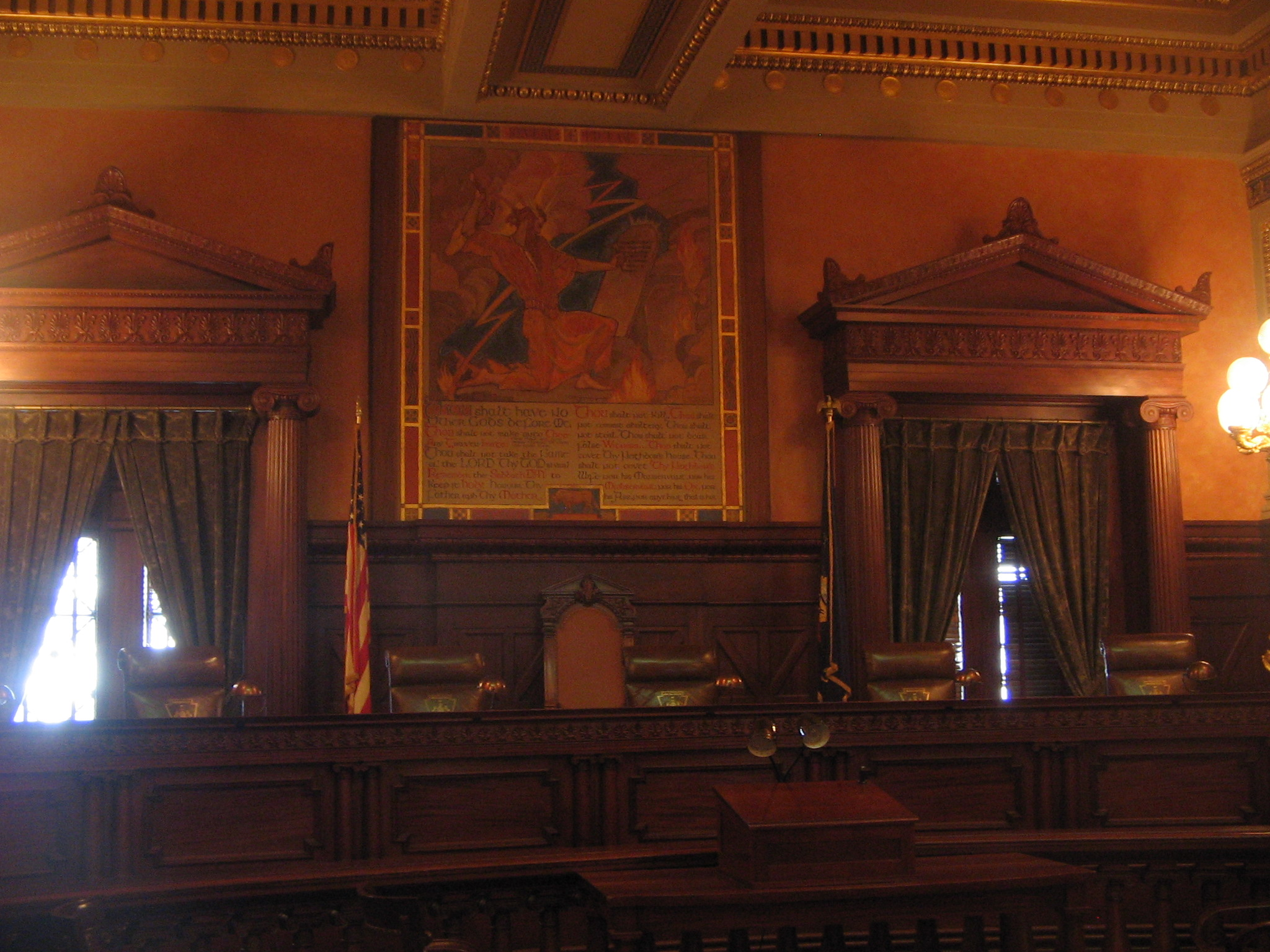
Justices' seats in the Pennsylvania Supreme Court's chambers in the Pennsylvania State Capitol in Harrisburg

The Supreme Court of Pennsylvania meets in three cities: Harrisburg, Philadelphia, and Pittsburgh.

The Court consists of seven justices, each elected to ten year terms. Supreme Court judicial candidates may run on party tickets. The justice with the longest continuous service on the Court automatically becomes chief justice. Justices must step down from the Supreme Court when they reach the age of 75 (at the end of the calendar year), but they may continue to serve part-time as "senior justices" on panels of the commonwealth's lower appellate courts until they reach 78, the age of mandatory retirement.

Prior to 2002, judicial candidates in Pennsylvania were prohibited from expressing their views on disputed legal or political issues. However, after a similar law in Minnesota was struck down as unconstitutional (Republican Party of Minnesota v. White), the Pennsylvania rules were amended, and judicial candidates may now express political viewpoints as long as they do not "commit or appear to commit the candidate with respect to cases, controversies or issues that are likely to come before the Court." (PA Code of Judicial Conduct, Canon 7 (B)(1)(c))

After the ten-year term expires, a statewide yes or no vote for retention is conducted. A judge who is retained serves another ten-year term. If the judge is not retained, the governor, subject to the approval of the State Senate, appoints a temporary replacement until a special election can be held. As of 2005, only one judge has failed to win retention. After the 2005 Pennsylvania General Assembly pay raise controversy, Justice Russell M. Nigro received a majority of no votes in the election of 2005. He was replaced by Justice Cynthia Baldwin, who was appointed by governor Ed Rendell in 2005.

Only one Supreme Court justice, Rolf Larsen, has been removed from office by impeachment. In 1994, the State House handed down articles of impeachment consisting of seven counts of misconduct. A majority of the State Senate voted against Larsen in five of the seven counts but only one charge garnered the two-thirds majority needed to convict.

Under the 1874 Constitution and until the Pennsylvania state Constitution of 1968, Supreme Court justices were elected to 21-year terms. At the time, it was the longest term of any elected office in the United States.

== Justices ==
The Supreme Court of Pennsylvania consists of seven members who are elected to ten-year terms as justices.

=== Current members ===
Name	Born	Start	Term ends	Mandatory retirement (Note: Justices must retire by the last day (December 31) of the calendar year in which they reach the age of 75.)	Party	Appointer	Law school
Debra Todd, Chief Justice	October 15, 1957 (age 69)	January 7, 2008 (Note: Justice Todd became the chief justice on November 1, 2022 due to the death of the previous chief justice, Max Baer.)	2027	2032	Democratic	—N/a (Note: Took office after being elected in a partisan election.)	Pittsburgh
Christine Donohue	December 24, 1952 (age 73)	January 4, 2016	2035	2027	Democratic	—N/a	Duquesne
Kevin Dougherty	May 19, 1962 (age 64)	January 4, 2016	2035	2037	Democratic	—N/a	Antioch
David Wecht	May 20, 1962 (age 64)	January 4, 2016	2035	2037	Independent	—N/a	Yale
Sallie Updyke Mundy	June 29, 1962 (age 64)	July 21, 2016	2027	2037	Republican	Tom Wolf (D)	Pittsburgh
Kevin Brobson	November 26, 1970 (age 55)	January 3, 2022	2031	2045	Republican	—N/a	Widener (PA)
Daniel McCaffery	July 20, 1964 (age 62)	January 1, 2024	2033	2039	Democratic	—N/a	Temple

== Notable cases ==
- Eakin v. Raub (1825), in which the Court held that it has the authority of judicial review over state laws if they contradict the state Constitution.
- Commonwealth v. Mimms (1975), in which the Court held that the unlawful possession charges as well as the relevant convictions and sentences against Harry Mimms over his illicit possession and concealed carry of an unlicensed firearm must be vacated and his case should be remanded for a new trial with the suppression of evidence due to violations of his Fourth Amendment rights; overturned by the Supreme Court of the United States in Pennsylvania v. Mimms, 434 U.S. 106 (1977).
- Commonwealth v. Williams (2014), in which the Court held that the stay of execution against Terrence "Terry" Williams is overturned despite the lack of recusal on the part of then chief justice of the Supreme Court of Pennsylvania Ronald D. Castille for his prosecution of Williams as a former district attorney of Philadelphia; overturned by the Supreme Court of the United States in Williams v. Pennsylvania, 579 U.S. 1 (2016).
- League of Women Voters of Pennsylvania v. Commonwealth (2018), in which the Court held that the 2011 congressional map by the state's legislature constituted an illegal, partisan gerrymander and consequently ordered the congressional map to be redrawn.
- Office of Disciplinary Counsel v. Kane (2019), where the Court held that the requirement for the Pennsylvania Attorney General to be a licensed attorney does not remove an incumbent Attorney General from office when their bar license is suspended.
- Commonwealth v. Davis (2019), in which the Court held that the Fifth Amendment to the Constitution of the United States of America protects individuals from forcibly relinquishing the passwords of their digital accounts to law enforcement.
- Commonwealth v. Alexander, 243 A.3d 177 (2020), in which the Court held that the federal automobile exception to the Fourth Amendment is incompatible with the Pennsylvania Constitution. Warrantless searches of motor vehicles require both probable cause and exigent circumstances.
- Commonwealth v. Cosby (2021), in which the Court held that the sexual assault charges as well as the relevant convictions and sentences against disgraced celebrity Bill Cosby over his rape of Andrea Constand must be vacated, he must be discharged from prison, and any future litigation over such crime must be barred due to violations of his due process rights.
- Commonwealth v. Barr II (2021), in which the Court held that warrantless searches are unjustified if they are predicated upon the odor of cannabis alone.
- Always Busy Consulting, LLC v. Babford & Co. (2021), in which the Court held that the Superior Court's quashing of an appeal had "improperly elevated form over substance."
- Commonwealth v. Berry, 323 A.3d 641 (2024), in which the Court held that "mere arrests and indictments, without convictions . . . have no value as probative matter."
- Commonwealth v. Williams, 331 A.3d 556 (2025) (not to be confused with Commonwealth v. Williams (2014)). "In this case the commonwealth charged a police detective with multiple criminal offenses related to his alleged abuse of his position. Specifically, the commonwealth alleged the detective assisted his cousin in stalking a woman and subsequently attempted to coverup his misconduct. But the lower courts — including the preliminary hearing court, the court of common pleas, a three-judge panel of the Superior Court, and the Superior Court en banc — concluded the commonwealth failed to produce prima facie evidence to support any of the charges against the detective and so dismissed the case. We granted allowance of appeal to consider whether this legal conclusion, which was grounded in part on the lower courts' interpretation of the relevant criminal statutes, was correct. We hold it was not. Accordingly, we reverse the order of the Superior Court and remand for further proceedings."
- Sitler v. Jones, 334 A.3d 861 (2025), in which the Court held that "an irrebuttable presumption of paternity rests on outdated assumptions".

== See also ==
- State supreme court
- King's Bench jurisdiction
- Superior Court of Pennsylvania
- Commonwealth Court of Pennsylvania
- List of state and county courthouses in Pennsylvania
- Marbury v. Madison
- Andrea Constand v. William H. Cosby, Jr.
