= Defender Association of Philadelphia =

Non-profit corporation in Pennsylvania

- Headquarters: Philadelphia, Pennsylvania
- No. of offices: 1
- Major practice areas: Adult and juvenile state and civil court hearings, criminal mental health hearings, and child advocates for dependent and neglected children
- Key people: Paul J. Hetznecker, Esq., President; Catherine M. Recker, Esq., Vice President
- Date founded: 1934
- Company type: Nonprofit corporation
- Website: phillydefenders.org

Defender Association of Philadelphia, founded in 1936, is a non-profit corporation, based in Philadelphia, Pennsylvania, that provides defense on a court-appointed basis for criminal and delinquency cases in which the defendants and respondents are indigent adults and juveniles.

It operates as a 501(c)(3) Public Charity. In 2023, it claimed $83,916,027 in revenue and $56,503,891 in total assets.

== History ==
In 1990, the association appointed the first woman as chief in 56 years. She retired in 2014.

In October 2001, the firm moved Comcast Center (Philadelphia) at 17th Street and John F. Kennedy Boulevard. In 2015, Keir Bradford-Grey become head of the Association.

== Notable people ==
- C. Darnell Jones II, federal judge
- Joseline Peña-Melnyk, politician
- Abbe Smith, law professor
- Gregory M. Sleet, federal judge
- Luis Felipe Restrepo, federal judge
- Benjamin H. Read, politician

== Scholarship ==
- |Client Service in a Defender Organization: The Philadelphia Experience
- |egal Aid to Indigent Criminal Defendants in Philadelphia and New Jersey
