= First Judicial District of Pennsylvania =

The First Judicial District is the judicial body governing the county of Philadelphia, Pennsylvania, United States. It consists of the Court of Common Pleas of Philadelphia County and the Philadelphia Municipal Court.

Although the title of the district is assigned by the Pennsylvania Unified Court System, the court operates under the county of Philadelphia. All judges serving on the bench are elected to serve their terms by registered voters in Philadelphia, rather than appointed by the executive branch of government. The First Judicial District's respective courts preside over all state and local jurisdiction civil and criminal matters that occur within the county of Philadelphia's borders.

== Court of Common Pleas ==
The Court of Common Pleas is led by a President Judge and Administrative Judges. Common Pleas is further broken down into three divisions: trial, family and orphans' court division.

As of November 2023, the President Judge of the Court of Common Pleas is the Honorable Nina Wright-Padilla, and as of January 16, 2024, the current Administrative Judge is the Honorable Daniel J. Anders, having previously served as the civil division's supervising judge. As of January 23, 2024, there are 29 judges, including senior judges, sitting in the Civil Trial Division. As of July 6, 2021, there were 39 judges in the Criminal Trial Division. The civil and criminal sections each have their own supervising judges, including a separate supervising judge for the civil division's Commerce Case Management Program. As of January 16, 2024, the Commerce Program's Supervising Judge is the Honorable Abbe F. Fletman, and the Criminal Division Supervising Judge is the Honorable Rose Marie Defino-Nastasi as of June 14, 2023.

The family division is broken down into the Juvenile Branch and Domestic Relations, and has 25 assigned judges. The Family Division has its own Administrative Judge and Supervising Judge (being the Honorable Margaret T. Murphy and the Honorable Walter J. Olszewksi as of May 2024). As of May 2024, there are four judges assigned to the Orphan's Court Division, including its own Administrative Judge (Hon. Sheila Woods-Skipper as of May 2024).

The trial division holds all criminal proceedings, as well as proceedings for civil matters where more than $10,000 is being challenged. The family division is discharged with resolving domestic relations and juvenile cases. The orphans' court is responsible for processing and resolving disputes of trusts, wills, and estates. The Adult probation and parole services for Philadelphia are under the jurisdiction of the Common Pleas court. The Intake and Interstate Units are located in the Basement of the Criminal Justice Center, while all other units are located at 714 Market Street.

Criminal dockets would be CP-51-CR-*****-2007. CP denotes the court, in this case, Common Pleas. 51 is the county code, in this case Philadelphia County. CR denotes the type of case, criminal. The * represents the case number and the last four digits are the year the case was created.

== Court of Common Pleas Commerce Case Management Program ("Commerce Court") ==
Through a 1999 Order of then Administrative Judge John W. Herron, the Commerce Case Management Program was created within the trial division's civil section, effective January 1, 2000. The program is generally known as the Commerce Court. It is a specialized business court primarily hearing only business and commercial cases that fall within specifically defined categories. Judge Albert W. Sheppard, Jr. served along with Judge Herron as the first two Commerce Court judges. There are now three assigned civil section judges who exclusively hear Commerce Court cases, one of whom serves as the Commerce Court's Supervising Judge (the Honorable Abbe F. Fletman as of May 2024). The position of Commerce Court Supervising Judge was formalized in that program's second decade, and has been held by Judges Patricia A. McInerney, Gary S. Glazer, and Nina Wright Padilla, prior to Judge Fletman. Among other judges who have served in the Commerce Court are Judges Howland W. Abramson, Mark I. Bernstein, Gene D. Cohen, James C. Crumlish, III, Pamela Pryor Dembe, Vincent J. DiNubile, Jr., Remy I. Djerassi, C. Darnell Jones, II, Arnold L. New, Paula A. Patrick, Albert John Snite, Jr., and Leon W. Tucker.

The Commerce Court provides "Advice to Counsel" and Supervising Judge Fletman has posted her Courtroom Procedures. The Commerce Court has three case tracks: (1) Expedited (trial in 13 months); (2) Standard (trial in 18 months); and Complex (trial in 24 months).

Effective January 1, 2026, in addition to the rules, practices and procedures set out in the Pennsylvania Rules of Civil Procedure, by administrative order parties with a case in the Commerce Court are required to disclose certain information and produce certain types of documents to opposing parties early in a case, without any formal discovery demand from an opposing party. That same administrative order provides for the parties and the court to take other affirmative steps in the pre trial management of a case not otherwise found in Pennsylvania's Rules of Civil Procedure.

Since the Commerce Court's inception, its design has required that opposing counsel, and often the litigants themselves, participate in mandatory settlement conferences facilitated by Judges Pro Tempore (JPTs). These JPTs are not judges, but seasoned commercial and business lawyers with training or experience as mediators and neutrals. JPTs are designated by the Commerce Program Supervising Judge. The JPT pool consists of volunteers "nominated by the Philadelphia Bar Association Business Law Section, Business Litigation Committee ("Committee") and/or the Court, and recommended by the Committee." To qualify as a JPT, one must be a licensed attorney, "with no less than fifteen (15) years of experience in litigation or alternate dispute resolution (ADR), including a practice focused on the types of disputes" over which the Commerce Court has jurisdiction. JPTs must also have at least 10 hours of ADR training "or shall have participated as a neutral, JPT, or mediator in a minimum of 3 ADR proceedings, including but not limited to mediations, settlement conferences and private arbitrations, involving" actions of a nature falling in the Commerce Courts jurisdiction.

In 2005, the Committee of Seventy produced a study on the Commerce Court. The Philadelphia Bar Association, and the Business Litigation Committee within its Business Law Section, have been involved with the creation and development of the Commerce Court since before its inception.

The Commerce Court has also posted over 1,000 judicial opinions on its website since 2000. In providing guidance to litigants and their lawyers, the Commerce Court makes these opinions searchable by topic as well.

== Municipal Court ==
All criminal cases in Philadelphia initially go through Philadelphia Municipal Court, with 27 judges. The Municipal Court maintains jurisdiction over criminal cases where the maximum punishment possible for an offender is less than five years imprisonment. The Municipal Court's traffic division handles all traffic court matters arising within City limits. The Municipal Court also has jurisdiction over civil cases with an amount in controversy less than $12,000 (or $12,500 for fines and most debts owed to the City of Philadelphia, or $15,000 for delinquent real-estate taxes owed to the City and certain tax debts owed to the School District of Philadelphia). The civil division of the Municipal Court also has jurisdiction over all landlord-tenant disputes, residential or commercial, irrespective of the amount in controversy.

Appeals from the Municipal Court remain within the First Judicial District by becoming a matter of the Court of Common Pleas. Philadelphia is one of two counties in Pennsylvania that has a Municipal Court (the other being Pittsburgh). Criminal dockets would be MC-51-CR-*****-2007.

Summary offenses are heard in Community Court, the usual punishment from a summary offense is a small fine and/or community service. The summary dockets would be MC-51-SU-*****-2007.

== See also ==
- Criminal Justice Center (Philadelphia)
