= List of first women lawyers and judges in Florida =

This is a list of the first women lawyer(s) and judge(s) in Florida. It includes the year in which the women were admitted to practice law (in parentheses). Also included are women who achieved other distinctions such becoming the first in their state to graduate from law school or become a political figure.

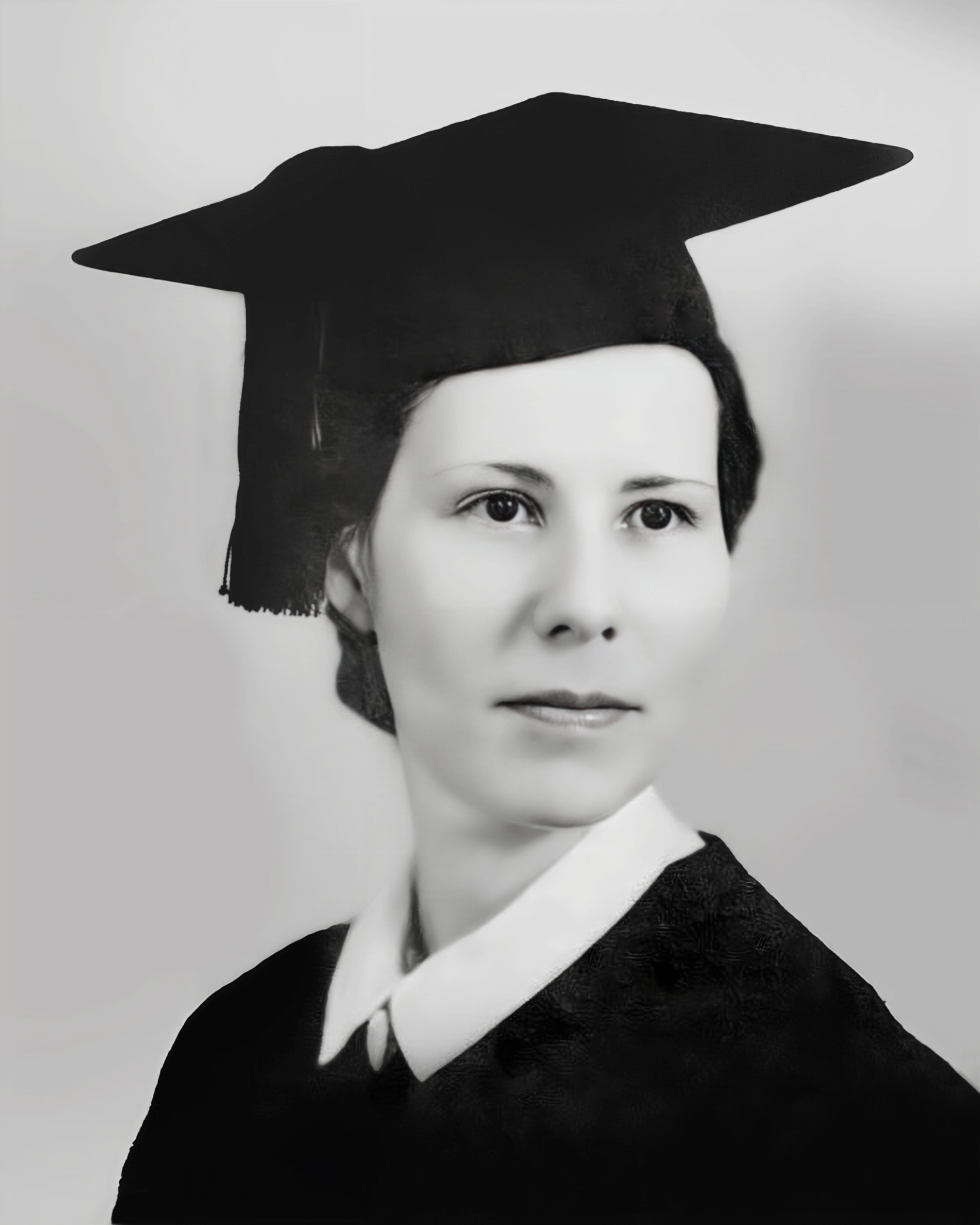
Elva Victoria Diaz (Thomas): First female of Spanish descent to practice law in Florida (1933). She graduated from: Hillsborough High School (Tampa, 1926), Florida State College for Women (Tallahassee,1931), and Stetson Law School (Deland, May 1933). She took and passed the State Board Law Exam in June of 1933 and worked for Shackleford, Farrior, Stallings & Evans in Downtown Tampa.

== Firsts in Florida's history ==
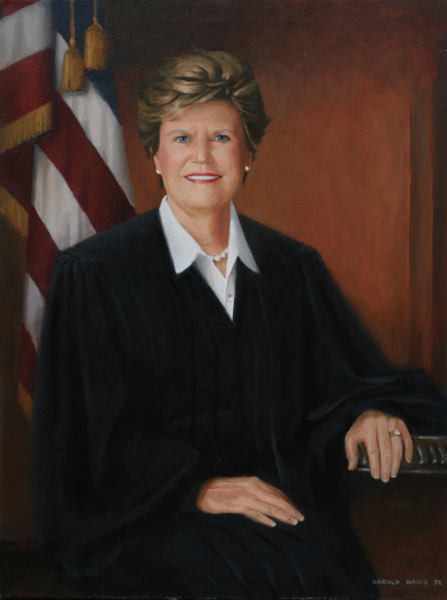
Susan H. Black: First female county (1973), circuit (1975) and federal court (1979) judge in Florida

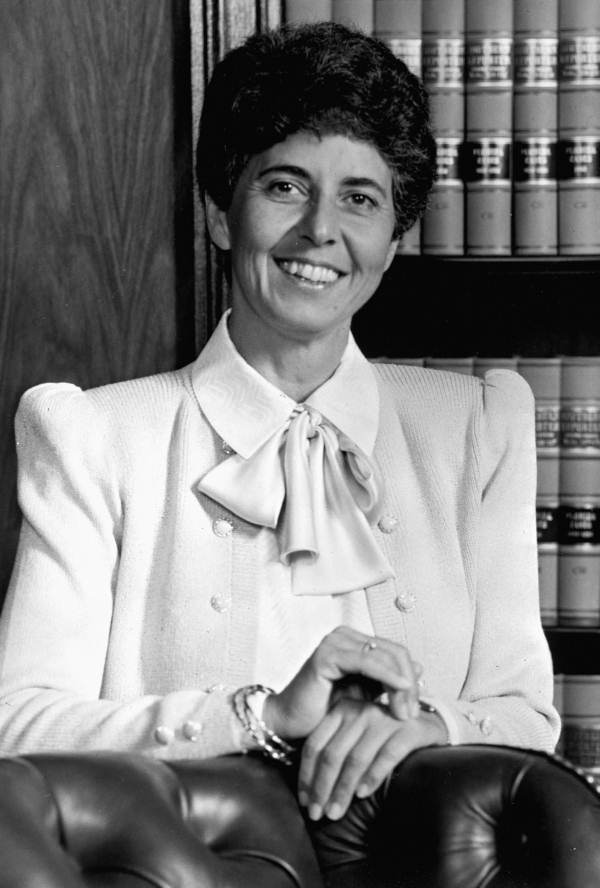
Rosemary Barkett: First female Justice (1985) and Chief Justice (1992) of the Florida Supreme Court

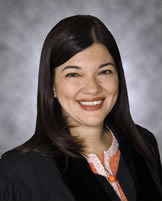
Barbara Lagoa: First Hispanic American female Justice of the Florida Supreme Court (2019)

=== Law School ===
- First female law graduate: Mary Stewart Howarth-Hewitt (c. 1908)

=== Lawyers ===
- First female: Louise R. Pinnell (1898)
- First Spanish American female: Elva Victoria Diaz (1933)
- First African American female: Bernice Gaines (1958)
- First deaf (female) admitted to Florida State Bar: Karen Jones (1984)
- First Bangladeshi American (female): Zubaida Iqbal (2014)
- First Dominican (female) authorized to practice Dominican law in Florida: Francia Liriano (2015)
- First female openly autistic: Haley Moss (2019)

=== State judges ===
- First female (county court): Bessie Bellinger in 1922 (to complete her late husband's term)
- First female (judge): Edith Atkinson in 1924
- First female (serve temporarily on the Florida District Court of Appeal and Florida Supreme Court) Rhea Grossman in 1971 and 1972 respectively
- First female (county court and circuit court): Susan H. Black in 1973 and 1975 respectively
- First female (appellate court): Anne C. Booth in 1978
- First female (business court): Renee Roche in 2004
- First Hispanic American female (of Cuban descent): Margarita Esquiroz (1974) in 1979
- First Hispanic American female (circuit court): Maria Korvick in 1981
- First African American female: Leah Simms (1974) in 1981
- First (Arab American and Hispanic American) female (Florida Supreme Court): Rosemary Barkett (1970) in 1985
- First female (Fourth District Court of Appeal): Bobby W. Gunther in 1986
- First African American female (circuit court): Melvia Green in 1989
- First (Arab American and Hispanic American) female (Florida Supreme Court; Chief Justice): Rosemary Barkett (1970) in 1992
- First African American female (Second District Court of Appeal): Peggy Quince (1975) in 1993
- First openly lesbian female: Victoria Sigler in 1994
- First Jewish American female (Florida Supreme Court): Barbara Pariente in 1997
- First African American female (Fourth District Court of Appeal): Carole Y. Taylor (1974) in 1998
- First African American female (Florida Supreme Court): Peggy Quince (1975) in 1998
- First African American female (Thirteenth Judicial Circuit): Marva L. Crenshaw in 2000
- First openly lesbian female (circuit court): Victoria Sigler in 2000
- First African American female (Fifth Circuit Court): Sandra Edwards-Stephens in 2000
- First Cuban American female (Second District Court of Appeal): Virginia M. Hernandez Covington (1980) in 2001
- First African American (female) (First Judicial Circuit): Joyce H. Williams in 2005
- First Colombian American (female): Catalina M. Avalos in 2005
- First Hispanic American (Cuban American) female (Third District Court of Appeals): Barbara Lagoa (1992) in 2006
- First Ethiopian American (female): Nina Ashenafi-Richardson in 2008
- First African American female (Florida Supreme Court; Chief Justice): Peggy Quince (1975) in 2008
- First African American female (First District Court of Appeals): Nikki Clark in 2009
- First Colombian American (female) elected: Diana Gonzalez-Whyte in 2012
- First African American female (Second Judicial Circuit Court): Barbara Hobbs in 2012
- First Asian American [female] (Ninth Judicial Circuit Court of Florida): Jeanette Dejuras Bigney in 2012
- First Cuban American female (Chief Circuit Judge; Eleventh Judicial Circuit): Bertila Soto (1986) in 2013
- First Dominican (female): Gisela Laurent in 2016 (upon her appointment to the Ninth Circuit Court)
- First (Hispanic American) female (Twelfth Judicial Circuit): Maria Ruhl in 2019
- First Hispanic American (Cuban American) female (Florida Supreme Court): Barbara Lagoa (1992) in 2019
- First female (Chief Judge; Twelfth Judicial Circuit): Kimberly C. Bonner in 2019
- First Caribbean American (female) (justice-designate of the Florida Supreme Court until appointment was nullified): Renatha Francis in 2020
- First Haitian American (female) (Eleventh Circuit Court): Lody Jean in 2020
- First African American female (Seventh Judicial Circuit Court of Florida): Alicia Washington in 2020
- First Colombian American (female) (Ninth Judicial Circuit Court of Florida): Tarlika Nunez-Navarro in 2021
- First Filipino American (female): Melissa Cordon Black in 2022

=== Federal judges ===
- First female: Susan H. Black in 1979
- First African American female: Mary Scriven
- First African American (female) (Administrative Law Judge): Eleanor Hunter
- First female (United States District Court for the Southern District of Florida): Lenore Carrero Nesbitt (1960) in 1983
- First Cuban American female (United States District Court for the Southern District of Florida): Cecilia Altonaga (1983) in 2003
- First African American female (United States District Court for the Southern District of Florida): Marcia G. Cooke in 2004
- First Hispanic American (female) (U.S. Bankruptcy Court - Southern District of Florida): Corali Lopez-Castro in 2023

=== Attorney General of Florida ===
- First female: Pam Bondi (1990) in 2010

=== Assistant Attorney General of Florida ===
- First female: Rebecca Bowles Hawkins (1935) in 1948

=== United States Attorney ===
- First female (Middle District of Florida): Donna Bucella
- First Hispanic American female (Middle District of Florida): Maria Chapa Lopez in 2018
- First female (Southern District of Florida): Ariana Fajardo Orshan in 2018

=== State Attorney ===
- First female: Janet Reno (1963) in 1978
- First Cuban American (female): Katherine Fernandez Rundle in 1994
- First African American (female): Aramis Ayala in 2016

=== Assistant State Attorney ===
- First female: Susan H. Black in 1969

=== County Attorney ===
- First female: Annie Joe Law in 1928

=== Public Defender ===
- First female: Barbara Linthicum (1989-1990)

=== Florida Bar Association ===
- First female president: Patricia A. Seitz from 1993-1994
- First African American female president-elect designate: Rosalyn Sia Baker-Barnes in 2024

== Firsts in local history ==
- Stacy A. Scott: First female Public Defender of the Eighth Judicial Circuit (2010) [Alachua, Baker, Bradford, Gilchrist, Levy and Union Counties, Florida]
- Susan C. Bucklew: First female appointed as a Judge of the Hillsborough County Superior Court (1982) and circuit court judge for the Thirteenth Judicial Circuit, Florida (1986)
- Alexcia Cox: First African American female to serve as the Attorney General of the 15th Judicial Circuit, Florida (2025)
- Lorelie P. Brannan: First female county court judge in Baker County, Florida (2022)
- Frances Ann Jamieson (1960): First female lawyer in Brevard County, Florida
- Cathleen B. Clarke: First African American (female) judge in Brevard County, Florida (1998)
- Angeline Weir (1960): First female County Solicitor in Broward County, Florida. She was also the first female President of the Broward County Bar Association (1983-1984).
- Mildred S. Akerman (1956): First female elected judge in Broward County, Florida (1959)
- Elizabeth Athanasakos (1957): First female municipal judge in Broward County, Florida (1964–1974)
- Barbara Bridge (1964): First female judge of the County Court in Broward County, Florida (1972)
- Mary Rudd-Robinson: First African American female judge in Broward County, Florida (1993)
- Florence Taylor Barner: First Haitian American (female) judge in Broward County, Florida
- Natasha DePrimo: First Asian American female judge in Broward County, Florida (2019)
- Alison Smith: First Black female to serve as the President of the Broward County Bar Association (2021)
- Cynthia Everett: First female (and African American) to serve as the City Attorney for Fort Lauderdale, Florida [Broward County, Florida]
- Pauline Drake: First African American female to serve on the Fourth Judicial Circuit Court (1998) [Clay, Duval and Nassau Counties, Florida]
- Kristina Mobley: First female county judge in Clay County, Florida (c. 2015)
- Patricia "Trish" Thomas: First female judge in Citrus County and the 5th Judicial Circuit,(1993; which includes Citrus, Sumter, Hernando, Lake and Marion Counties, Florida)
- Hixon Holley: First female judge in Collier County, Florida
- Maria Ruhl: First Hispanic American female (and Hispanic American in general) appointed as a Judge of the Twelfth Judicial Circuit of Florida (2019) [DeSoto, Manatee, and Sarasota Counties, Florida]
- Susan H. Black: First female to serve on the Duval County Court in Florida (1973-1975)
- Rhonda Peoples-Waters: First African American (female) judge in Duval County, Florida (2021)
- Pauline M. Drake: First African American female to serve as a County Judge in Jacksonville, Duval County, Florida
- Bessie Bellinger: First female to act in a judicial position in Escambia County, Florida (1922)
- Kathy Garner: First female (and African American) judge in Gadsden County, Florida (2009)
- Sheree H. Lancaster: First female judge in Gilchrist County, Florida
- Annie Joe Law: First female to serve as the County Attorney in Hernando County, Florida (1928)
- Heidi Davis: First female judge in Hernando County, Florida (2010). She is also the first female circuit court judge for Lake County, Florida.
- Linda J. Treiman (1976): First female lawyer in Brooksville, Florida [Hernando County, Florida]
- Mae Wood (c. 1896): First female lawyer in Hillsborough County, Florida
- Carolyn House Stewart: First African American female to serve as the Assistant State Attorney of the Thirteenth Judicial Circuit (1980) [Hillsborough County, Florida]
- Arthenia Joyner (1969): First African American female lawyer in Hillsborough County, Florida
- Josephine Howard Stafford: First female to serve on the Municipal Court of Tampa, Florida (1958) [Hillsborough County, Florida]
- Vivian Corvo: First Hispanic American female circuit judge in Hillsborough County, Florida
- Marva Crenshaw: First African American female circuit judge in Hillsborough County, Florida
- Julianne Holt: First female Public Defender of the Thirteenth Judicial Circuit [Hillsborough County, Florida]
- Catherine McEwen: First female appointed as a U.S. bankruptcy judge in Tampa, Florida [Hillsborough County, Florida]
- Marsha Rydberg: First female to serve as the President of the Hillsborough County Bar Association
- Susan Johnson Velez: First African American female to serve as the President of Hillsborough County Bar Association (2013-2014)
- Gwynne Young: First female to serve as the Assistant State Attorney in Hillsborough County, Florida
- Nicole Menz: First female judge in Indian River County, Florida (2018)
- Judith Hawkins: First African American (female) judge in Leon County, Florida
- Cassandra Jackson: First African American female to serve as the City Attorney for Tallahassee, Florida [Leon County, Florida]
- Barbara Linthicum and Nancy Daniels: First female Public Defenders respectively for Leon County, Florida
- Edith Atkinson: First female judge in Dade County, Florida (1924)
- Gwen Cherry (1965): First African American female lawyer in Dade County, Florida
- Mattie Belle Davis: First female to serve on the Metropolitan Court of Dade County (1959), Florida
- Janet Reno (1963): First female to serve as a State's Attorney in Miami-Dade County, Florida (1978)
- Kathy Fernandez Rundle: First Cuban American (female) to serve as a State Attorney in Miami-Dade County, Florida (1993)
- Dixie L. Herlong Chastain: First female appointed as a judge of the Juvenile and Domestic Relations Court in Dade County, Florida. She was also the sixth female judge in Florida.
- Gill S. Freeman: First (female) judge assigned to Miami's then-newly established business court (2007)
- Bertila Soto: First Hispanic American/Cuban American (female) to serve as the Chief Judge of the Eleventh Judicial Circuit in Miami-Dade County, Florida (2013)
- Abigail Price Williams (1985): First female to serve as the County Attorney for Miami-Dade County, Florida (2015)
- Lody Jean: First Haitian American (female) to serve on the Miami-Dade County Court (2020)
- Suzanne Bass: First female judge in Nassau County, Florida
- Mary Sandefur Schulman (1943): First female lawyer in Okeechobee County, Florida
- Aramis Ayala: First African American (female) to serve as the State's Attorney of Orange County, Florida (2019)
- LaShawnda K. Jackson: First Black (female) President of the Orange County Bar Association (2021)
- Gabrielle Sanders: First African American female (and African American in general) judge in Osceola County, Florida (2019)
- Anne E'del Deacon: First female municipal judge in Palm Beach, Florida and fifth female judge in Florida [Palm Beach County, Florida]
- Catherine Brunson: First African American female lawyer to work for the Palm Beach County Attorney’s Office (1977), set up a law practice (1984), and to serve on the Circuit Court in Palm Beach County (1994)
- Nancy Perez: First Hispanic American (female) judge in Palm Beach County, Florida (1991)
- Sheree Davis Cunningham: First African American female judge in Palm Beach County, Florida
- Rosalyn Sia Baker-Barnes: First African American female to serve as President of the Palm County Bar Association, Florida (2017)
- Meenu Sasser: First Asian American (female) judge in Palm Beach County, Florida
- Danielle Sherriff: First Haitian American (female) judge in Palm Beach County, Florida (2023)
- Debra Roberts: First African American (female) judge in Pasco County, Florida (2002)
- Elizabeth Martin Leeman: First female lawyer to join the faculty of Stetson University School of Law (1970) [Pinellas County, Florida]
- Luz Nagle: First tenured Hispanic American (female) law professor at Stetson University College of Law (2004) [Pinellas County, Florida]
- C. Bette Wimbish (1968): First African American female lawyer in Pinellas County, Florida
- Catherine Harlan: First female county judge in Pinellas County, Florida
- Miriam Irizarry: First Hispanic American female county court judge in Pinellas County, Florida
- Elizabeth Kovachevich: First female elected as a circuit judge in Pinellas County, Florida
- Michèle Alexandre: First African American (female) to serve as the Dean of Stetson University College of Law (2019)
- Arthenia Joyner: First African American (female) lawyer in Polk County, Florida
- Karla Foreman Wright: First African American female judge in Polk County, Florida (2000)
- Mada Fraser Babcock McLendon: First female municipal judge in Lake Wales, Florida and third female judge in Florida [Polk County, Florida]
- Mary Kennerly Buckles: First female judge in Putnam County, Florida and second female judge in Florida
- Alicia Washington: First African American (female) judge to serve in Putnam County, Florida (2020)
- Valeria Thomas: First African American (female) to serve as Palatka City Attorney, Putnam County, Florida (2021)
- Donna Goerner: First African American female judge in Seminole County, Florida (2020)
- Peggy Elizabeth Ready: First female judge in St. Johns County, Florida as well as the county's first female assistant public defender
- Joan Anthony: First African American female to preside over a family court in St. Johns County, Florida (2021)
- Elsie O'Laughlin (1948): First female lawyer and judge in St. Lucie County, Florida
- Pamela Fort: First African American female lawyer in Fort Pierce, Florida [St. Lucie County, Florida]
- Renee Roche: First female Business Court judge appointed in the Ninth Judicial Circuit in Orlando, Florida (2004)
- Alicia L. Latimore: First African-American woman to serve in the Ninth Judicial Circuit as a judge in Orange County, Florida (2006)
- Gill S. Freeman: First female Complex Business Litigation Division judge appointed in the Eleventh Judicial Circuit in Miami-Dade, Florida (2006)
- Lisa S. Walsh: First female International Commercial Arbitration Court judge appointed in the Eleventh Judicial Circuit in Miami-Dade, Florida (2017)
- Charise A. Morgan: First Black female to serve as the President of the Miami-Dade County Bar Association (2024)

== See also ==
- List of first women lawyers and judges in the United States
- Timeline of women lawyers in the United States
- Women in law

== Other topics of interest ==
- List of first minority male lawyers and judges in the United States
- List of first minority male lawyers and judges in Florida
