= Florida State Courts System =

The Florida State Courts System is the unified state court system of Florida.

== Courts ==
The Florida State Courts System consists of:

- The Florida State Supreme Court;
- Six District Courts of Appeal, which are the state's intermediate appellate courts;
- 20 circuit courts, which handle civil cases involving more than $50,000 and criminal felony cases; and
- 67 county courts (one for each of Florida's 67 counties), which handle civil cases involving $50,000 or less and criminal misdemeanor cases.

=== Supreme Court ===
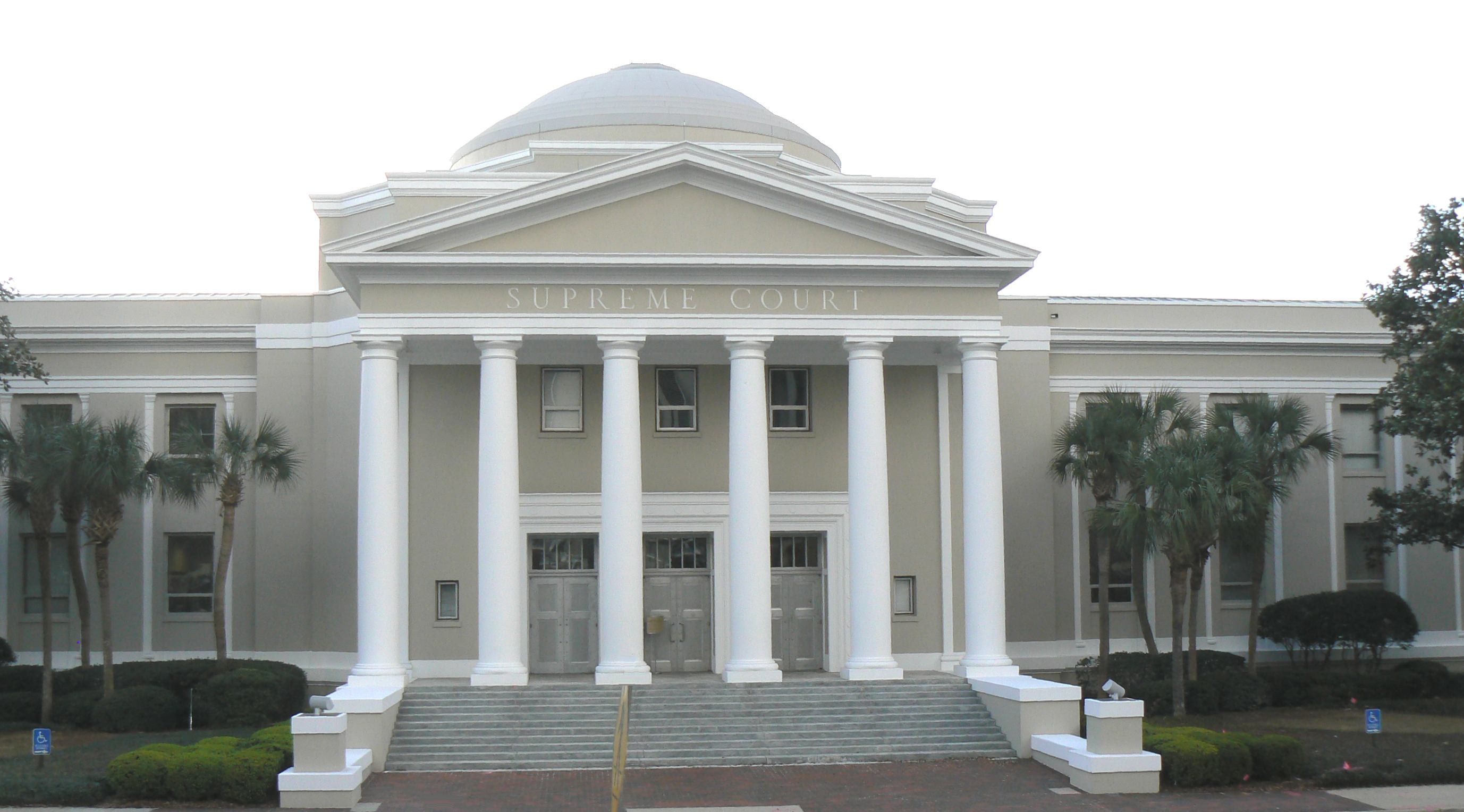
The Florida Supreme Court building.

The Supreme Court of Florida is the highest court in the U.S. state of Florida. The Supreme Court consists of seven judges: the chief justice and six justices who are appointed by the governor of Florida to 6-year terms and remain in office if retained in a general election near the end of each term. The Court is the final arbiter of Florida law, and its decisions are binding authority for all other Florida state courts.

Established upon statehood in 1845, the court is headquartered across the street from the Florida State Capitol in Tallahassee. Throughout the court's history, it has undergone reorganizations as Florida's population has steadily grown. The Florida Supreme Court has heard many cases of note, including the 2000 presidential election Florida recount case Bush v. Gore and the Terri Schiavo case.

Map of the Florida's appellate districts

=== District courts of appeal ===
The six district courts of appeal are the intermediate appellate courts. They consist of the:

- First District Court of Appeal (headquartered in Tallahassee);
- Second District Court of Appeal (headquartered in Tampa);
- Third District Court of Appeal (headquartered in Miami);
- Fourth District Court of Appeal (headquartered in West Palm Beach);
- Fifth District Court of Appeal (headquartered in Daytona Beach); and
- Sixth District Court of Appeal (headquartered in Lakeland).

Map of Florida's circuit courts

=== Circuit courts ===
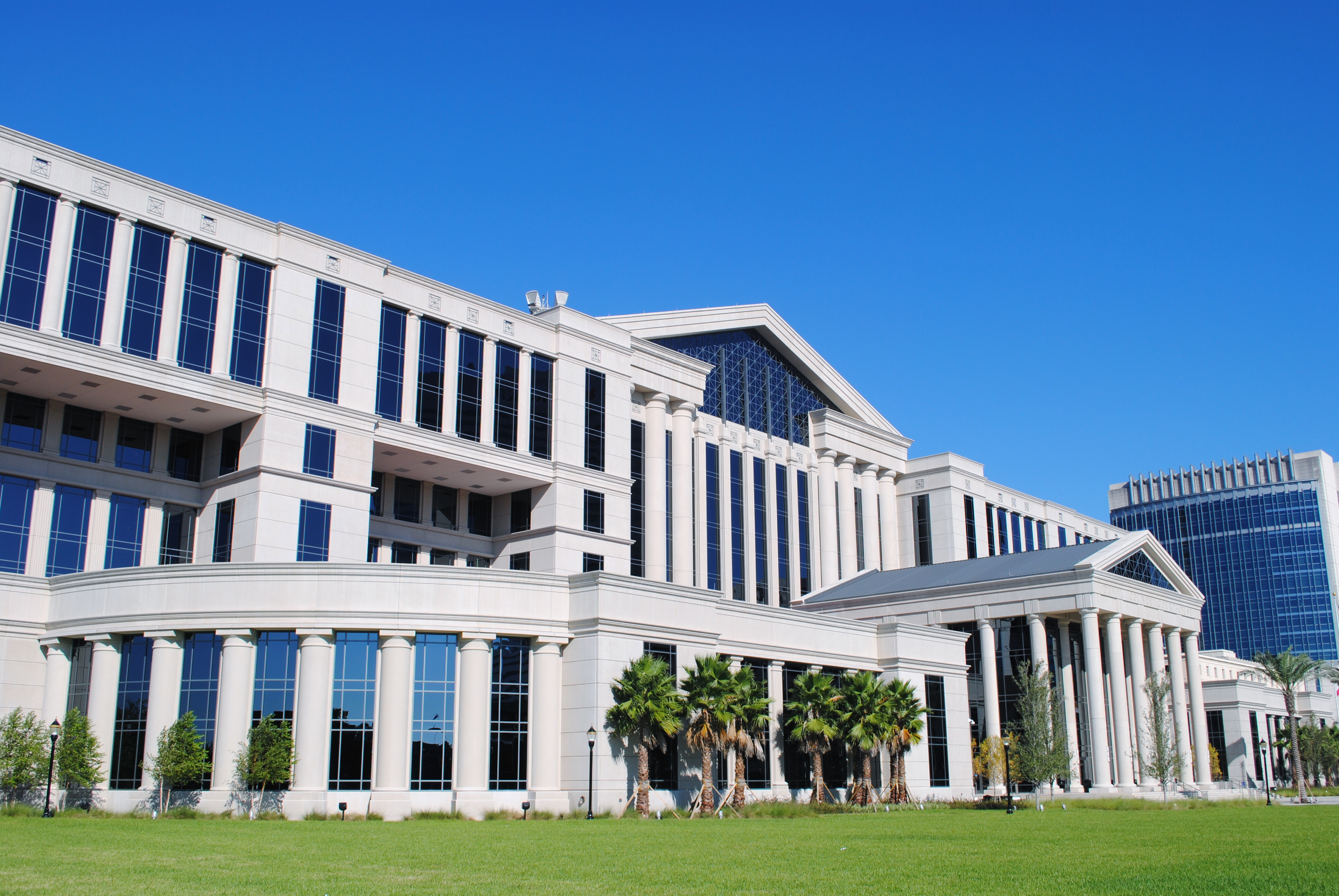
The Duval County Courthouse housing the Duval County and Fourth Judicial Circuit Courts.

The 20 circuit courts are state courts, and are trial courts of original jurisdiction for most controversies.

The circuit courts primarily handle felony criminal cases, civil cases where the amount in controversy is greater than $30,000, as well as appeals from county courts. Circuit courts also have jurisdiction over domestic relations, juvenile dependency, juvenile delinquency, and probate matters.

Florida has twenty judicial circuits. Miami-Dade, Broward, Monroe, Palm Beach and Hillsborough are the only counties which are coterminous with their respective judicial circuits. In the rest of the state, a single judicial circuit encompasses multiple counties within its jurisdiction.

Four circuit courts have created business court programs: the Ninth Judicial Circuit (Orange and Osceola Counties), the Eleventh Judicial Circuit (Miami-Dade County), the Thirteenth Judicial Circuit (Hillsborough County), and the Seventeenth Judicial Circuit (Broward County). In 2004, Ninth Circuit chief judge Belvin Perry made Judge Renee Roche Florida's first specialized business court judge. Judge Roche, along with Florida judge John E. Jordan (Ninth Judicial Circuit), have served as Business Court representatives to the American Bar Association's Business Law Section.

Judge Gill Freeman was the first judge presiding over Miami's Complex Business Litigation Section, serving in that role for five years. She is co-chair of the Florida Bar's Business Law Section Business Courts Task Force, which was formed in 2018 to study the merits of implementing a statewide business court. In early 2020, on the precipice of the COVID pandemic, the task force recommended a proposed statewide business court.

In 2008, Seventeenth Judicial Circuit (Broward County) chief judge Victor Tobin issued an administrative order creating a Complex Litigation Unit with subdivisions for complex tort cases and complex business court cases. Judge Robert Rosenberg, who had suggested the idea of a specialized business court in the Seventeenth Circuit was appointed as one of the initial complex business case judges, with Judge Charles Greene to handle complex tort cases and Judge Jeffrey Streitfeld to handle complex tort and business cases.

In 2017, the Eleventh Judicial Circuit Court in Miami-Dade County Florida created a separate International Commercial Arbitration Court. Judge Lisa M. Walsh serves as both a Complex Business Litigation Division Judge and a presiding International Commercial Arbitration Court judge. Judge Jennifer D. Bailey similarly served in both positions.

=== County courts ===
The county courts have original jurisdiction over misdemeanor criminal cases, including violations of county and municipal ordinances, and in civil cases whose value in controversy does not exceed $30,000.

== Administration ==
The chief justice of the Florida Supreme Court serves as the chief administrative officer of the entire branch. The Office of the State Courts Administrator, largely housed in the Supreme Court Building in Tallahassee, assists the chief justice in administering the courts.

Chief judges of the District Courts of Appeals and of the circuit courts retain substantial authority over the day-to-day operation of their courts. The chief judges of the 20 circuit courts also supervise the judges of the county courts within their jurisdictions.

The Florida Bar is the integrated bar association whose duties include the regulation and discipline of attorneys. The Florida Board of Bar Examiners, a separate entity, administers the moral character screening and background investigation of Bar applicants along with the Multistate Professional Responsibility Examination and bar exam.

The Florida Courts eFiling Portal provides electronic court filing (e-filing) and recording capabilities statewide. Supreme Court opinions are published in the Florida Cases reporter (a Florida-specific version of the Southern Reporter). The Southern Reporter contains opinions of the court since 1887, and the Florida Reports published opinions of the court from 1846–1948.

The Florida State Courts operate under a statewide communications plan administered through the Public Information Office of the Florida Supreme Court and implemented by the statewide professional association of Florida Court Public Information Officers, Inc.

=== Florida Judicial College ===
All new judges are required to complete this curriculum during their first year of service after selection to the bench. The program is taught by the state’s most experienced appellate and trial court judges. Curriculum includes:

- January – Comprehensive orientation, in-depth trial skills workshop, a mock trial experience and other classes.
- March – Intensive, substantive law courses with education for those who are switching divisions and/or new trial judges.
- There is a separate program for new appellate judges.
- A mentor is available for new trial court judges to provide one-on-one guidance from an experienced judge.

== Law ==
The right to a single appeal to one of the district courts of appeal is guaranteed in most circumstances. Further appeals to the Florida Supreme Court are available as matter of right only in limited circumstances (in capital punishment cases, appeal is automatic to the Supreme Court, bypassing the district court of appeal). If an appeal to the Supreme Court is not available as a matter of right, a party can still petition for discretionary review, though only a fraction of these petitions are granted. Supreme Court decisions and case law are binding upon all Florida courts. The decisions and case law precedent of each district court of appeal are binding upon all circuit and county courts within that district's jurisdiction. Case law and decisions from another district court of appeal are persuasive and often cited within the courts of other appellate districts, but are not binding precedent in those other districts unless no other Florida appellate court has addressed the issue in question.

In the event of conflict between the precedent of different district courts of appeal, county and circuit courts must adhere to the case law of their own district, but may certify conflict with another district court of appeal decision for purposes of asking the Supreme Court to resolve the conflict (the courts may also certify a "question of great importance" to the Supreme Court for purposes of obtaining that Court's decision on the matter). District courts of appeal may recede from certain case law and precedent in subsequent decisions, or the Supreme Court may overrule a district court's precedent in favor of conflicting case law from another district.

Florida's parole system was abolished for crimes committed after October 1, 1983. Judges are granted limited discretion in establishing sentencing. However, prisoners convicted of crimes prior to that date are still eligible for parole.

== Officers ==
=== Public defenders ===
As of January 1, 1997, Florida was the only US jurisdiction that denies legal representation for those unable to pay (public defenders) based upon one's inability to pay.

== History ==
The judiciary of Florida was unified by a 1973 constitutional amendment.

== See also ==
- Government of Florida
- Law enforcement in Florida
