= Jerome B. Abrams =

American judge

Judge, First Judicial District of Minnesota
- In office January 11, 2008 – February 2, 2022
- Appointed by: Governor Tim Pawlenty (2007), then elected in 2010 and 2016, and retired in 2022
- Succeeded by: Stacey Sorenson

Senior Judge, District Court of Minnesota
- In office March 7, 2022 – June 30, 2025

Personal details
- Born: La Crosse, Wisconsin
- Education: Beloit College (B.A. 1977); William Mitchell College of Law (J.D. 1981)

Jerome B. Abrams is an American judge who served as a district court judge in Minnesota for 14 years. He has been involved with studying and implementing changes to the civil litigation process in Minnesota and nationally. He has worked with the Minnesota Supreme Court's Civil Justice Reform Task Force on improvements to that state's civil litigation system; and the Conference of Chief Justices, the National Center for State Courts, and the Institute for the Advancement of the American Legal System on improving the civil litigation process in the United States.

== Judicial service ==
In 2007, Minnesota Governor Tim Pawlenty appointed Abrams as a judge to Minnesota's First Judicial District Court, effective January 11, 2008. This is a trial level court with jurisdiction over civil, criminal, family, juvenile, probate, and traffic cases. It encompasses Scott and Dakota Counties, among other Minnesota counties. In 2010, Abrams was elected to the First Judicial District and was reelected in 2016. He retired on February 2, 2022, and was succeeded by Stacey Sorenson. Abrams was appointed a senior judge statewide, for a term running from March 7, 2022, to June 30, 2025. Senior judges are "retired judges subject to recall" who can serve as judges, or as mediators or arbitrators when they are not actually serving as judges in a particular case.

=== Civil justice activity in Minnesota ===
Abrams was a member of the Minnesota Supreme Court's Civil Justice Reform Task Force, created in late 2010. The task force reviewed earlier Minnesota studies, and civil justice reforms in courts outside of Minnesota, to develop recommendations for improving Minnesota's court practices and procedures to "facilitate more effective and efficient case processing." The task force issued its reports and recommendations in December 2011 and May 2012.

Among its recommendations were creating a pilot program to expedite civil cases, and a specialized statewide complex case program. The pilot program recommendation became the Expedited Civil Litigation Track Pilot Project, commonly called the "rocket docket". In 2013, the first rocket dockets were established in Duluth and Dakota Counties. Abrams was judicial manager of the original rocket docket in Dakota County. Those two expedited dockets still exist (2024), and the rocket docket has been expanded into other Minnesota county courts, with an opt-in potential for all other judicial districts.

The task force recommendations also led to a statewide set of rules creating Minnesota's Complex Case Program. Abrams was likewise involved in shaping this specialized docket. Among other things, the Supreme Court proposed a model case management order for mandatory use in the new program. Abrams wrote to the Supreme Court suggesting that a single standardized form would be inappropriate in complex cases, and the text of case management orders should be entrusted to the trained specialist complex litigation judges who would be overseeing a given case. The final rules follow Abrams' advice.

Abrams is a co-author of the Minnesota publication, Business Disputes: Claims and Remedies Deskbook, writing the chapter on insurance coverage.

=== Civil justice activity nationally ===
In 2013, the Conference of Chief Justices (CCJ) created the Civil Justice Improvements Committee (CJI), as part of its civil justice initiative. The CCJ is a national organization whose members include the highest judicial officer of each state. This initiative aimed to develop innovations and best practices in civil courts to reduce costs and delays in rendering justice, while still preserving fairness, access to courts, and due process. The CCJ worked with the National Center for State Courts (NCSC) and the Institute for the Advancement of the American Legal System (IAALS) in putting together a widely experienced 23-member committee to carry out research and make recommendations. Abrams was selected as a member of the committee, and chaired its Rules and Litigation Subcommittee, one of the two subcommittees that carried out the bulk of the CJI's work (the other subcommittee being chaired by Judge Jennifer D. Bailey). In 2016, the CJI issued its report, Call to Action: Achieving Civil Justice for All, Recommendations to the Conference of Chief Justices by the Civil Justice Improvements Committee.

Abrams has been an NCSC board member. He is also a council member of the NCSC's Just Horizons Initiative. This initiative is "dedicated to helping courts anticipate and prepare for future challenges and opportunities affecting the delivery of high-quality justice to all who use our courts." Abrams serves as a liaison between the NCSC and the American College of Business Court Judges.

Abrams has been involved nationally with the study and development of specialized business courts, which were also a subject of the Minnesota task force's study on court practices and efficiency. He was vice-president of the American College of Business Court Judges (2024). He was a Business Court Representative to the American Bar Association's Business Law Section (2014–2016). He is a co-author of The Business Courts Benchbook, writing chapters on discovery management and electronic discovery. He also is co-author of An Electronic Discovery Primer.

Internationally, Abrams contributes to the Judicial Integrity Initiative of the United Nations Office on Drugs and Crime.

=== Notable cases ===
Among a few of Abrams notable cases, in 2010, Minnesota's Supreme Court assigned thousands of cases to Abrams involving potential challenges to the computer source code for a breathalyzer test used by Minnesota police to measure intoxication. Abrams decided the case in 2011, allowing the test, and the Supreme Court upheld that decision. In 2014, Abrams dismissed a case against Hebrew National challenging whether its hot dogs were kosher under varying rabbinical standards. Abrams found it was beyond the court's power to determine this religious question, which was subject to the First Amendment and separation of church and state issues. In 2019, Abrams' criminal sentence of a defendant, who had driven through a stop sign and killed a pedestrian while looking at a cell phone instead of the road, included a requirement that the driver visit the grave of the person killed.

== Legal practice ==
From 1997 until beginning his judicial service, Abrams was president of the private Minneapolis law firm Abrams and Smith. Similarly, Abrams worked at private law firms between 1982 and 1997. He worked at the Schoenberger Legal Clinic in Richfield and Rochester, Minnesota from 1981 to 1982, and was a law clerk with the Minneapolis Star Tribune in 1981. After retirement, Abrams joined the private alternative dispute resolution organization JAMS, serving as an arbitrator, mediator, and special master.

== Education and as educator ==
Abrams received a Bachelor of Arts degree from Beloit College in 1977, and a Juris Doctor degree from William Mitchell College of Law in 1981.

Abrams has served as an adjunct faculty member at the University of Minnesota Law School and the Mitchell Hamline School of Law.

== Positions and honors ==
Abrams has held the following positions or received the following honors, among others;

- Board, National Center for State Courts
- Board, American Board of Trial Advocates (ABOTA)
- Trial Judge of the Year, ABOTA (Minnesota) (2019)
- Award for Civility, Professionalism and Excellence, ABOTA (Minnesota) (2023)
- Co-chair, Judicial Independence Committee, ABOTA (2023)
- Member, Conference of Chief Justices Civil Justice Improvements Committee, and chair of its Rules and Litigation Subcommittee
- Member, Minnesota Supreme Court Civil Justice Reform Task Force
- Original judge, Expedited Civil Litigation Track Pilot Project (First Judicial District)
- Mentor, University of St. Thomas (2010-)
- Honorary Fellow, American College of Coverage Counsel
- President, Jewish Family Services of St. Paul
