= Jennifer D. Bailey =

American judge

Jennifer Drechsel Bailey

Judge, Eleventh Judicial Circuit Court, Miami-Dade County Florida
- In office 1993–2023

Personal details
- Education: University of Georgia (B.A. 1980); University of Georgia School of Law (J.D. 1983); Duke University School of Law (L.L.M. 2018)

Jennifer Drechsel Bailey is a retired American judge who served for 30 years in Florida's Eleventh Judicial Circuit Court in Miami-Dade County. She is recognized nationally, statewide, and locally for her work on improving justice in the civil litigation system through studying, understanding, and implementing effective changes to court and judicial case management.

== Judicial service ==
Bailey was elected as a judge to Florida's Eleventh Judicial Circuit Court in 1992, and began serving in 1993. Florida's circuit courts are trial level courts of general jurisdiction. Bailey was reelected multiple times to the Miami-based circuit court, and served until her retirement in November 2023.

Bailey served in the family, criminal, and civil divisions, and has been administrative judge of the civil division and the general jurisdiction division. She also served in the Complex Business Litigation Division, a specialized business court program with a jurisdiction limited to complex business and commercial disputes. In addition to being assigned as a specialist business court judge, Bailey was later designated as a judge to a specialized docket having jurisdiction over construction defect cases. In 2013, Chief Administrative Judge Bertila Soto issued an order creating the International Commercial Arbitration subsection within the Complex Business Litigation section. Bailey was named as one of the two original judges in this new court program. Bailey has at times also served as Acting Chief Judge.

During the COVID-19 pandemic, Bailey led the Pandemic Digital Workgroup, and created virtual courtrooms in the Eleventh circuit's courts. In July 2020, she also managed the first hybrid jury trial during COVID, consulting with a team of infectious disease experts.

=== Mortgage foreclosure crisis judge ===
Bailey chaired the Florida Supreme Court Task Force on Residential Mortgage Foreclosure Cases, which was created to address the home mortgage foreclosure crisis that began in the late 2000s. Bailey described Miami as ground zero in the foreclosure crisis with the numbers tripling after 2007. This statewide task force's final report focused on early mandatory mediation as a means to alleviate some aspects of this crisis and achieve better outcomes. In early 2010, the Eleventh circuit implemented a mandatory mediation program in foreclosure cases in Miami, based on the task force's recommended model. Bailey coordinated the Miami circuit court program to address the crisis "via case management processes that helped resolve foreclosure cases in a timely manner while protecting litigants’ rights...."

=== As a judicial educator ===
Bailey served as Dean of the Florida College of Advanced Judicial Studies from 2000 to 2005. This a judicial education program within the Florida Court Education Council (FCEC). The dean's responsibilities include, among other things, administrative oversight, setting policies and goals, curriculum assessment, faculty recruitment and determining faculty qualifications, program planning and instructional material developments, and faculty and staff support. The dean is also responsible to report to the FCEC and Florida Supreme Court. The dean is selected based upon experience as a judge; experience presenting judicial education; interpersonal and group communication skills; demonstrated leadership, inspiration, and supervision qualities; and accessibility and collegiality toward people in every facet of the program. Bailey also has been on the faculty of the Florida New Judges College, and was appointed by Florida Supreme Court Chief Justices as vice-chair of the FCEC, where she was also on the faculty.

Nationally, she has also taught as faculty or as a presenter for the National Center for State Courts (NCSC), the Conference of Chief Justices (CCJ), the Conference of State Court Administrators (COSCA), and the National Association for Court Management (NACOM).

=== National and local leader in improving justice in civil courts ===
==== Civil Justice Improvements Committee work ====
In 2013, the Conference of Chief Justices (CCJ) created the Civil Justice Improvements Committee, as part of its civil justice initiative. This initiative aimed to develop innovations and best practices in civil courts to reduce costs and delays in rendering justice, while still preserving fairness, access to courts, and due process. The CCJ worked with the National Center for State Courts (NCSC) and the Institute for the Advancement of the American Legal System (IAALS) in putting together a widely experienced 23-member committee to carry out research and make recommendations. Bailey was a member of the committee, and co-chaired its Rules/Procedures and Court Operations Subcommittees. In 2016, the Committee issued its report, Call to Action: Achieving Civil Justice for All, Recommendations to the Conference of Chief Justices by the Civil Justice Improvements Committee.

Subsequently, Miami's circuit court was selected as one of four Civil Justice Initiative Pilot Project courts, provided with a one-year grant to implement the NCSC committee's recommendations, and measure the results. The grant was for 2017. Bailey headed the Miami court pilot project. The Eleventh circuit issued a Performance Report in 2018 on the pilot project. The NCSC's evaluation of the Miami pilot project, which focused on the creation of civil case management teams, concluded it had higher closure rates and faster disposition times than the standard case management practices in the Miami court. The NCSC earlier had developed a Guide to Building Civil Case Management Teams, with Bailey's assistance, among others.

In 2018, Bailey co-authored the Miami Civil Case Management Manual. The manual defines "case management" generally as "the entire set of actions that a court takes to monitor and control the progress of cases," from a case's initiation until the last events in a case, "to ensure that justice is administrated promptly and cost effectively." It quotes Bailey on the kind of case management necessary to achieve these ends: "Active Case management provides real-world solutions for the real-world problems of cost, access and delay that litigants and lawyers experience everyday.”

In 2021, Bailey was named to the 24-member NCSC Board of Directors.

In 2023, she co-presented Experiments in Measuring the Effectiveness of Case Management Techniques at the UCLA-Rand Center for Law and Public Policy Conference meeting, Rethinking Case Management and the Process of Civil Justice Reform.

==== Florida case management leadership and work ====
In 2016, the Florida Supreme Court formed a two-year Commission on Trial Court Performance and Accountability. This was done in the context of overlapping objectives with The Long Range Strategic Plan for the Florida Judicial Branch 2016–2021. Bailey was made a member of the commission from July 1, 2016, to June 30, 2018, and served on its Performance Management Workgroup. She chaired its Data Quality Workgroup. Per the Supreme Court's Administrative Order establishing the commission, its purpose was "to propose policies and procedures on matters related to the efficient and effective functioning of Florida’s trial courts through the development of comprehensive resource management, performance measurement, and accountability programs."

Bailey was later appointed as a member of the Judicial Management Council's Workgroup on the Improved Resolution of Civil Cases. Like the earlier workgroup, this was within the context of the Long-Range Strategic Plan for the Florida Judicial Branch 2016–21. She played a significant role in its final report issued in 2021, and the research and ideas from her article, Why Don't Judges Case Manage?, were cited throughout the report. She has described her selection to serve on this workgroup as one of the highest honors she has received.

Bailey has expressed an institutional concern that younger lawyers are not gaining sufficient trial experience, in light of more senior lawyers not yielding opportunities to them to try cases.

== Education and as educator ==
Bailey received her Bachelor of Arts degree, magna cum laude, from the Peabody School of Journalism at the University of Georgia in 1980. She received her Juris Doctor degree from the University of Georgia School of Law in 1983. In 2018, she earned a Master of Laws degree in Judicial Studies from Duke University Law School.

Her graduate thesis, Why Don't Judges Case Manage?, was published as a 150-page article in the University of Miami Law Review in 2019. In writing her thesis, Bailey "surveyed more than 300 Florida judges and conduct[ed] more than 20 comprehensive judicial interviews" to develop an empirical analysis of judicial attitudes and practices toward case management.

Bailey has been an adjunct professor and lecturer at the University of Miami School of Law.

== Positions and memberships ==
Bailey has held the following positions or memberships, among others;

- Administrative Judge, Civil Division, Eleventh Judicial Circuit of Florida
- Member, Board of Directors of the National Center for State Courts
- Member, Board of Advisors for the Institute for the Advancement of the American Legal System (IAALS)
- Member, IAALS Public Trust and Confidence Project Steering Committee
- Member, Conference of Chief Justices/Conference of State Court Administrators’ Pandemic Rapid Response Team, Civil Courts and Technology Subcommittees
- Editorial Board, Judicature
- Member, Florida Bar Business Courts Task Force
- Chair, Court Operations subcommittee of the Civil Justice Initiative (2013–2016)
- Chair, Florida Supreme Court Residential Mortgage Foreclosure Task Force (2009)
- Member, Executive Committee, Florida Commission on Trial Court Performance and Accountability
- Chair, Data Quality Workgroup, Florida Commission on Trial Court Performance and Accountability
- Member, Workgroup on Improved Resolution of Civil Cases, Florida Judicial Management Council
- Member, Court Statistics and Workload Committee, Florida Judicial Management Council
- Chair, Florida Bar Civil Procedure Rules Committee
- Member, Florida Supreme Court Civil Jury Instruction Committee
- Member, Florida Supreme Court Business/Contracts Jury Instruction Committee
- Leader, Pandemic Digital Workgroup

== Awards and honors ==
Bailey has received the following awards and honors, among others;

- Florida Justice Association's Krupnick Award for Perseverance (2021)
- Miami Dade Justice Association's Manny Crespo Award (2019)
- Jurist of the Year, Florida chapter of the American Board of Trial Advocates (2015)
- Sabadell Community Service Award (2013)
- Daily Business Review Sookie Williams Community Service Award
- Equal Justice Judicial Leadership Award from Legal Services of Greater Miami (2011)
- Warren Burger Society, National Center for State Courts
