= Courts of Florida =

Courts of Florida include:

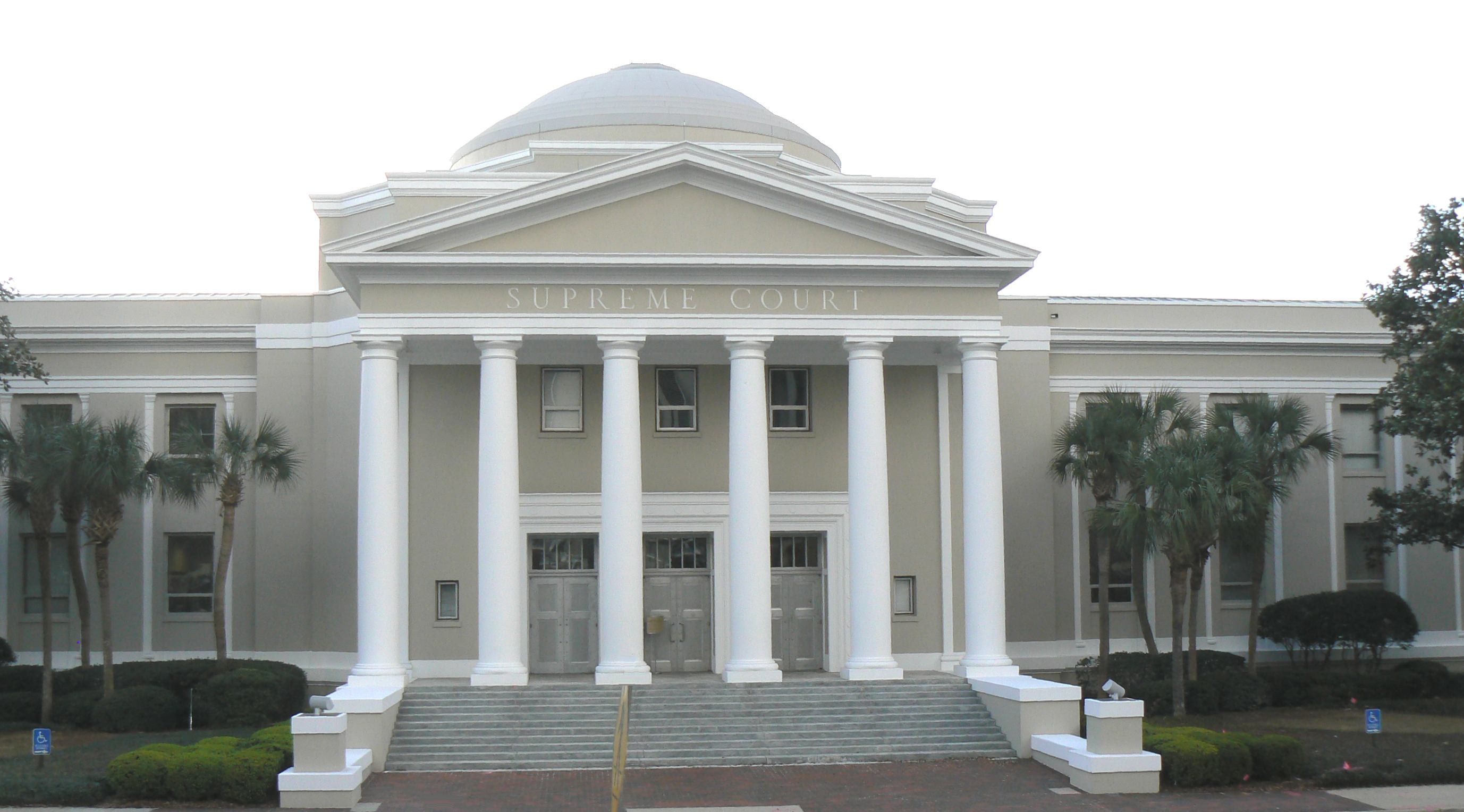
Headquarters of the Florida Supreme Court in Tallahassee.

State courts of Florida

- Florida Supreme Court
  - District courts of appeal (6 districts)
    - Circuit courts (20 judicial circuits)
      - County courts (67 courts, one for each county)

Federal courts located in Florida

- United States District Court for the Northern District of Florida
- United States District Court for the Middle District of Florida
- United States District Court for the Southern District of Florida

Former federal courts of Florida

- United States District Court for the District of Florida (extinct, subdivided)

== See also ==
- Florida State Courts System
