= Thomas Benton Smith (judge) =

Magistrate Judge, United States District Court for the Middle District of Florida
- In office July 25, 2011 – 2021
- Appointed by: Unanimously chosen by the Judges of United States District Court for the Middle District of Florida

Judge, Ninth Judicial Circuit Court of Florida (Orange and Osceola Counties)
- In office 2002–2011
- Appointed by: Governor Jeb Bush (subsequently elected)
- Succeeded by: John Jordan

Personal details
- Born: November 12, 1952 Muskegon, Michigan
- Died: September 7, 2023 (aged 70) Orlando, Florida
- Education: Florida Southern College; University of South Florida (B.A. 1974); University of Florida Levin College of Law (J.D. 1977)

Thomas Benton Smith (November 12, 1952 - September 7, 2023) was an American judge serving for 20 years in the federal and state courts of Florida. He inspired the creation of Florida's first specialized business court, and was considered a leader on improving the quality and efficiency of business litigation.

== Early life and education ==
Smith was born on November 12, 1952, in Muskegon, Michigan. He was the only child of Benton and Medrith Smith. When he was five-years old the family moved to New Smyrna Beach, Florida, and then two years later to Orlando. He graduated from Edgewater High School in 1970.

Smith first attended Florida Southern College, and then later obtained his Bachelor of Arts degree from the University of South Florida in 1974. He received a Juris Doctor degree from the University of Florida College of Law (now the University of Florida Levin College of Law) in 1977.

== Legal practice ==
Smith was admitted to the Florida bar in 1978, and began his legal career as a solo practitioner that same year. He became an Assistant State Attorney in Florida's Ninth Judicial Circuit in 1979. In 1982, he became a business litigator at the private law firm of Maguire, Voorhis & Wells, P.A. for 16 years. In 1998, he became a law partner at the national and international law firm Holland & Knight, LLP.

== Judicial service ==
=== State court judge ===
In December 2001, Florida Governor Jeb Bush appointed Smith as a judge of Florida's Ninth Judicial Circuit Court, covering Orange and Osceola Counties. He was later successfully elected as a Circuit Court judge. He served as a Circuit Court judge from early 2002 until 2011, when he became a United States magistrate judge in the United States District Court of the Middle District of Florida. He was replaced on the Ninth Circuit by John Jordan.

Smith first served in the Ninth Circuit Court's criminal division and then its domestic division. During his early time on the court, in 2003, Smith pursued the concept of establishing a specialized business court in the Ninth Circuit with Chief Judge Belvin Perry. This would be a specialized court program with jurisdiction over complex business and commercial cases, with a single judge hearing the case from beginning to end. Smith's goal was to "give Orlando-area businesses greater certainty, consistency and efficiency in the courtroom -- with judges who know business law, make consistent rulings and move cases through the system quickly".

Later in 2003, Perry issued orders creating the Specialized Business Court Sub-Division of the Civil Division of the Circuit Court, which would become operational in January 2004. This was the first functioning business court in Florida's state court system. Judge Renee A. Roche served as the first business court judge. In 2009, Smith himself served as the Ninth Circuit's Business Court judge. The Ninth Circuit's Business Court inspired other Florida circuits to create their own business courts.

While a Florida state court judge, the Florida Supreme Court made him the first chair of its newly established Committee on Standard Jury Instruction–Contract and Business Cases. Nationally, Smith was a founder and director of the American College of Business Court Judges (ACBCJ), and he, Perry, and Roche all participated in the first meeting of the ACBCJ in 2005.

=== Federal judiciary ===
In 2011, the Judges of the United States District Court for the Middle District of Florida unanimously selected Smith to serve as a Magistrate Judge for the Middle District of Florida. He retired from that position in 2019, but was recalled for two more years, fully retiring in 2021.

The position of federal magistrate judge was created by Congress in 1968. Magistrate judges are federal judicial officers, but they are appointed by a vote of United States District Court Judges in a judicial district, rather than by the President of the United States and the United States Senate. Although not as broad as the powers held by district court judges, magistrate judges have a wide range of authority, and can even preside as judges over civil trials if the parties all agree. Among their many functions, they often entertain pretrial motions and hearings.

== Legacy, positions and honors ==
Smith was considered "a pioneer known both statewide and nationally for his cutting edge innovations in the field of business litigation[,]" in part based on his expertise in addressing developing technologies and electronic discovery. As a magistrate judge, his written decisions on discovery of electronically stored information have been looked to for guidance on grasping issues dealing with this type of technical discovery.

More generally to all cases, Smith provided the following advice in a 2019 federal judicial order, on how opponents should and should and should not communicate during the litigation process: "Both sides need to learn that frequently the best response to immature behavior is to ignore it. Don't react, don't sink to the other side's level, don't try to fight fire with fire. There are disagreements in every case, that is what litigation is about. Most adversaries work out their disagreements while remaining calm and professional."

Smith held the following positions and received the following honors, among others;

- Member (20 years), Executive Council of the Business Law Section of the Florida Bar
- First chair appointed to Florida Supreme Court Committee on Standard Jury Instructions – Contract and Business Cases
- Federal Judicial Chair, State and Federal Court Judicial Liaison Committee, Florida Bar Business Law Section
- Director, George C. Young First Central Florida Inn of Court and the Central Florida Family Law Inn of Court
- James G. Glazebrook Professionalism and Service Award, from the George C. Young American Inn of Court (2013)
- A founder, director and member of the American College of Business Court Judges

== Death ==
Smith died on September 7, 2023, at his home in Orlando, Florida, surrounded by his loved ones. He was survived by his wife Jill, two children, and two grandchildren.
