= TourBeat =

- Company type: Private
- Industry: Concerts
- Founded: December 2014
- Key people: Julian Gonzalez (Managing Director)
- Website: tourbeat.com

TourBeat is a service that aggregates "concert tickets from around the web" and provides a database of "information and insights related to the music industry." Its service differs from others that dispatch concert tickets in that it does not resell tickets, but rather, "offers a membership program that will be valued at the same price as an average commission." The company was founded in 2014 and "has grown at a rate of 500% per month every month." As such, Julian Gonzalez, the Managing Director of TourBeat says the "company’s mission is to provide concert goers with the opportunity to get to their favorite artists’ live performances as often as possible, as cheaply as possible." The company's project, TourBus Economics, which aggregates information regarding concert tours into a single database, has requested the participation of musicians, managers, and producers in order to achieve its goal of publishing a digital book. Included in the database is "concert dates and cities, the songs being played live by the touring artist, and the artist's discography". With its geotagging feature, individuals can determine music artists playing in their local area and receive alerts regarding their concerts.

== Temporary Injunction ==
On November 3, 2015, legal action was taken against TourBeat by Lightning Marketing Group, LLC and its Managing Director, John Drabkowski, who own and operate the concert ticket website, ConcertFix.com. A Motion for Temporary Injunction was filed against Ramon “Julian” Gonzalez along with Mykhaylo “Misha” Kovalchuc and parent company Gerumic LLC concluding they used and misappropriated the protected information of trade secrets without permission while employed by Lightning Marketing Group to build and operate a business that directly competes with ConcertFix.

On December 12, 2016, Judge Migna Sanchez-LLorens of the Eleventh Judicial Circuit Court of Florida issued a court order on the Motion for a Temporary Injunction against Gonzalez, Kovalchuc and Gerumic enjoining them "from any further internet sales activity under www.tourbeat.com or any other internet sales website which is based upon Plaintiff's misappropriating trade secrets". The judge cited the Florida Uniform Trade Secrets Act: Florida Statutes § 688.002(4), § 688.002(2)(b) and (c) and § 688.003(1) as the basis for the decision.

== See also ==
- Internet Movie Database (IMDb)
- All Media Network
