= W. Lawrence Fitch =

W. Lawrence Fitch is an American attorney, and an authority on mental disability and the law.

== Biography ==
Fitch is clinical professor of psychiatry at the University of Maryland Medical School and adjunct professor of law at the University of Maryland Law School. Fitch served as Director of Forensic Services for the Maryland Mental Hygiene Administration from 1994–2013. From 1978 to 1982 he was a research attorney with the Institute on Mental Disability and the Law at the National Center for State Courts and from 1982 to 1994 was an associate professor at the University of Virginia Law School and a Director of the Forensic Evaluation Training and Research Center at the University’s Institute of Law, Psychiatry and Public Policy.
