= Pine Crest School =

Private prep school in South Florida

Coordinates: 26°22′27.50″N 80°8′9.78″W

- Fort Lauderdale and Boca Raton, Florida; United States

Information
- Type: Independent, Non-sectarian
- Motto: Education. Character. Leadership.
- Established: 1934; 92 years ago
- President: Dana Markham
- Faculty: 210
- Enrollment: 2,707 (2 campuses) (2025–26)
- Campus: Suburban, 78 acres (320,000 m^{2}), Ft. Lauderdale campus 20 acres (81,000 m^{2}), Boca Raton campus
- Colors: Forest Green and White
- Mascot: Panthers
- Tuition 2022-2023: $42,290 (grades 9–12), $38,140 (grades 6–8), $35,015 (grades 1–5), $33,855 (kindergarten), $33,785 (pre-kindergarten)
- Website: www.pinecrest.edu

Pine Crest School is a private preparatory school with campuses in Fort Lauderdale and Boca Raton, Florida. It was founded in Fort Lauderdale in 1934 by Mae McMillan, who also served as the school's first president. The Boca Raton campus, originally Boca Raton Academy, was absorbed by Pine Crest in 1991 and hosts students in pre-kindergarten through grade 8. The Fort Lauderdale campus hosts students in pre-kindergarten through grade 12.

== History ==
Mae McMillan founded the school in 1934 in rented rooms in downtown Fort Lauderdale. In 1939, when there were 100 students, the school moved to a former hospital building on an eight-acre site on East Broward Boulevard in 1939, and student boarding began. A nearby site was purchased for an elementary school. The school was incorporated in 1959, and it moved to the current 49-acre site on NE 62nd Street in 1965. The Boca Raton campus for pre-kindergarten to grade 8 students, originally Boca Raton Academy, became part of Pine Crest School in 1991. The boarding program ended in 2001.

== Campuses ==
=== Fort Lauderdale campus ===
The Mae McMillan campus has expanded since it first opened. A building campaign at the start of the 21st century saw the construction of a new middle school building, Findeiss Auditorium, a parking garage, and the Huizenga Family Science Center. Athletic facilities include a new health and fitness center constructed in the original Lane Hall boys’ dormitory, a number of locker room facilities, two gymnasia, three pools, Banks Field, Elliot Track, and ten tennis courts. Additionally, the adjacent Freidt campus, commonly referred to as “West Campus,” has a number of playing fields, a boathouse for the crew team, and a nature trail centered on Lake Leone. Fine Arts facilities include the Stacy Chapel and Auditorium, Palmer Dance Studio, McMillian Fine Arts Center, Stacy Arts and Activities Center, and Egan Auditorium. As of 2010, the LEED Gold certified Chiller Plant Building has been completed, providing a chilled water feed to the entire campus.

As of 2011, the new Upper School Academic Center has been completed, consolidating the academic functions of the Upper School, which were previously scattered among various buildings, into a single complex. The center of the campus has the Bell Tower, which houses both the Admissions and Administrative Offices. In 2015, state-of-the-art Innovation Labs opened on both campuses and for each division of the school.

=== Boca Raton campus ===
For many years, the Boca Raton campus functioned out of the original Boca Raton Academy buildings, which were eventually wrapped with loggias in true Pine Crest character to match the Silvers/Rubenstein Library Media Center, Rochelle Levitetz Fine Arts Building, Parents' Association Performing Arts Center, and replication of the Fort Lauderdale campus bell tower, which were built by Pine Crest. As of 2009, the Boca Raton Campus has a new middle school building and dining hall extensions, and the Parents' Association Performing Arts Center was rebuilt after the roof collapsed in the summer of 2004. As of 2010, Pine Crest Boca has finished construction on the new lower school replacement building, which achieved LEED for School Gold Certification from the United States Green Building Council (USGBC).

== Organization ==
Pine Crest is accredited by Cognia, Florida Council of Independent Schools (FCIS) and Southern Association of Independent Schools (SAIS).

== Academics ==
Pine Crest School offers 39 Advanced Placement and 17 Post-AP courses in the Upper School.

Pine Crest has also been named a "Blue Ribbon School" by the United States Department of Education. In the 2004–2005 school year, three students were named presidential scholars by the U.S. Department of Education, the first time more than two students in Florida were given the award; usually two students per state are awarded (six total were awarded to Florida students in 2005). In October 2006, 21 members of the Class of 2007 were named National Merit Semifinalists by the National Merit Scholarship Corporation, the second most semifinalists of any school in Florida's history. Pine Crest is consistently among the top 25 private schools in the nation for its performance in the competition. In 2016, Pine Crest School 7th graders won "Best in the Nation" in the Verizon App Challenge, which includes a $20,000 grant.

=== Reputation and rankings ===
According to The Washington Post in 2012, Pine Crest School ranked second in the nation based on its index. According to the 2017 Niche Rankings, Pine Crest School is the #1 Best Private School in Florida.

== Demographics ==
In 2022, ProPublica reported the student body was 79.3% White and 4.6% Black, while the local school district was 19.0% White and 38.7% Black.

== Student life ==
As of 2025 the total enrollment for Fort Lauderdale and Boca Raton was 2,707 students.

Each year, Pine Crest awards a student the competitive Coleman Prize, which pays for half of the recipient's senior year tuition, and is not based on financial need.

=== Publications ===
Pine Crest School students produce publications including the school newspaper The Paw Print, a literary magazine The Scribbler, the Institute for Civic Involvement newsletter The ICI Newsletter, and the nationally award-winning school yearbook, The Crestian. Pine Crest also publishes an alumni publication, The Magazine.

Pine Crest has two television stations, PCNN for middle school, and PCTV for upper school. PCTV and PCNN have won numerous national awards from Student Television Network (STN), Florida Scholastic Press Association (FSPA) and more.

=== Performing and visual arts ===
Pine Crest's arts program covers visual and performing arts. Facilities include the Palmer Dance Studio, Mae McMillan Fine Arts Center, and Stacy Auditorium, which hosts the annual ballet, musical, and several jazz and music performances. Practice facilities for music also exist, along with art studios and facilities for photography. Art is taught from an early age, and students can opt out of physical fitness classes for formal ballet training.

Pine Crest acknowledges its best fine arts students through its annual Founder's Council awards. The Founder's Council was established by Pine Crest School founder Dr. Mae McMillan in 1968. The council's mission is to support the arts at Pine Crest, which is done through the Student Cultural Arts Series, which includes the Upper School play, ballet, band, choral and strings concerts, the musical, and the art exhibit. Every year, students who have demonstrated excellence in these categories are recognized in the Founder's Council assembly as a tribute to Dr. McMillan.

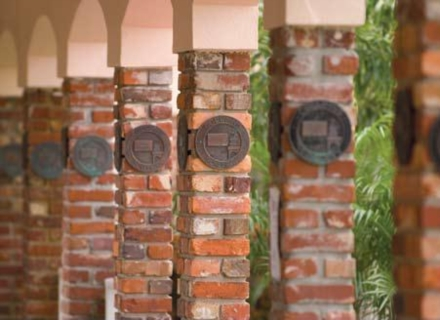
Traditional Brick Columns on the Pine Crest campus

=== Debate ===
Members of the Pine Crest policy debate team were the 1976 National Forensics Champions and the Florida Novice State Champions in 2004, 2008, and 2009. Members of the team were also in the quarterfinals of the prestigious Wake Forest Debate Tournament in 2008 and 2009. The team has placed in the quarterfinals of the Tournament of Champions and recently qualified two teams to the Tournament of Champions in 2011 and 2012, one team in 2013, three teams in 2014, and were state champions in 2010, 2011, 2012, 2013 and 2014. Members of the team also won the Florida Blue Key debate tournament in 2010, and the Wake Forest University National Earlybird Tournament in 2013.

== Athletics ==
Pine Crest has varsity, junior-varsity (JV) and middle school sports teams, including football, cheerleading, lacrosse, golf, crew, cross country, track & field, soccer, baseball, softball, basketball, volleyball, swimming & diving, tennis, weightlifting, and sailing. Athletics are divided into fall, winter, and spring sports, with some programs holding practices during all three seasons.

In basketball, two-time Gatorade National Boys' Basketball Player of the Year Brandon Knight led the team to Class 3A state titles in 2008 and 2009. In July 2010, Knight was also named the National Player of the Year at a ceremony prior to the ESPY Awards in Los Angeles.

The Pine Crest boys' lacrosse team was the SFHSL champion in 1994 and FHSLA champion in 2002. The swim team won a national championship in 1993. Both boys’ and girls’ teams won 2A state titles in 2019 and the girls’ repeated in 2020. The girls' tennis team won the state title in 2015, and girls' cross country broke The Bolles School's dynasty, taking the crown in 2016 and 2017 and 2019.

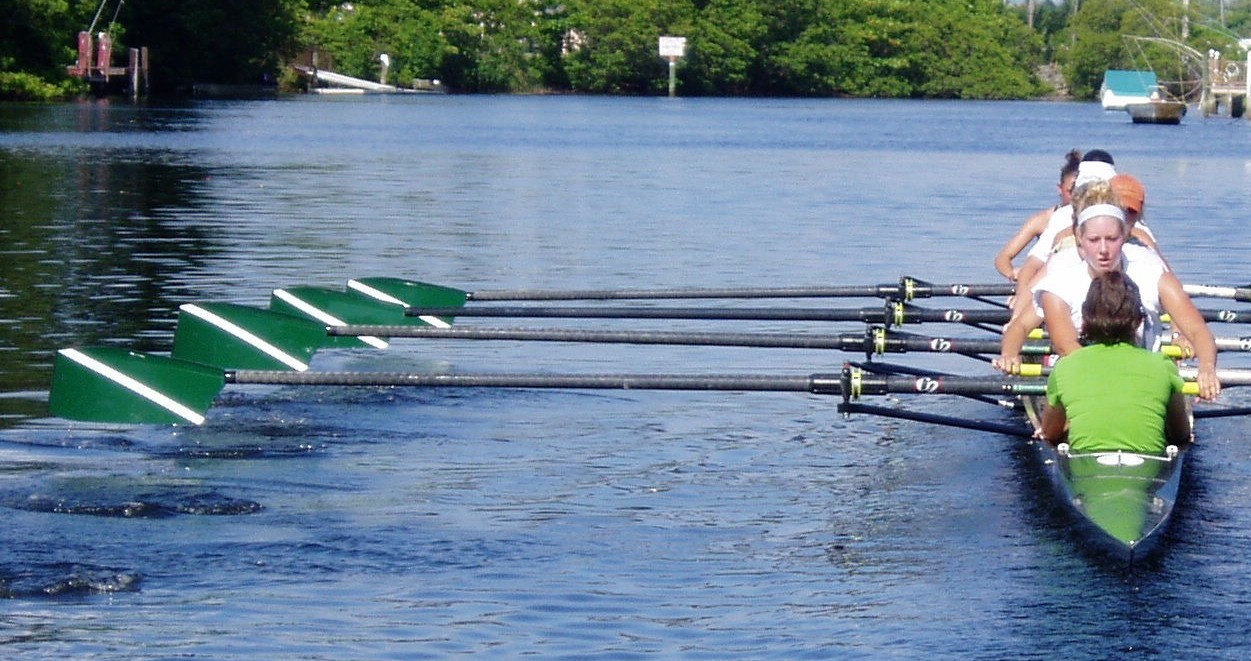
Crew Team at Pine Crest

The crew team attends regattas most weekends from February through May and sends over 20 rowers each year to the preliminaries for the CRASH-B Sprints. In 2010, the varsity women's team placed second at the SRAA (Scholastic Rowing Association of America) championships. and in 2012 the varsity men's team placed second in the lightweight eight event at the SRAA (Scholastic Rowing Association of America) championships. In 2017, the men's and women's varsity crew teams attended the Head of the Charles regatta in Boston, Massachusetts.

=== State champion teams ===
- 29 Girls' Swimming & Diving (1956, 1957, 1958, 1959, 1960, 1961, 1962, 1963, 1964, 1965, 1966, 1967, 1968, 1969, 1970, 1971, 1972, 1973, 1974, 1975, 1976, 1978, 1985, 1986, 1988, 1989, 1990, 2019, 2020)
- 17 Boys' Swimming & Diving (1957, 1958, 1959, 1962, 1963, 1966, 1968, 1969, 1970, 1971, 1973, 1974, 1975, 1984, 1985, 1987, 2019)
- 9 Girls' Crew (1994, 1995 (2), 1996 (2), 1997, 2003, 2004, 2015)
- 7 Boys' Crew (1995, 1996, 1997, 1998, 2004, 2012, 2013)
- 4 Boys' Basketball (2008, 2009, 2012, 2021)
- 3 Girls' Cross Country (2016, 2017, 2019)
- 3 Girls' Volleyball (2001, 2002, 2003)
- 2 Boys' Lacrosse (1994, 2002)
- 2 Girls' Tennis (1981: co-champion, 2015)
- 1 Boys' Golf (1996)
- 1 Boys' Tennis (2012)

== Notable alumni ==
Notable alumni include:

- Reed Alexander, actor
- Amir Arison, actor
- Jayne Atkinson, British-American actress
- Kevin Boothe, football player
- Andy Buckley, actor/stockbroker
- Mary Carey, entertainer/reality TV persona
- Bernadette Castro, businesswoman/politician
- Michael Cohen, composer
- Stephen F. Cohen, professor
- Jonathan Cohn, author and journalist
- Andy Dean, talk show host/political commentator
- Jordan Faison, college football and lacrosse player
- Bethenny Frankel, talk show host/author
- Mark Gilbert, Major League Baseball player/ambassador to New Zealand and Samoa
- Marshall Godschalk, world champion Dutch rower
- Dan Goldman, writer/artist
- Jack Goldsmith, law professor
- Kelsey Grammer, actor/singer
- Ariana Grande, actor/singer
- Frankie Grande, reality television personality/dancer/actor
- Max Greyserman (born 1995), professional golfer on the PGA Tour
- Farris Hassan, activist
- Wayne Huizenga, businessman
- Brandon Knight, basketball player
- Kira Kosarin, actress
- Jeff Marx, composer
- John Medeski, composer
- Haley Moss, artist/author/attorney
- Diana Nyad, marathon swimmer/author
- Lance Oppenheim, filmmaker
- Robin S. Rosenbaum, U.S. Circuit Court judge
- Vesna Stojanovska, Macedonian swimmer
- Amen Thompson, basketball player
- Ausar Thompson, basketball player
- Laurel Touby, journalist/businesswoman
- Frederic Wakeman, professor
