= Victoria Sigler =

American judge (born 1951)

Victoria S. Sigler

Judge of the Miami-Dade County Circuit Court
- Incumbent
- Assumed office January 2000
- Appointed by: Jeb Bush

Personal details
- Born: 1951 (age 74–75) Albuquerque, New Mexico
- Education: Colorado State University (B.A./M.A.); Nova University (J.D.)

Victoria S. Sigler (born 1951) is a judge of the Miami-Dade County Circuit Court. She was the first openly gay circuit judge in Florida.

== Early life and education ==
Sigler was born in Albuquerque, New Mexico in 1951. When Sigler was seven years old, her family moved to the Sacramento suburb of Carmichael, California. She attended Colorado State University, where she earned a Bachelor of Arts and a Master of Arts, both in political science. Sigler then attended Nova University (now known as Nova Southeastern University) and earned her Juris Doctor degree in 1980.

== Judicial service ==
On January 4, 1994 Judge Sigler became the first out County Court Judge, having successfully run for the position. On January 26, 2000, Florida Governor Jeb Bush announced his appointment of Sigler to the Circuit Court in Miami-Dade County.

== See also ==
- List of LGBT jurists in the United States
