= Farris Hassan =

American journalist and financial analyst

- Born: July 30, 1989 (age 37)
- Education: Pine Crest School; Amherst College
- Occupations: Journalist, financial analyst, hedge fund manager
- Known for: Taking an unannounced and unaccompanied trip to Iraq aged 16
- Website: www.farrishassan.com

Farris Hassan (born July 30, 1989) is an American who at 16 years old, while a junior at Pine Crest School in Fort Lauderdale, Florida, took an unaccompanied trip to Iraq. He said he was inspired by a personal attachment to the situation in Iraq and an English class having a project on "immersion journalism". Global news outlets reported that Hassan left home for Iraq without telling his parents. Hassan's parents, now divorced, are Iraqi-born but immigrated to the United States, where they have lived for 35 years.

== Journey to Iraq ==
Hassan set off on December 11, 2005 flying from Miami International Airport to Kuwait City, arriving on December 13 at 12:05 a.m, and stopping in Amsterdam on December 12. In Kuwait he first called his parents telling them that he wanted to travel to Baghdad. Failing to cross the Iraqi border by taxi, he then flew to Beirut, Lebanon, where he stayed with friends of the family and interviewed a media relations officer of Hezbollah. On December 25, he took a plane to Baghdad International Airport. He then interviewed Iraqis and American soldiers about the situation in Iraq and looked for a humanitarian organization where he could do volunteer work. On December 28, he was picked up by the 101st Airborne Division. The U.S. embassy then issued a statement on December 30, stating that Hassan had departed Baghdad, and was safely on board a return flight back to the United States.

== The Society for Love & Justice ==
The Society for Love & Justice is a humanitarian organization that Farris Hassan established with support from members of his community in 2006.

Projects have included:

- Sending school supplies to refurbish schools in Iraq
- Sending student written letters to American soldiers in Iraq
- An inter-faith outreach group dedicated to promoting unity, goodwill, and greater tolerance between the Christian, Jewish, and Muslim communities. Associated with the Interfaith Outreach Group are South Florida's Temple Beth Emet, El Azhar Islamic School, and Pine Crest School.

Hassan is now an adviser to socially responsible companies such as QuickMedCards and InstaCraft.

== Summer 2007 trip to Afghanistan ==
In July 2007, Hassan went to Kabul, Afghanistan. Hassan said he went to examine the reconstruction of the country, the development of women's rights and education after 25 years of war, how civil problems such as the enormous number of street children and lack of infrastructure are being met, and to see what he could do to help. He visited several schools for girls and disadvantaged children, women's advocacy/support organizations, centers that aid street children, and various humanitarian NGOs. Hassan did not tell anyone of his leaving to Afghanistan until he was in the Middle East. During his trip, he talked to women politicians and worked on a project to build a school for gifted children.

== Education and finance career ==
Hassan studied for a time at Amherst College. Following his junior year at Amherst he became a financial analyst for Morgan Stanley, which he left in 2012 to found a hedge fund.
