= Peggy Quince =

American judge

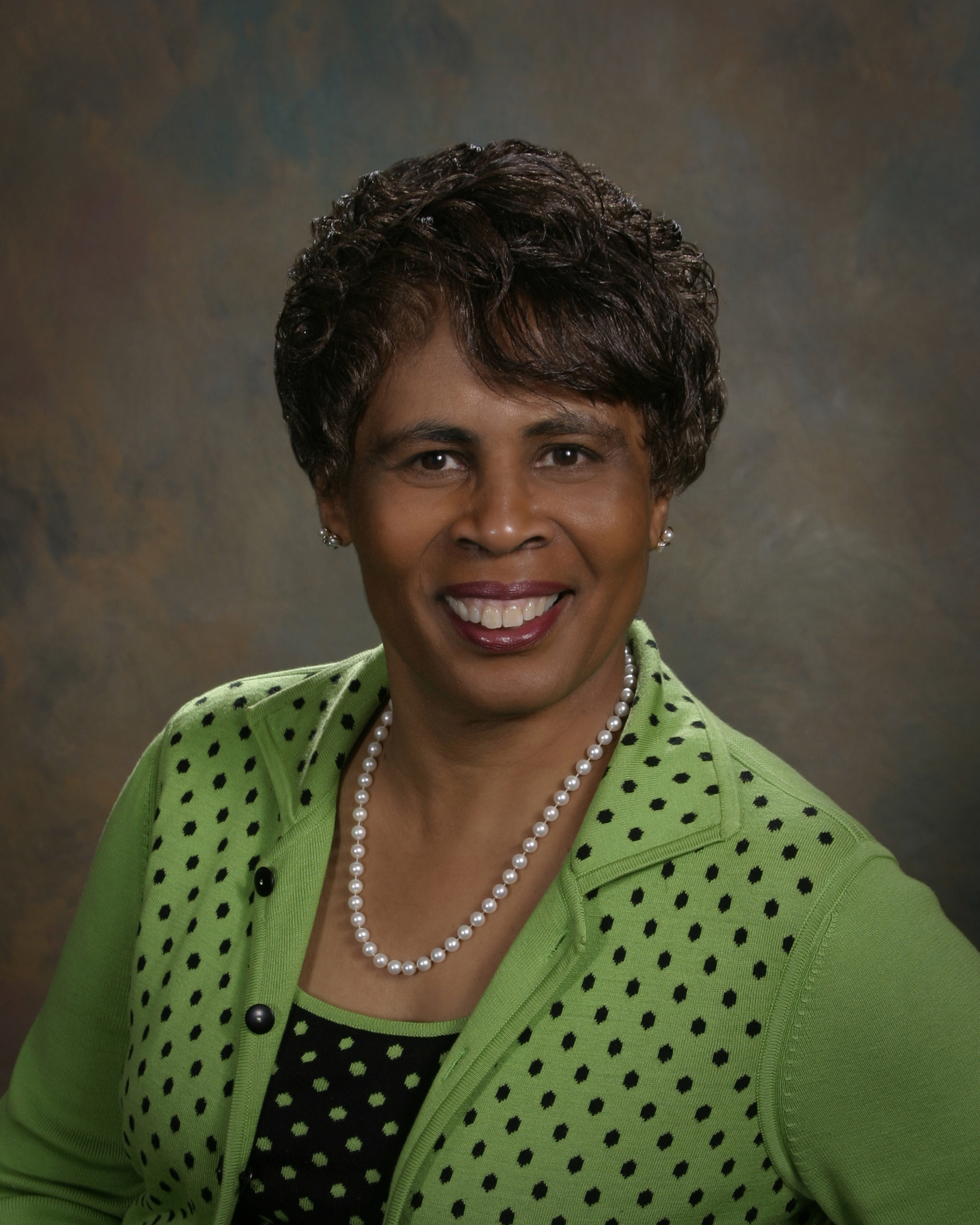
- Official portrait, 2006

Chief Justice of the Florida Supreme Court
- In office July 1, 2008 – June 30, 2010
- Preceded by: R. Fred Lewis
- Succeeded by: Charles Canady

Justice of the Supreme Court of Florida
- In office January 5, 1999 – January 8, 2019
- Preceded by: Ben F. Overton
- Succeeded by: Carlos G. Muñiz

Personal details
- Born: Peggy Ann Quince; January 3, 1948 (age 78) Norfolk, Virginia, U.S.
- Education: Howard University; Catholic University of America (JD)
- Website: Official Site

Peggy Ann Quince (born January 3, 1948) is an American lawyer who served as a justice of the Supreme Court of Florida, having previously served as the 53rd chief justice from July 1, 2008, until June 30, 2010. Quince was the second African American and third woman to serve as chief justice. She had been a justice of the Court since 1999, and was the first African-American woman to sit on the state's highest Court and the third female Justice. From 1993 to 1997, she served as a judge on Florida's Second District Court of Appeal. On July 1, 2008, Quince assumed the office of Chief Justice of the Supreme Court of Florida for two years, the first African-American woman to head any branch of Florida government.

== Biography ==
Quince was raised by her father, Solomon Quince, a civilian employee of the United States Navy, in Chesapeake, Virginia. The second of five children, she had to attend segregated schools, but she excelled as a student. Quince attended Howard University as an undergraduate, and received her Juris Doctor from the Columbus School of Law at The Catholic University of America in 1975. Justice Quince is a member of Alpha Kappa Alpha. From 1980 to 1993, she worked in the Criminal Division of the Florida Attorney General's office, the last five years as bureau chief for death penalty appeals.

== Appointment ==
Quince is the only Supreme Court Justice in Florida history to be appointed simultaneously by more than one Governor. Because her term began the exact moment that Governor-elect Jeb Bush assumed his office, in order to avoid potential future controversy over her appointment, Bush worked out a joint agreement with lame duck Governor Lawton Chiles whereby they both agreed upon and jointly announced Quince's appointment in December 1998. When Chiles died of a heart attack a few days later, the task of signing Quince's commission to office fell to Chiles' temporary successor, Governor Buddy MacKay. Thus, three Governors were involved in Quince's appointment.

== See also ==
- List of African-American jurists
- List of first women lawyers and judges in Florida
- List of female state supreme court justices
