= National Association for Court Management =

The National Association for Court Management (NACM) is a non-profit organization in the United States that promotes professional management education for court administrators and judges.

In the United States and most other countries in the common law tradition, supervising judges continue their traditional role as the presiding authorities in the bureaucracy of court systems. However, the latter half of the twentieth century saw the increasing professionalization of non-judicial court administrators and staff. In many court systems today, responsibility for court operations is delegated almost entirely to professional court managers, freeing judges and their legal clerks to devote their time to the work of interpreting and applying the law.

The mission of NACM is to provide a national forum for court professionals and, more importantly, to promote the fair and impartial administration of justice. Through NACM, court administrators increase the publics’ understanding of the judicial system and provide for equal access to justice for all. The association offers court management an ethical code of conduct to promote professionalism and competence throughout the system. The association improves the profession through education, the exchange of information and ideas, and the application of best practices in management. NACM supports research to shape and develop the court management field. Court administrators are guardians of the independence of the judiciary as the 3rd and independent branch of government and they safeguard the impartiality of administration of the courts.

NACM collaborates in training programs with the National Center for State Courts, and the Institute for Court Management. NACM is well known for its creation of the Core Competencies in the late 1990s, which were revised as the Core®, in 2014. NACM has also drafted a Model Code of Conduct for Court Professionals.

NACM was founded in 1985 through the combination of two pre-existing associations: the National Association of Trial Court Administrators (founded in 1965) and the National Association for Court Administration (founded in 1968). It claims to be the largest organization of court management professionals in the world, with more than 1,800 members from the United States, Canada, Australia, and other countries.

The current president of NACM is Richard Pierce, currently working as a Judicial Programs Administrator in Harrisburg, Pennsylvania. NACM is headquartered in Williamsburg, Virginia.
