= Edith Atkinson =

Judge (juvenile court) in Dade County, Florida
- In office 1924–1932

Edith Meserve Atkinson (November 20, 1890 - August 14, 1983) was the first female judge elected to serve in Juvenile Court. Atkinson was elected in Dade County, Florida, and served from 1924 to 1932. She was also the founder of Girl Scouting in Miami, Florida.

Atkinson's election to the Juvenile Court in 1924 was a major victory for women fighting for positions in the judiciary. While many opposed the election or appointment to women in high positions, family and domestic courts were some of the first to welcome to the bench. Atkinson employed the gendered arguments to her advantage in her 1924 campaign, using the tagline "Vote for a woman for a woman's job", highlighting the usefulness in family courts of traits traditionally associated with women.

== See also ==
- Scouting in Florida
- List of first women lawyers and judges in Florida
