= Haley Moss =

American attorney, artist and writer

Haley Moss is an artist, attorney, author, and advocate for people with disabilities. Diagnosed at age three with high-functioning autism, Moss was non-verbal until the age of four.

Moss attended the Pine Crest School in Fort Lauderdale, Florida. She holds a Bachelor of Science in psychology and a Bachelor of Arts in criminology from the University of Florida; and she holds a Juris Doctor from the University of Miami School of Law. On January 11, 2019, she became the first openly autistic female attorney in the State of Florida.

Moss teaches undergraduate courses on autism and has spoken at TedxUMiami about how she believes attention is ambiguous.

== Publications ==
- Middle School: The Stuff Nobody Tells You About (AAPC Publishing, 2010; ISBN 978-1934575628)
- A Freshman Survival Guide for College Students with Autism Spectrum Disorders: The Stuff Nobody Tells You About!"(Jessica Kingsley Publishing, 2014; ISBN 978-1849059848)
- The Young Autistic Adult's Independence Handbook (Jessica Kingsley Publishing, 2021; ISBN 978-1787757578)
- Great Minds Think Differently: Neurodiversity for Lawyers and Other Professionals (ABA Book Publishing, 2021; ISBN 978-1641058957)

== See also ==
- List of first women lawyers and judges in Florida
