= Louise R. Pinnell =

American lawyer

Louise Rebecca Pinnell
- Born: March 31, 1877; Cuba, Missouri
- Died: May 22, 1966 (aged 89); Jacksonville, Florida
- Occupation: Lawyer

Louise Rebecca Pinnell (March 31, 1877 – May 22, 1966) was the first female lawyer in Florida.

She was born on March 31, 1877, in Cuba, Missouri, to Ethan Allan and Frances Collier Pinnell. Her father Ethan was an attorney who was admitted to the Missouri Bar Association in 1873 and eventually became a probate judge. Pinnell received her early education in Crawford County, Missouri, before attending Steelville College. During the 1890s, the entire family moved to Bronson, Levy County, Florida.

Pinnell was an autodidact, as there were no law schools in Florida before 1900. She thus received her legal tutelage from her father, and five months after completing her oral examination, became the first female to be admitted to the Florida State Bar in October 1898. Pinnell initially practiced law with her father before joining the law practice of Major St. Clair-Abrams, Esq. in Jacksonville, Florida, who specialized in railroad litigation. In 1920, Pinnell began working as an attorney for the Florida East Coast Railway Company in St. Augustine, Florida. She remained at the company for approximately twenty-five years.

Pinnell died on May 22, 1966, in Jacksonville, Florida.

== See also ==
- List of first women lawyers and judges in Florida
