= Conference of State Court Administrators =

American court conference

- Founded: 1955
- Type: Charitable organization
- Purpose: Law
- Location: National Center for State Courts, 300 Newport Avenue, Williamsburg, VA 23185, United States
- Coordinates: 37.266179°N 76.704568°W
- Region served: United States
- Key people: Shelley Rockwell
- Website: cosca.ncsc.dni.us

The Conference of State Court Administrators (COSCA), which was established in 1955 and incorporated in 1982, consists of the state court administrators and equivalent officials in each of the states and territories of the United States. Its mission is to provide a national forum to assist state court administrators.
