= Circuit court (Florida) =

State court in Florida, United States

The Florida circuit courts are state courts and trial courts of original jurisdiction for most controversies. In Florida, the circuit courts are one of four types of courts created by the Florida Constitution (the other three being the Florida Supreme Court, Florida district courts of appeal, and Florida county courts).

The circuit courts primarily handle felony criminal cases; family law matters; civil cases where the amount in controversy is greater than $50,000; probate, guardianship, and mental health cases; juvenile dependency and delinquency cases; and appeals of decisions in certain administrative, noncriminal infractions, and other types of cases.

== Circuits ==
Map of the judicial circuits

There are 20 judicial circuits in Florida, all but five of which span multiple counties. They are:

1. First Circuit – Escambia, Okaloosa, Santa Rosa, and Walton
2. Second Circuit – Franklin, Gadsden, Jefferson, Leon, Liberty, and Wakulla
3. Third Circuit – Columbia, Dixie, Hamilton, Lafayette, Madison, Suwannee, and Taylor
4. Fourth Circuit – Clay, Duval, and Nassau
5. Fifth Circuit – Citrus, Hernando, Lake, Marion, and Sumter
6. Sixth Circuit – Pasco and Pinellas
7. Seventh Circuit – Flagler, Putnam, St. Johns, and Volusia
8. Eighth Circuit – Alachua, Baker, Bradford, Gilchrist, Levy, and Union
9. Ninth Circuit – Orange and Osceola
10. Tenth Circuit – Hardee, Highlands, and Polk
11. Eleventh Circuit – Miami-Dade
12. Twelfth Circuit – DeSoto, Manatee, and Sarasota
13. Thirteenth Circuit – Hillsborough
14. Fourteenth Circuit – Bay, Calhoun, Gulf, Holmes, Jackson, and Washington
15. Fifteenth Circuit – Palm Beach
16. Sixteenth Circuit – Monroe
17. Seventeenth Circuit – Broward
18. Eighteenth Circuit – Brevard and Seminole
19. Nineteenth Circuit – Indian River, Martin, Okeechobee, and St. Lucie
20. Twentieth Circuit – Charlotte, Collier, Glades, Hendry, and Lee

== Jurisdiction ==
Florida circuit courts have original jurisdiction not vested in the county courts, direct review of administrative action, and the power to issue writs of mandamus, quo warranto, certiorari, prohibition, and habeas corpus, as well as any other writs necessary to exercise their jurisdiction.

As authorized by the legislature, and in addition to the power to issue various injunctions and other necessary orders, the circuit courts more specifically have the following jurisdiction:

=== Original jurisdiction ===
Original jurisdiction is as follows:

- In all actions at law not cognizable by the county courts;
- Of proceedings relating to the settlement of the estates of decedents and minors, the granting of letters testamentary, guardianship, involuntary hospitalization, the determination of incompetency, and other jurisdiction usually pertaining to courts of probate;
- In all cases in equity including all cases relating to juveniles except traffic offenses as provided in chapters 316 and 985;
- Of all felonies and of all misdemeanors arising out of the same circumstances as a felony which is also charged;
- In all cases involving legality of any tax assessment or toll or denial of refund, except as provided in s. 72.011;
- In actions of ejectment; and
- In all actions involving the title and boundaries of real property.

=== Appellate jurisdiction ===
Appellate jurisdiction is as follows:

- Appeals from final administrative orders of local government code enforcement boards and of reviews and appeals as otherwise expressly provided by law.

== Florida's Business and Commercial Court Tracks ==
Four of Florida's Circuit Court's have issued orders creating specialized complex business and commercial court programs, including the Ninth Judicial Circuit (Orange and Osceola Counties) Business Court, the Eleventh Judicial Circuit (Miami-Dade County) Complex Business Litigation Division, the Thirteenth Judicial Circuit (Hillsborough County) Business Court, and the Seventeenth Judicial Circuit (Broward County) Complex Litigation Unit consisting of a business and tort subdivision.

In 2004, Ninth Circuit chief judge Belvin Perry made Judge Renee A. Roche Florida's first specialized business court judge. Judge Roche, along with Florida judge John E. Jordan (Ninth Judicial Circuit), have served as business court representatives to the American Bar Association's Business Law Section. A specialized business court in Orlando (Orange County) was first suggested by Thomas Benton Smith (judge). In 2023, the Ninth Circuit business court expanded from Orange County to add Osceola County.

Judge Gill S. Freeman was the first judge presiding over Miami's Complex Business Litigation Section, serving in that role for five years. She is co-chair of the Florida Bar Association's Business Law Section Business Courts Task Force, which was formed in 2018 to study the merits of implementing a statewide business court. In early 2020, on the precipice of the COVID pandemic, the task force recommended a proposed statewide business court.

Judge Richard A. Nielsen was the first presiding judge in the Thirteenth Circuit's Complex Business Litigation Division in Tampa, in 2007, where he served for 5 years.

In 2008, Seventeenth Judicial Circuit (Broward County) chief judge Victor Tobin issued an administrative order creating a Complex Litigation Unit with subdivisions for complex tort cases and complex business court cases. Judge Robert Rosenberg, who had suggested the idea of a specialized business court in the Seventeenth Circuit was appointed as one of the initial complex business case judges, with Judge Charles Greene to handle complex tort cases and Judge Jeffrey Streitfeld to handle complex tort and business cases.

In 2017, the Eleventh Judicial Circuit Court in Miami-Dade County Florida created a separate International Commercial Arbitration Court. As of May 2024, Judge Lisa S. Walsh serves as both a Complex Business Litigation Division Judge and a presiding International Commercial Arbitration Court Judge. Judge Jennifer D. Bailey also served both as a Complex Business Litigation Division judge and International Commercial Arbitration judge in the Eleventh circuit, among her many contributions to that court.

== Election ==
Circuit court judges are elected by the voters of the circuits in nonpartisan, contested elections against other persons who choose to qualify as candidates for the position. Circuit court judges serve for six-year terms, and they are subject to the same disciplinary standards and procedures as Supreme Court Justices and district court judges.

== See also ==
- Judiciary of Florida
