= Lisa S. Walsh =

American judge

Judge, Eleventh Judicial Circuit Court, Miami-Dade County, Florida (originally appointed and later elected)
- Incumbent
- Assumed office 2011
- Appointed by: Governor Rick Scott
- Preceded by: Robert Pineiro

Judge, Miami-Dade County Court (originally appointed and later elected)
- In office 2008–2011
- Appointed by: Governor Charlie Crist

Personal details
- Education: Northwestern University (B.S. 1988); University of Miami School of Law (J.D. 1992)

Lisa Sharon Walsh is an American judge, serving on the Eleventh Judicial Circuit Court in Miami-Dade County, Florida since 2011. She has been Administrative Judge of that court's Appellate Division, a judge of its International Commercial Arbitration Court since 2017, and a business court judge in its Complex Business Litigation Division since 2023. She has received numerous awards as a judge, has held significant leadership positions, and has provided judicial education programming to other judges. In 2024, Walsh was the highest rated judge (among 49) in the Miami-Dade Bar's Judicial Poll.

== Judicial service ==
In 2008, Governor Charlie Christ appointed Walsh as a judge of the Miami-Dade County Court's civil division, a position to which she was later elected. The civil division is a court of limited jurisdiction where the claims are under $50,000. A Florida county's Circuit Court is a court of general jurisdiction that hears civil actions worth more than $50,000. In 2011, Governor Rick Scott appointed Walsh to Florida's Eleventh Judicial Circuit Court in Miami-Dade County, to fill a vacancy left by the death of Judge Robert Pineiro. In subsequent election cycles, Walsh either won election to the circuit court or was unopposed at the time of the general election. In originally appointing Walsh, Scott "hailed her 'common-sense approach' to every issue and dispute, in which she 'applied the rule of law in a consistent, fair and intelligent manner'”.

Walsh has served in the Circuit Court's criminal, civil, and dependency divisions. In 2017, the International Commercial Arbitration Court (ICA) was created within the Eleventh Judicial Circuit Court's civil division. Walsh was appointed as one of the first two judges to sit in the ICA, where she continues serving as a judge (as of July 2024), having been "specially trained in the laws and procedures that are unique to international arbitration". In early 2023, Walsh was assigned to the Eleventh Circuit's Complex Business Litigation Division, a specialized business court program created in 2006, with a jurisdiction limited to complex cases of a business and commercial nature.

Walsh has also served as Administrative Judge of the Miami-Dade Circuit Court's Appellate Division, and has been appointed by designation to sit as an appellate judge on Florida's Fourth District Court of Appeal. The Circuit Court's appellate division handles appeals from decisions of the county court, various quasi-judicial boards, and administrative agencies. Florida's District Courts of Appeal hear appeals from decisions in the Circuit Courts.

Since 2009, she has been involved as part of the faculty and administration of Florida's Advanced Judicial College, the Florida Judicial College, and the Florida Conference of Circuit Judges. Walsh was president of the National Association of Women Judges for the 2015 to 2016 term.

== Legal practice prior to being a judge ==
Walsh worked in the Office of the Public Defender of the Eleventh Judicial Circuit of Florida from 1992 to 2004, and in private legal practice from 2004 to 2008. She served as a special master for the City of Miami Beach.

== Education ==
Walsh received her Bachelor of Science in speech degree from Northwestern University in 1988, and her Juris Doctor degree from the University of Miami School of Law in 1992.

== Awards and honors ==
Walsh has received the following awards and honors, among others;

- Rated the most exceptional judge in the Miami-Dade Bar's Judicial Poll (2024)
- National Association of Women Judges' Norma Wikler Award for Excellence in Service (2020)
- Community Service Award from the Greater Miami Jewish Federation (2019)
- Outstanding Woman in Government & Law award from the Miami-Dade Commission for Women (2019)
- The Florida Bar Young Lawyer's Division Outstanding Jurist Award (2018)
- The Miami Dade Trial Lawyers Association Judge Steven Levine Award, given for fairness, integrity, and professionalism (2018)
- The Justice Vaino Spencer Leadership Award from the National Association of Women Judges (2018)
- The Dade County Bar Association President's Award as Outstanding Community Leader (2017)
- The Devorah Judge Award from the Miami Jewish Legal Society (2017)
- The Mattie Belle Davis Award from the Miami-Dade Florida Association of Women Lawyers (2015) ("This award is presented annually to an MDFAWL member and jurist who exemplifies the ideals of professional achievement, perseverance, and dedication that were demonstrated by the late Judge Davis")
- The Alumni Leadership Award from the University of Miami Law School (2015)
- The Miami-Dade Bar Association's Judge Alan Schwartz Judicial Excellence Award (2010)

== Positions and memberships ==
Walsh has held the following positions, among others;

- President, National Association of Women Judges (2015 to 2016)
- President, Miami-Dade Florida Association for Women Lawyers (2017)
- An International Director of the National Association of Women Judges
- Co-chair, National Association of Women Judges Global Judicial Leadership Conference at Columbia University in New York (June 2019)
- Member, board of directors for Legal Services of Greater Miami
- Member, Florida Bar Criminal Executive Council and the Appellate Rules Committee
- Mentor, Educate Tomorrow and Big Brothers/Big Sisters
