= Gill S. Freeman =

American judge

Judge, Eleventh Judicial Circuit of Florida, Miami-Dade County
- In office 1997–2016

Personal details
- Born: 1949 (age 76–77) New York
- Education: Temple University (B.S. Ed., cum laude 1970); University of Miami (M.Ed. 1973); University of Miami School of Law (J.D., cum laude, 1977)

Gill S. Freeman is a retired American judge who served for nearly 20 years in the Circuit Court of Miami-Dade County, Florida. She is the recipient of numerous awards as a judge, and has held a wide range of significant leadership positions, in addition to serving as a judge. She was the first judge assigned to Miami's newly established business court in 2007, and co-chairs a bar association task force on making recommendations about implementing business courts statewide in Florida.

== Judicial service ==
Freeman was first appointed as a judge to the Eleventh Judicial Circuit in Miami-Dade County in 1997, was later elected in 2004, and then was successful in a 2010 retention election for an additional six-year term.

Among other judicial assignments, she served in the Family Law Division, as well as serving judicial rotations in the criminal and general civil divisions. In 2007, Freeman was the first judge assigned to preside over the Eleventh Circuit's newly created Complex Business Litigation Section, a business court track with a specialized jurisdiction limited to complex business and commercial cases. Freeman served in that role for five years. She retired from the court in 2016.

While a judge, she served as dean of the Florida College of Advanced Judicial Studies, a judicial education program within the Florida Court Education Council (FCEC). The dean's responsibilities include, among other things, administrative oversight, setting policies and goals, curriculum assessment, faculty recruitment and determining faculty qualifications, program planning and instructional material developments, and faculty and staff support. The dean is also responsible to report to the FCEC and Florida Supreme Court. The dean is selected based upon experience as a judge; experience presenting judicial education; interpersonal and group communication skills; demonstrated leadership, inspiration, and supervision qualities; and accessibility and collegiality toward people in every facet of the program. Freeman was a Florida Supreme Court appointee to the FCEC as well.

== Legal practice and work after judicial retirement ==
Freeman was in private legal practice for 20 years, in commercial and family law, before becoming a judge in 1997. She worked at the private South Florida law firms of Walton, Lantaff, Schroeder & Carson from 1977 to 1981 and Ruden, McClosky, Smith, Schuster & Russell from 1981 to 1997.

After retiring as a judge, Freeman has joined JAMS, a private provider of alternative dispute resolution services.

In connection with her experience as a business court judge, she is co-chair of the Florida Bar Business Law Section's Business Courts Task Force, studying the merits of implementing a statewide business court in Florida. In early 2020, the task force recommended a proposed statewide business court, shortly before the COVID-19 pandemic became widely publicized and widespread.

== Work prior to law school ==
Freeman was a teacher in the Dade County Public School System from 1970 to 1976.

== Education ==
Freeman received a Bachelor of Science in Education, cum laude, from Temple University in 1970, a Masters of Education degree in guidance and counseling from the University of Miami in 1973, and a Juris Doctor degree, cum laude, from the University of Miami School of Law in 1977.

== Awards and honors ==
In June 2024, Freeman received the Miami-Dade Bar's David W. Dyer Professionalism Award. This is "the most prestigious distinction awarded by the Miami Dade Bar. The award is given to a lawyer or judge whose conduct reflects and honors the integrity, humility, compassion, and professionalism displayed by Judge Dyer throughout his entire career". In 2008, the Florida Association of Women Lawyers' (FAWL) presented Freeman with the Rosemary Barkett Award. The award is given in honor of Justice Barkett, who was Florida's first woman Supreme Court justice and Chief Justice. Among other things, it recognizes outstanding achievement charting new territory in the legal profession, overcoming traditional stereotypes of women in the perception by others and in self-perception, and advancing women's status in Florida.

Freeman has also received the following awards and honors, among others;

- Miami Jurisprudence Award from the Anti-Defamation League of Florida (2022)
- Florida Bar's Young Lawyers Section's Meenu T. Sasser Outstanding Jurist Award (2016)
- Dade County FAWL Mattie Belle Davis Award (1991). "This award is presented annually to an MDFAWL member and jurist who exemplifies the ideals of professional achievement, perseverance, and dedication that were demonstrated by the late Judge Davis".
- Dade County's In the Company of Women Award
- The Cuban American Bar Association recognized her for her dedication and service to the Eleventh Circuit Court's Complex Litigation Division
- The Jewish Federation of Greater Miami's Community Service Award
- Sabadell Bank's Community Service Award in conjunction with the Dade County Bar Association

== Positions and memberships ==
Freeman has held the following positions, among others;

- President. Florida Association of Women Lawyers
- Chair, Florida Supreme Court Standing Committee on Diversity and Fairness
- Co-chair. Florida Bar Business Law Section's Business Courts Task Force
- Vice chair, Florida Supreme Court Gender Bias Commission and chair of the Gender Bias Study Implementation Commission
- Dean, Florida College of Advanced Judicial Studies
- Appointed by Supreme Court of Florida to the Florida Court Education Council
- Chair, Board of Trustees of the Miami Dade County Law Library (2006 to 2016)
- Chair, Board of Directors of Spectrum Programs, a longstanding organization providing drug and alcohol rehabilitation services in Dade and Broward Counties
- Founding chair, Journey Institute, which provides counseling services to child sexual abuse victims
