= Conference of Chief Justices =

American professional association

The Conference of Chief Justices (CCJ) is an association of top jurists in the United States. It was created in 1949 after the need for an organization composed of the states' and territories' top jurists was amply discussed at the American Bar Association and other juridical organizations. The first meeting, organized by the Council of State Governments and funded by private foundations, and held in St. Louis, Missouri, was held at the behest of New Jersey Chief Justice Arthur T. Vanderbilt, Nebraska Chief Justice Robert G. Simmons and Missouri Chief Justice Laurance M. Hyde, who was elected as the first chairman by the representatives of the 44 states in attendance. Thirty-two states were represented by their Chief Justices and 12 by Associate Justices empowered by their Chiefs. Four of the 48 states were not represented.

At the present time, the CCJ includes all 50 states, the District of Columbia and the nation's five territories, the United States Virgin Islands, Puerto Rico, Guam, American Samoa and the Northern Marianas Islands. It is headed by a board composed of its four officers, the immediate past president, five elected members and one member designated by the president-elect.

While the Council of State Governments served as CCJ's secretariat for many years, since 1976 that role is carried out by the National Center for State Courts. CCJ's president, however, continues serving as a member of CSG's Governing Board.

The Conference has studied and issued policy statements on matters pertaining to the state judiciary, including habeas corpus, federal funding for state courts, the State Justice Institute, judicial immunity, court backlogs, cameras in the courtroom and child support enforcement.

== Sources ==
- http://ccj.ncsc.dni.us
- https://ccj.ncsc.org
