= Renee A. Roche =

American judge

Judge, Ninth Judicial Circuit Court, Florida, Orange and Osceola Counties
- In office 1997–2023
- Appointed by: Governor Lawton Chiles (appointed in 1997 and then won elections in 1998, 2004, 2010 and 2016)
- Preceded by: Gary Formet

Judge, Orange County Court (1995-1997)

Personal details
- Education: Auburn University (B.A. 1980); University of Florida Levin College of Law (J.D. 1984)

Renee A. Roche is a retired American judge who served for over 25 years in Florida's Ninth Judicial Circuit Court, encompassing Orange and Osceola Counties. She was Florida's first specialized business court judge, setting an example for the development of other business courts outside of the Ninth Circuit. She served in four of the Ninth Circuit's judicial divisions, and was a leader as an administrative judge and associate administrative judge in the criminal and civil divisions.

== Judicial service ==
In 1997, Florida Governor Lawton Chiles appointed Roche as a judge to the Ninth Judicial Circuit Court, which encompasses Orange and Osceola Counties, to replace the late Judge Gary Formet. Roche later was elected as a Circuit Court judge in 1998, and reelected in 2004, 2010, and 2016. Florida's circuit courts are trial level courts with broad jurisdiction to hear criminal cases involving felonies, civil disputes valued at over $50,000, family/domestic law matters, juvenile justice matters, and probate, guardianship and mental health matters. During her service as a Circuit Court judge, Roche handled cases in the criminal, civil, juvenile, and family/domestic divisions, and was an associate administrative judge and administrative judge in the civil and criminal divisions. On occasion, she had been appointed temporarily as the circuit's chief judge. Roche retired in January 2023.

In 2003, Ninth Circuit Chief Judge Belvin Perry issued an administrative order creating a trial level specialized business court division within the Ninth Circuit, effective January 2004. The Ninth Circuit Business Court's specialized jurisdiction focuses on complex business, corporate, and commercial cases, where one judge handles the case from beginning to end. Business courts had been considered in other circuits, but this was Florida's first business court program.

Perry appointed Roche as the initial Business Court judge, making her the first specialized business court judge in Florida. Within one month, Roche had already taken on 200 cases, and within two years she had taken on 1,200 cases, 70% of which had closed. As the Business Court judge, she pursued an active and disciplined approach to case management. She required opposing lawyers in the case to meet early and prepare an extensive case planning report together, though she would set the actual schedule of deadlines which the parties had to meet. At her judicial case management conferences, she required parties as well as lawyers to attend. She used a refined motion practice to make that process more thorough and efficient. She also encouraged parties to consider alternative dispute resolution, such as arbitration or mediation. Lawyers with Business Court cases described Roche as having a "no nonsense" approach that required their being prepared, and that she herself was always thoroughly prepared and rendered thoughtful and timely decisions. The Business Court also was cutting edge in using electronic filing of documents, and having a high-tech courtroom.

The Ninth Circuit Business Court's success led judges and lawyers in other Florida circuits to consider similar business court programs in their own jurisdictions. The Eleventh Judicial Circuit Court in Miami-Dade County and the Thirteenth Judicial Circuit Court in Hillsborough County (Tampa) created business court programs of their own in 2006 and 2007 respectively. Prior to creating these business courts, those two circuits "sent teams to scout out Roche's high-tech courtroom."

In 2006, the Florida Supreme Court made Roche a member of its Task Force on Management of Cases Involving Complex Litigation. Nationally, Roche served as a Business Court Representative to the American Bar Association's Business Law Section. Roche served on the Executive Committee of the team that organized the first meeting of the American College of Business Court Judges in 2005, co-sponsored by Brookings Institution and the American Enterprise Institute.

Roche was first appointed as a judge in 1995 to serve on the Orange County Court, a court of limited jurisdiction, where she handled traffic cases.

== Legal practice ==
Before becoming a judge, Roche was in the private practice of law for 11 years at the Florida law firm of Dean, Mead, Egerton, Bloodworth, Capouano & Bozarth. While still an attorney, she authored Beyond the Corporate Veil – The Potential Liability of Officers and Agents.

== Education ==
Roche received her Bachelor of Arts degree from Auburn University in 1980, and her Juris Doctor degree from the University of Florida College of Law (now known as the University of Florida Fredric G. Levin College of Law) in 1984.

== Positions and honors ==
Among others, Roche has held the following position and received the following honors;

- Administrative judge, criminal division, Ninth Judicial Circuit Court, Florida
- Associate administrative judge, civil division, Ninth Judicial Circuit Court, Florida
- Award from The Florida Bar's Business Law Section and the Orange County Bar Association’s Business Law Committee in recognition for Roche's substantial contributions to the Orange County Business Court
- Member, Florida Supreme Court Task Force on Management of Cases Involving Complex Litigation
- The Osceola County Bar Association rated Roche as the top judge in 1998
- Business Court Representative to the American Bar Association's Business Law Section
- Executive Planning Committee, and member, American College of Business Court Judges
