= County court (Florida) =

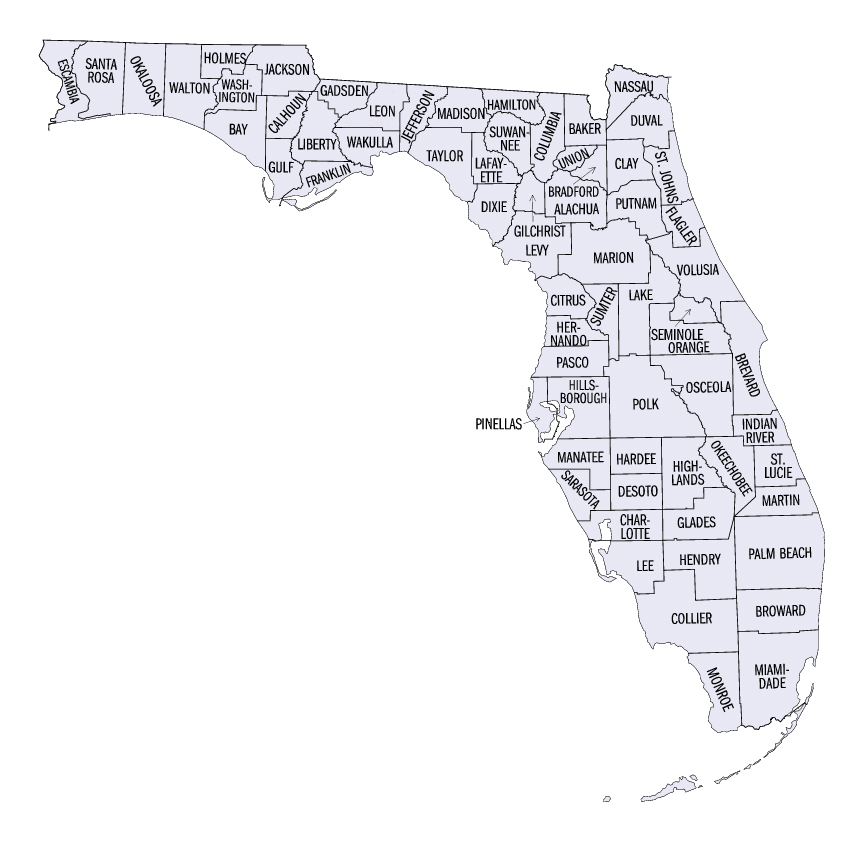
Map of the counties of the State of Florida, each of which has one county court.

The county courts are the state of Florida's trial courts, and are courts of limited jurisdiction where minor criminal (misdemeanor) and civil cases are heard. There is a county court in each of Florida's 67 counties.

== Jurisdiction, appeals, and judges ==
County courts have jurisdiction:

- In all misdemeanor cases not cognizable by the circuit courts;
- Of all violations of municipal and county ordinances;
- Of all actions at law, except those within the exclusive jurisdiction of the circuit courts, in which the matter in controversy does not exceed, exclusive of interest, costs, and attorney fees, ... the sum of $50,000;
- Of disputes occurring in the homeowners’ associations as described in s. 720.311(2)(a), which shall be concurrent with jurisdiction of the circuit courts; and
- Of small claims cases (less than $8,000).

County court decisions may be appealed to the Florida District Courts of Appeal, as set forth in Florida Rule of Appellate Procedure 9.030.

To be eligible to be a county court judge, a person must be a member of the Florida Bar, and in counties with a population of 40,000 or more, to have been so for five years.

== History ==
Florida has a two-tier trial court system of circuit and county courts that was established in 1972, as Article V of the Florida Constitution was adopted.

In November 2024, the Florida Supreme Court suspended Seminole County Circuit Court judge Wayne Culver for 60 days without pay, ruling that he acted like a “playground bully” in court, cursing defendants (for example: "I asked you a f—ing question, a–hole”), holding or threatening to hold several people in contempt of court, and denying their rights. He received a public reprimand in addition to his suspension.
