= National Center for State Courts =

Nonprofit organization in Williamsburg, United States

- Abbreviation: NCSC
- Founded: 1971
- Type: Nonprofit organization
- Purpose: Law, justice
- Headquarters: Williamsburg, Virginia
- Coordinates: 37.266179°N 76.704568°W
- President: Elizabeth T. Clement
- Key people: Warren E. Burger
- Revenue: $55,178,370 (2020)
- Expenses: $54,667,208 (2020)
- Website: www.ncsc.org

The National Center for State Courts (NCSC) is an independent, non-profit organization focused on improving the administration of justice in the United States and around the world. Its efforts are directed by a 27-member board of directors and through the collaborative work with the Conference of Chief Justices, the Conference of State Court Administrators, and other associations of judicial leaders. NCSC was founded in 1971 at the urging of U.S. Supreme Court Chief Justice Warren E. Burger. It is based in Williamsburg, Virginia.

== Mission ==
The National Center for State Courts drives innovation and progress in courts and justice systems by bringing together a community of individuals, leaders, ideas, experiences, knowledge, and perspectives to move courts and communities forward.

== History and founding ==
In March 1971, Chief Justice of the United States, Warren E. Burger, called for the creation of a central resource for the state and local courts at the First National Conference of the Judiciary, in Williamsburg, Virginia. During the conference, which was attended by U.S. President Richard M. Nixon, U.S. Attorney General John N. Mitchell, and over 400 members of the legal community, Chief Justice Burger said, "The time has come, and I submit that it is here and now at this Conference, to make the initial decision and bring into being some kind of national clearinghouse or center to serve all the states and to cooperate with all agencies seeking to improve justice at every level." President Nixon supported the creation of this "national clearinghouse or center" during his keynote address by saying, "today I am endorsing the concept of a suggestion...Chief Justice Burger will make...the establishment of a National Center for State Courts." After President Nixon and Chief Justice Burger spoke in favor of a judicial center for state courts, the conference adopted a resolution endorsing the creation of the National Center for State Courts (NCSC). The First National Conference on the Judiciary was featured on the front page of The New York Times. The conference attracted legal luminaries from across the country. The event was chaired by former U.S. Supreme Court Justice Tom C. Clark. In inflation-adjusted dollars, the event cost nearly $1 million, which was paid for by a grant from the U.S. Law Enforcement Assistance Administration (LEAA). The organization began operations in the headquarters building of the Federal Judicial Center in Washington, D.C. later in 1971.

In 1973, a special Board of Directors meeting was called to select a permanent site for NCSC's headquarters offices. The Board indicated preferences for Philadelphia, Pennsylvania, Denver, Colorado, or Williamsburg, Virginia. The final ballots were case between Denver and Williamsburg. Williamsburg received eight of the 12 secret ballots. A motion was carried by voice vote to designate Williamsburg as the permanent location of the headquarters for the National Center for State Courts (NCSC). Justice Paul C. Reardon of Massachusetts acknowledged the crucial factors in favor of Williamsburg were the availability of valuable land at nominal rent, $1 million pledge of support by Virginia Governor A. Linwood Holton, access to facilities of the respected William and Mary Law School at the College of William and Mary, and the proximity of a county courthouse. In effect, the location of NCSC in Williamsburg was to create a judicial administration complex featuring a national research organization, a law school and a working court. In his memoir, Governor Holton wrote, "I recognized that the new National Center for State Courts would be both a valuable economic and intellectual asset, and I was determined to have it located in Virginia ."

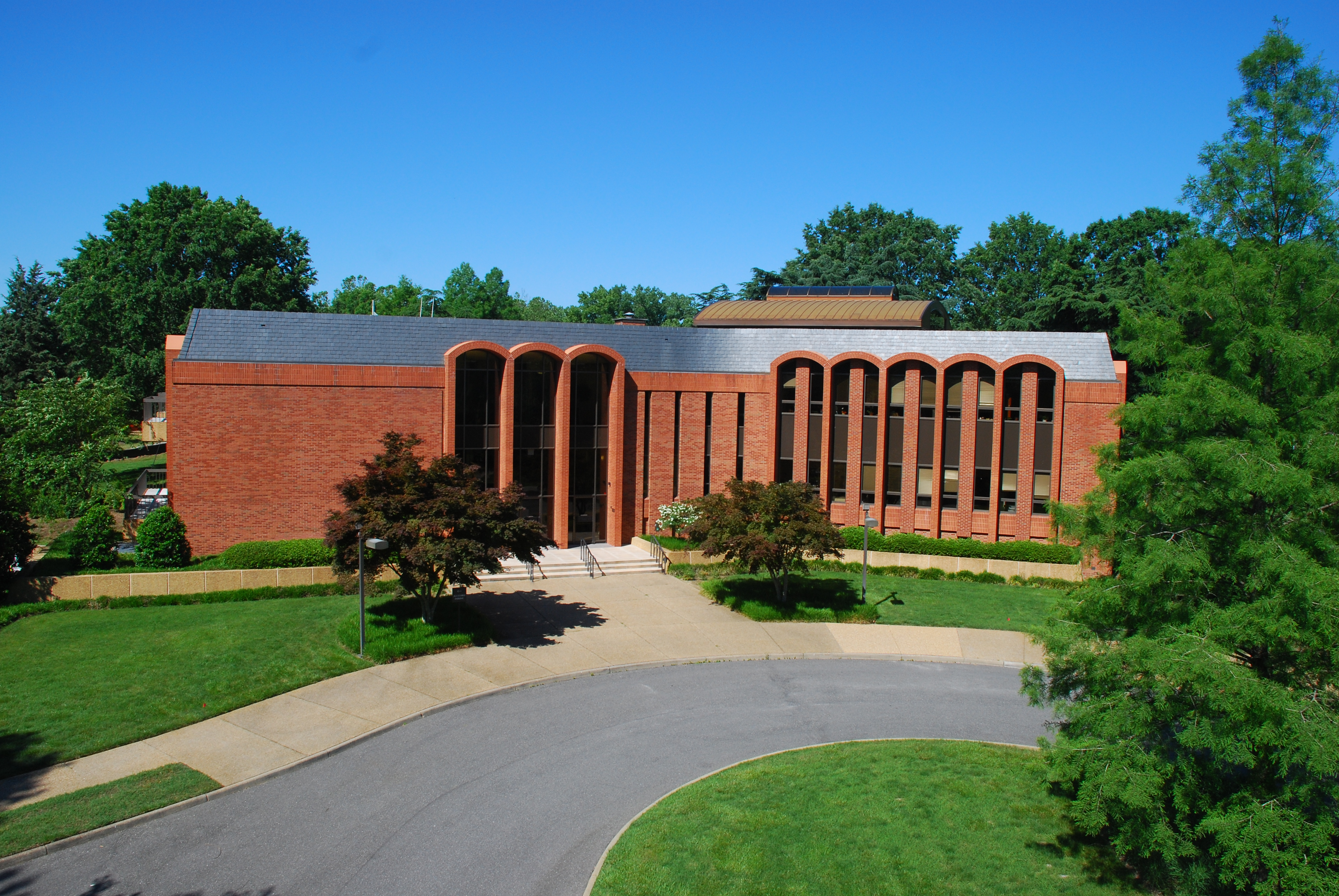
The headquarters building for the National Center for State Courts (NCSC), located in Williamsburg, Virginia.

The groundbreaking ceremony for NCSC's headquarters was held of May 8, 1976. The construction and interior decoration were completed on schedule and on budget, and staff of several departments began to move into the new building during the week of January 16, 1978. NCSC's new address at 300 Newport Ave. Williamsburg, Virginia 23185 became effective January 23, 1978. Today, NCSC still occupies this space in Williamsburg and has offices in Arlington, Virginia, Denver, Colorado and Washington, D.C.

In 1984, the Institute for Court Management (ICM) merged with NCSC, consolidating resources dedicated to the administration of state courts. ICM operates the professional development program for court administrators and is known for its Fellows Program.

== Programs and services ==
Initially, the National Center for State Courts (NCSC) concentrated on helping state courts to reduce backlogs and delay. Over the years, NCSC's programs and services have grown to include an array of additional services to improve the administration of justice.

- Knowledge management and library - NCSC serves as the information hub for the state court community. NCSC staff act as researchers and consultants, answering questions for court managers, maintaining and distributing relevant information, and analyzing trends and best practices in court operations. NCSC also manages one of the world's largest library of materials in court administration. The online catalog houses approximately 40,000 items in both print and digital format, including both internally and externally published materials. The library also serves as the official repository of all materials produced with the support of the State Justice Institute. NCSC produces a number of print and digital publications and hosts webinars to share its information and research with state courts. Information shared is for the purpose of helping courts plan, make decisions, and implement improvements that save time and money, while ensuring judicial administration that supports fair and impartial decision-making.
- Consulting and research services - NCSC provides technical assistance and consulting services to all levels of courts nationwide. Projects can include short reviews and assessment of administrative policies and procedures, long-term studies and evaluations with policy recommendations, and direct assistance in setting up or modifying programs and services. Areas of expertise include: access to justice, rural justice, racial justice, cybersecurity, caseflow management, problem-solving courts, courthouse planning and more. On average, NCSC is actively engaged in more than 350 research and consulting project each year.
- Education - Through its Institute for Court Management (ICM), NCSC boasts a significant record for training and educating judicial branch personnel in the growing body of knowledge on court leadership and management concepts, case management, human resources management, court performance standards, and other areas deemed critical to professional development. Since 2011, NCSC's ICM has offered three levels of certification: the Certified Court Manager (CCM) and the Certified Court Executive (CCE) credentials and the ICM Fellows Program. ICM has educated generations of court leaders about the foundational principles of court management and the most up-to-date evidence-based court management strategies and techniques.
- Conferences - With technology ever advancing, NCSC hosts two biannual events dedicated to legal technology, eCourts and the Court Technology Conference (CTC).
- International rule of law - In 1991, NCSC formed an international division to begin offering an array of research, consulting, education, and information services to strengthen the rules of law in countries around the world.
- Significant publications/series
  - Survey of Judicial Salaries (1974)
  - Court Statistics Project (1975) (produced jointly with the Conference of State Court Administrators)
  - Trial Court Performance Standards (1976)
  - Trends in State Courts (1988)
  - Harvard Executive Sessions (2008-2011)
  - Civil Justice Initiative (2016)

== Leadership and governance ==
The National Center for State Courts (NCSC) has had five presidents:

- Elizabeth T. Clement, 2025-present
- Mary Campbell McQueen, 2004-2025
- Judge Roger K. Warren, 1996-2004
- Larry Sipes, 199-1996
- Edward B. McConnel, 1973-1990

The organization is governed by a 27-member Board of Directors.

== 50th anniversary ==
In 2021, the National Center for State Courts commemorated its 50-year legacy of court improvement. On July 25, 2021, NCSC hosted a 50th anniversary event in Williamsburg. NCSC President Mary C. McQueen celebrated NCSC's accomplishments, while looking ahead toward the future. President McQueen and other court leaders ended the ceremony with a flag raising and dedicated of NCSC's Legacy Circle. Located in front of NCSC's Newport Avenue entrance, the circle features three flags - the flag of the United States; the Commonwealth of Virginia; and NCSC. The circle includes commemorative brick pavers that recognize the leadership of each state's court system and NCSC supporters. Each year, NCSC's Annual Report provides a broader understanding of the scope and relevance of the organization's work and commitment to improving the administration of justice and promoting the rule of law in state courts and around the world.
