= Interstate 90 in Pennsylvania =

Highway in Pennsylvania

Interstate 90
- AMVETS Memorial Highway
- I-90 highlighted in red

Route information
- Maintained by PennDOT
- Length: 46.297 mi (74.508 km)
- NHS: Entire route

Major junctions
- West end: I-90 at the Ohio state line near Conneaut, OH
- US 6N near West Springfield; I-79 near Erie; US 19 near Erie; PA 290 / PA 430 near Erie; I-86 near Erie; US 20 near State Line
- East end: I-90 Toll / New York Thruway at the New York state line near Ripley, NY

Location
- Country: United States
- State: Pennsylvania
- Counties: Erie

Highway system
- Interstate Highway System; Main; Auxiliary; Suffixed; Business; Future; Pennsylvania State Route System; Interstate; US; State; Scenic; Legislative
| ← PA 89 | → PA 90 |

Interstate 90 (I-90) within the US state of Pennsylvania spans 46.297 miles (74.508 km), all within Erie County, from the Ohio border near West Springfield to the New York border near North East. I-90 is the primary west–east highway in the Erie area, passing south of downtown and having interchanges with I-79, which connects Downtown Erie to southern Pennsylvania and beyond, and I-86, linking Erie to the Southern Tier of New York. U.S. Route 20 (US 20), which has an interchange with I-90 near the New York–Pennsylvania border, parallels I-90 across the county. Throughout its length, I-90 has also been designated as the AMVETS Memorial Highway, with signs posted at each state line.

== Route description ==
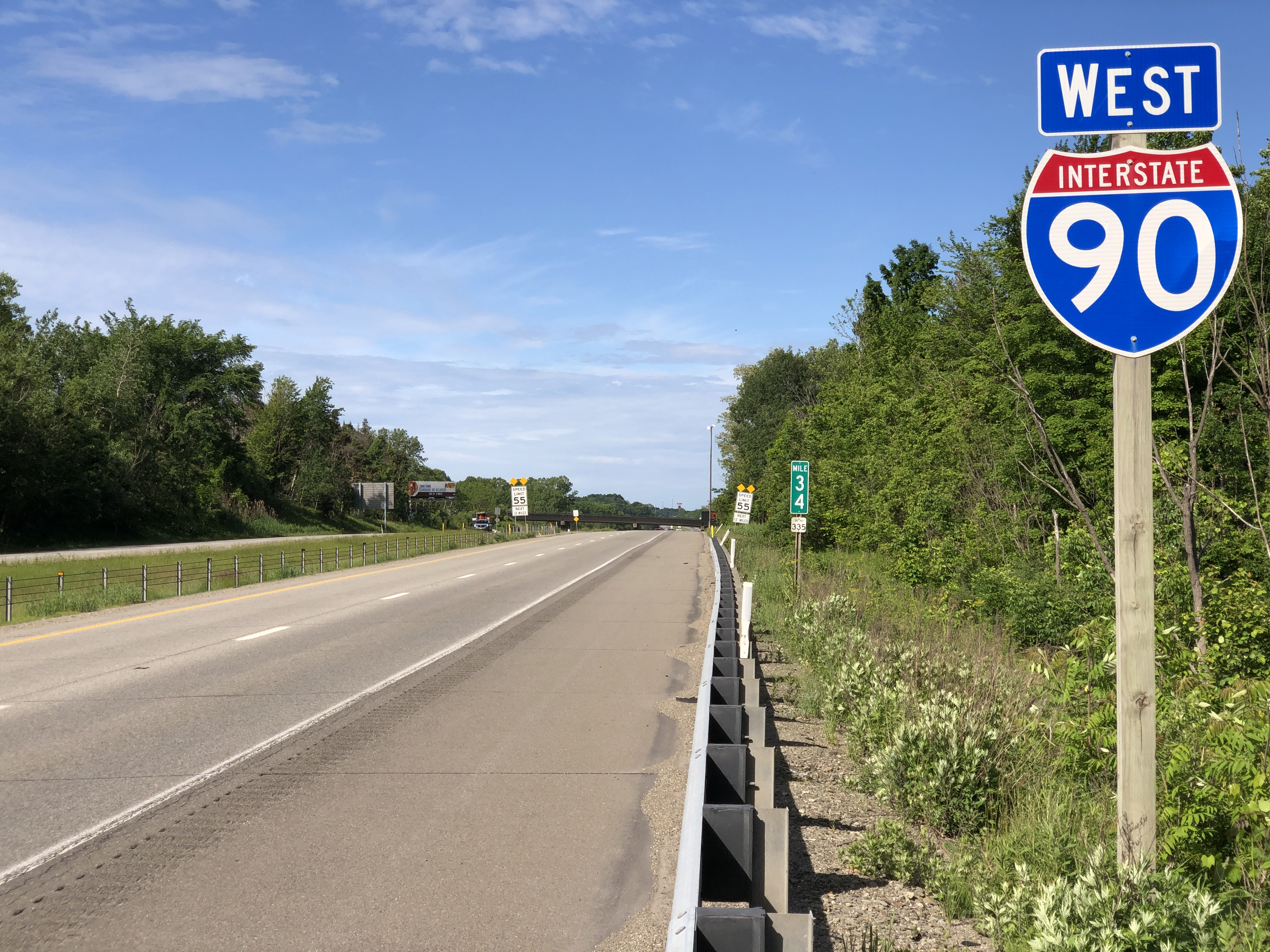
I-90 westbound past PA 531 in Harborcreek Township

I-90 enters Pennsylvania from Ohio in Springfield Township, Erie County, heading east as a four-lane freeway through rural areas of fields and woods. The road has an eastbound rest area before it reaches an interchange with US 6N near West Springfield. The next exit is for Pennsylvania Route 215 (PA 215) near East Springfield. The freeway enters Girard Township and curves to the northeast. I-90 passes through a corner of Platea before it crosses back into Girard Township and interchanges with PA 18. The roadway continues through more rural areas and crosses Elk Creek. The highway crosses into Fairview Township, where it has an exit for PA 98. I-90 curves more to the east and heads into McKean Township. Here, it has an interchange serving PA 832. The highway passes through more rural areas with some nearby development and reaches a cloverleaf interchange with I-79, which provides access to the city of Erie to the north.

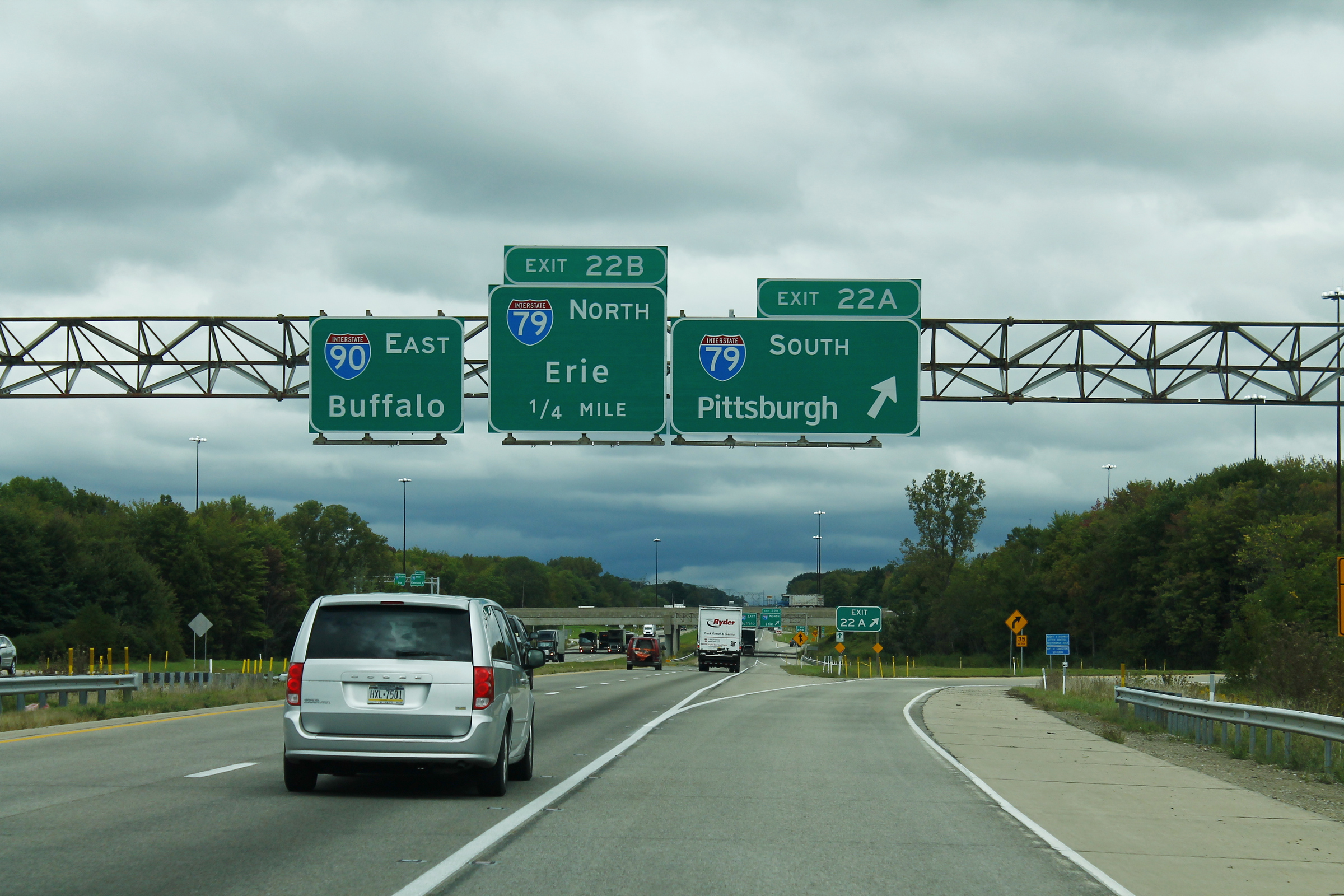
I-90 eastbound at the I-79 interchange in McKean Township

A short distance past I-79, the freeway enters Summit Township and heads northeast to an interchange with US 19 in a commercial area. I-90 runs through wooded areas with nearby suburban development and comes to the PA 97 interchange near Presque Isle Downs & Casino. The highway passes through a corner of Greene Township prior to entering Millcreek Township, where it has an exit for PA 8. The roadway briefly crosses back into Greene Township before it heads into Harborcreek Township. Here, I-90 has an interchange with PA 290/PA 430 that provides access to Penn State Erie, The Behrend College. The freeway heads back into rural areas of farms and woods, coming to the PA 531 exit. I-90 crosses into Greenfield Township, where it has a trumpet interchange with the western terminus of I-86. The roadway enters North East Township and continues through more rural land. The freeway reaches an interchange with PA 89, which provides access to the borough of North East to the north. Further northeast, the highway passes through agricultural areas and comes to an interchange serving US 20 near State Line. I-90 has a westbound welcome center before the route reaches the New York border, where it continues east into that state as part of the tolled New York State Thruway.

== History ==
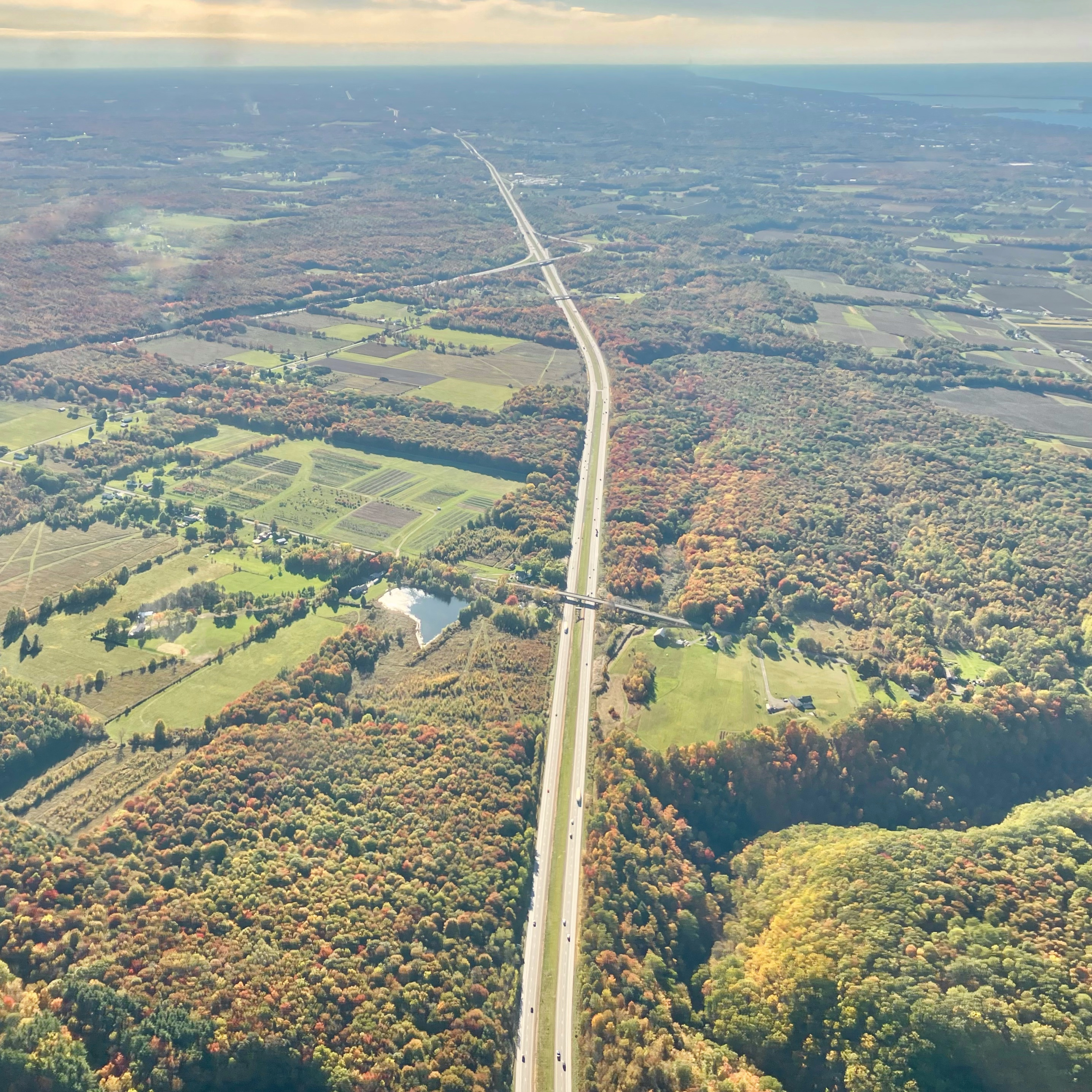
Intersection of I-90 and I-86 near Lake Erie

What is now I-90 was originally planned as part of the Pennsylvania Turnpike system in the 1950s. With the creation of the Interstate Highway System in 1956, this road was dropped from the turnpike system and would instead be built as a part of I-90. I-90 was completed through Pennsylvania on October 28, 1960. In 2007, a major pileup forced a 15-hour closure of the entire stretch of I-90 in Pennsylvania due to winter storm whiteout conditions.

== Exit list ==
The entire route is in Erie County.

| Location | mi | km | Old exit | New exit | Destinations | Notes |
|---|---|---|---|---|---|---|
| Springfield Township | 0.000 | 0.000 | | | I-90 west – Cleveland | Continuation into Ohio |
| Springfield Township | 3.034 | 4.883 | 1 | 3 | US 6N – West Springfield, Cherry Hill | |
| Springfield Township | 6.173 | 9.934 | 2 | 6 | PA 215 – East Springfield, Albion | |
| Girard Township | 9.613 | 15.471 | 3 | 9 | PA 18 – Girard, Platea | |
| Fairview Township | 15.586 | 25.083 | 4 | 16 | PA 98 – Fairview, Franklin Center | |
| McKean Township | 18.383 | 29.585 | 5 | 18 | PA 832 – Presque Isle, Sterrettania | |
| McKean Township | 21.913 | 35.266 | | 22 | I-79 – Pittsburgh, Erie | Signed as exits 22A (south) and 22B (north); exits 178A-B on I-79 |
| Summit Township | 24.365 | 39.212 | 6 | 24 | US 19 (Peach Street) – Waterford | Two lane entrance and exit ramps |
| Summit Township | 26.918 | 43.320 | 7 | 27 | PA 97 (State Street) – Waterford | |
| Millcreek Township | 29.322 | 47.189 | 8 | 29 | PA 8 (Parade Street) – Hammett | |
| Harborcreek Township | 32.149 | 51.739 | 9 | 32 | PA 290 / PA 430 (Bayfront Connector) – Wesleyville, Colt Station | Eastern terminus of PA 290 |
| Harborcreek Township | 34.622 | 55.719 | 10 | 35 | PA 531 – Harborcreek, Phillipsville | Westbound exit sign omits Phillipsville |
| Greenfield Township | 36.516 | 58.767 | 10A | 37 | I-86 east – Jamestown | Western terminus and exits 1A-B on I-86; former PA 17 |
| North East Township | 40.563 | 65.280 | 11 | 41 | PA 89 – North East | |
| North East Township | 44.670 | 71.889 | 12 | 45 | US 20 – State Line | |
| North East Township | 46.297 | 74.508 | | | I-90 east / New York Thruway east – Buffalo | Continuation into New York |
1.000 mi = 1.609 km; 1.000 km = 0.621 mi

== See also ==
Interstate 90
| Previous state: Ohio | Pennsylvania | Next state: New York |
