= Pennsylvania Route 98 =

State highway in Pennsylvania, US

Pennsylvania Route 98

Route information
- Maintained by PennDOT
- Length: 31.048 mi (49.967 km)

Major junctions
- South end: US 6 / US 19 / US 322 in Vernon Township
- US 6N in Elk Creek Township; I-90 near Fairview; US 20 in Fairview
- North end: PA 5 in Avonia

Location
- Country: United States
- State: Pennsylvania
- Counties: Crawford, Erie

Highway system
- Pennsylvania State Route System; Interstate; US; State; Scenic; Legislative
← PA 97	→ I-99

Pennsylvania Route 98 (PA 98) is a state highway located in western Pennsylvania. The southern terminus of the route is at U.S. Route 6 (US 6)/US 19/US 322 in Vernon Township. The northern terminus is at PA 5 in the borough of Avonia, one mile (1.6 km) from Lake Erie.

PA 98 also intersects Interstate 90 (I-90) and US 20 near Fairview.

== Route description ==
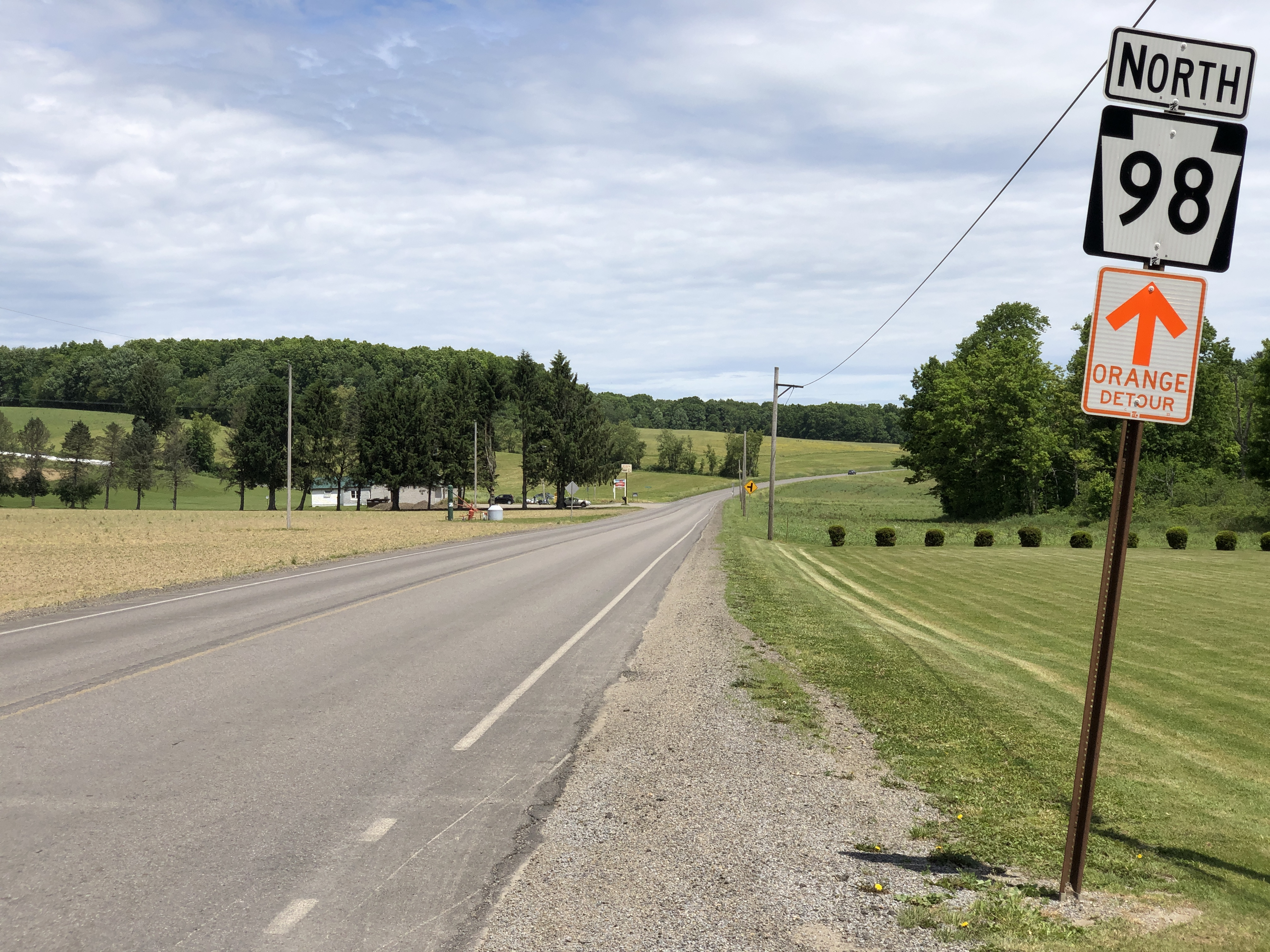
PA 98 northbound in Cussewago Township

PA 98 begins at an roundabout with US 6/US 19/US 322 in Vernon Township, Crawford County, with the road continuing south as part of US 19. From this intersection, the route heads north on two-lane undivided Perry Highway, passing rural areas of homes before heading through farmland and passing to the east of Port Meadville Airport. The road continues through wooded areas of homes, coming to an intersection with PA 102. At this point, PA 98 curves to the northwest and passes through a mix of farms and woods, crossing into Hayfield Township and turning to the north. The road runs through more wooded areas with some farm fields and residences, crossing PA 198 in Littles Corners. The route becomes unnamed and continues through more farmland and woodland with some homes, passing a short distance to the west of Cussewago Creek. PA 98 crosses into Cussewago Township and goes over Carr Run, a tributary to Cussewago Creek, running through more rural areas, eventually turning northeast and crossing Cussewago Creek before passing through Crossingville. The road makes a turn back to the north and passes through more woodland with some farms and homes.

PA 98 enters Elk Creek Township in Erie County and continues due north through agricultural areas with a few woods and homes, intersecting US 6N in Lavery. The road continues through more rural areas with some development, crossing into Franklin Township, where it passes through Franklin Center. The route passes through more open farmland before heading into more wooded areas, becoming Falls Road and heading into Fairview Township. PA 98 becomes Avonia Road and turns to the northwest, passing through a mix of farms and woods with some homes and crossing Elk Creek. The road heads north-northeast and comes to an intersection with the southern terminus of PA 832. Past here, the route runs through rural residential areas and turns northwest, coming to an interchange with I-90, at which point it is a divided highway. PA 98 becomes undivided again and passes through areas of woods and commercial development, heading into a mix of farmland and residential development. The road heads into the residential community of Fairview and crosses US 20 in a commercial area. The route heads through more rural areas of homes, crossing under Norfolk Southern's Lake Erie District railroad line and CSX's Erie West Subdivision railroad line within a short distance of each other. PA 98 comes to its northern terminus at an intersection with PA 5 in Avonia, with Avonia Road continuing north to Lake Erie.

== Major intersections ==
County	Location	mi	km	Destinations	Notes
Crawford	Vernon Township	0.000	0.000	US 6 / US 19 / US 322 (Conneaut Lake Road / Perry Highway) – Meadville, Conneaut Lake, Cleveland	Roundabout; southern terminus of PA 98
Crawford	Vernon Township	2.326	3.743	PA 102 south (Cussewago Road) – Meadville	Northern terminus of PA 102
Crawford	Hayfield Township	6.629	10.668	PA 198 to I-79 – Conneautville, Saegertown	
Erie	Elk Creek Township	18.805	30.264	US 6N – Albion, Edinboro	
Erie	Fairview Township	27.157	43.705	PA 832 north / SR 3018 (Sterrettania Road) – Girard, Sterrettania	Southern terminus of PA 832
Erie	Fairview Township	27.740– 27.829	44.643– 44.786	I-90 – Erie, Cleveland	Exit 16 (I-90)
Erie	Fairview Township	29.812	47.978	US 20 (Main Street)	
Erie	Fairview Township	31.048	49.967	PA 5 / LECT (West Lake Road) / Avonia Road	Northern terminus of PA 98
1.000 mi = 1.609 km; 1.000 km = 0.621 mi
