= Sterrettania, Pennsylvania =

Unincorporated community in Pennsylvania, US

- Unincorporated community
- Location within the state of Pennsylvania Sterrettania (the United States)
- Coordinates: 42°0′16″N 80°12′12″W
- Country: United States
- State: Pennsylvania
- County: Erie
- Townships: Fairview, McKean
- Elevation: 886 ft (270 m)
- Time zone: UTC-5 (Eastern (EST))
  - Summer (DST): UTC-4 (EDT)

Sterrettania is a populated place located in Erie County, Pennsylvania, United States. It is in Fairview and McKean townships, in the valley of Elk Creek, a short tributary of Lake Erie.

Sterrettania is an unincorporated community on Pennsylvania Route 832. Sterrettania is located 12 miles (19 km) southwest of downtown Erie and has an elevation of 886 feet (270 m). Sterrettania is not a census designated or incorporated place having an official federally recognized name. Sterrettania appears on the Swanville U.S. Geological Survey Map, is in the Eastern Time Zone (UTC -5 hours) and observes daylight saving time.

== Major intersection ==
West of Sterrettania, Pennsylvania Route 832 intersects with Pennsylvania Route 98.

== History ==
The place is named for Robert Sterrett, who first settled there in 1804. David S. Sterrett built a gristmill there in 1839, one of the largest in the county.
