= Erie Water Works =

Water company in Pennsylvania, United States

- Formerly: Erie Water and Gas Company
- Industry: Municipal Water Supply
- Founder: Borough of Erie
- Headquarters: Erie, Pennsylvania, United States
- Areas served: City of Erie, Lawrence Park Township, Wesleyville. Portions of Millcreek Township, Harborcreek Township, Summit Township and McKean Township and McKean Borough.
- Key people: Paul D. Vojtek CEO, CFO; John J. McCormick Jr Erie Water Works Board Chairman
- Products: Drinking water and fire hydrant water
- Number of employees: Approximately 100
- Website: eriewater.org

The Erie Water Works was incorporated in 1865 as the Erie Water and Gas Company to provide drinking water and fire hydrant water for the city of Erie, Pennsylvania. The Water Works, also known as the Erie City Water Authority, replaced the Erie Water Systems. Its board of commissioners operates independently of the city government.

== Origins ==
A simple pump log system (see 'bored logs') provided the first systematic water works for Erie beginning in 1840, tapping spring water on the Reed farm south of 18th Street and Parade Street. The city began inquiries towards a more substantial system beginning in 1853. A state law passed by the Commonwealth of Pennsylvania on 11 March 1857 on the formation and organization of gas and water companies was the basis for incorporation in 1865 and subsequent construction and provision of utility service.

== Infrastructure ==
Erie's city government decided on 16 July 1866 to seek a hydraulic engineer to oversee construction. The city engaged Henry P M Birkinbine, Esq, of Philadelphia, Pennsylvania, who reported his findings on 23 February 1867. A formal contract to provide fire safety water for twenty years—50 fire hydrants at $9,000 per year—was signed by the city government but never enforced.

The location of the water works at the foot of Chestnut Street was determined in November 1867.

The West Engine Company of Norristown, Pennsylvania was contracted in November 1867 to provide two Cornish Bull engines. A single engine pumped 2.5 million US gallons (9,500 m^{3}) per day, while 4.0 million US gallons (15,000 m^{3}) per day were pumped when the engines were doubled. The city contracted with the Holly Manufacturing Company of Lockport, New York in 1885 to provide a Gaskill Engine to provide 5 million US gallons (19,000 m^{3}) per day of water. That engine was installed in a new pump house on 11 June 1887.

The Erie City Iron Works was contracted in December 1867 to erect a 5-foot-wide (1.5 m) standpipe, which eventually reached a height of 233 feet (71 m), thought to have been the tallest standpipe in the world. John M Kuhn, Esq was hired in 1868 to build the standpipe tower, and Captain James Dunlap was contracted that year to construct the crib work. The foundation for the water works was excavated beginning on 7 April 1868.

The city government decided in 1870 that it needed a reservoir. Seven acres of land at the Cochran estate, south of 26th Street between Chestnut Street and Cherry Street, was acquired for that purpose in 1871. Work on the reservoir was completed in 1874.

The Chestnut Street Water Treatment Plant and Sommerheim Water Treatment Plant filter water received from Lake Erie and the Sommerheim Reservoir, which is spring fed. Sommerheim pumps 25 million US gallons (95,000 m^{3}) of water per day to homes and businesses in Erie and surrounding communities.

Erie Water Works is the second largest consumer of electricity in Erie after GE Transportation. As a result of a vulnerability assessment conducted by the Department of Homeland Security, the Sommerheim plant is to receive a new power generation facility to back up its Penelec electrical service. The facility, which will cost $1.2 million, is to consist of two diesel-powered electric generators with a day tank and a bulk storage fuel tank.

== Organization ==
As of 4 April 1867, three water commissioners were appointed by the judge of the Court of Common Pleas to serve staggered three-year terms: Henry Rawle, William Ward Reed (1 April 1824 - 10 January 1904) , and William Lawrence Scott.

The Water Works, also known as the Erie City Water Authority, took over the Erie Water Systems as of 1 January 1992. The Erie Times-News suggests that the Water Authority replaced the Water System in 1989.

== Politics ==
- The mayoral election of 1867 hinged on water issues, especially whether water should be collected from Presque Isle Bay or from local spring water.
- An effort to stop fluoridation of the water supply was debated in late 2001, but no referendum was added to the November 2001 ballot. Council members threatened to temporarily disband the Erie City Water Authority to remove its board members if they persisted in their plans to fluoridate the water.
- A $21 million development project is aimed at improving water quality at the Sommerheim treatment plant in three phases, with completion expected by early 2009. Filtration is currently handled with a sand and charcoal process, achieving turbidity levels of 0.1 - 0.2 NTU. Replacement of the current system is being weighed against installation of a new sophisticated membrane system at $5 million to $7 million additional cost, adjusting the total cost of the project to as much as $28 million. The membrane system would help the city anticipate new federal water treatment standards, lower pre-treatment costs, and achieve turbidity levels of 0.004 NTU, 125 times better than the state standard of 0.5 NTU.
- Plans have been laid for an extension of water service to the Borough of McKean, Pennsylvania
