= Pennsylvania Route 832 =

State highway in Erie County, Pennsylvania, US

Pennsylvania Route 832

Route information
- Maintained by PennDOT
- Length: 11.157 mi (17.955 km)
- Existed: 1928–present

Major junctions
- South end: PA 98 in Fairview Township
- I-90 in McKean Township; US 20 in Millcreek Township; PA 5 in Millcreek Township
- North end: Presque Isle State Park

Location
- Country: United States
- State: Pennsylvania
- Counties: Erie

Highway system
- Pennsylvania State Route System; Interstate; US; State; Scenic; Legislative
← PA 831	→ PA 833

Pennsylvania Route 832 (PA 832), known locally as Sterrettania Road and Peninsula Drive, is a state highway located in Erie County, Pennsylvania. Its northern terminus is at the entrance to Presque Isle State Park in Erie. The southern terminus is at PA 98, two miles (3 km) west of Sterrettania in Fairview Township. PA 832 has junctions with U.S. Route 20 (US 20), PA 5 and PA 5 Alternate (PA 5 Alt.). PA 832 is exit 18 off Interstate 90 (I-90). PA 832 was designated in 1928 between PA 99 (now PA 5 Alt.) and Presque Isle. The route was extended south to US 20 by 1940. PA 832 was further extended to I-90 by 1959 and PA 98 by 1970.

== Route description ==
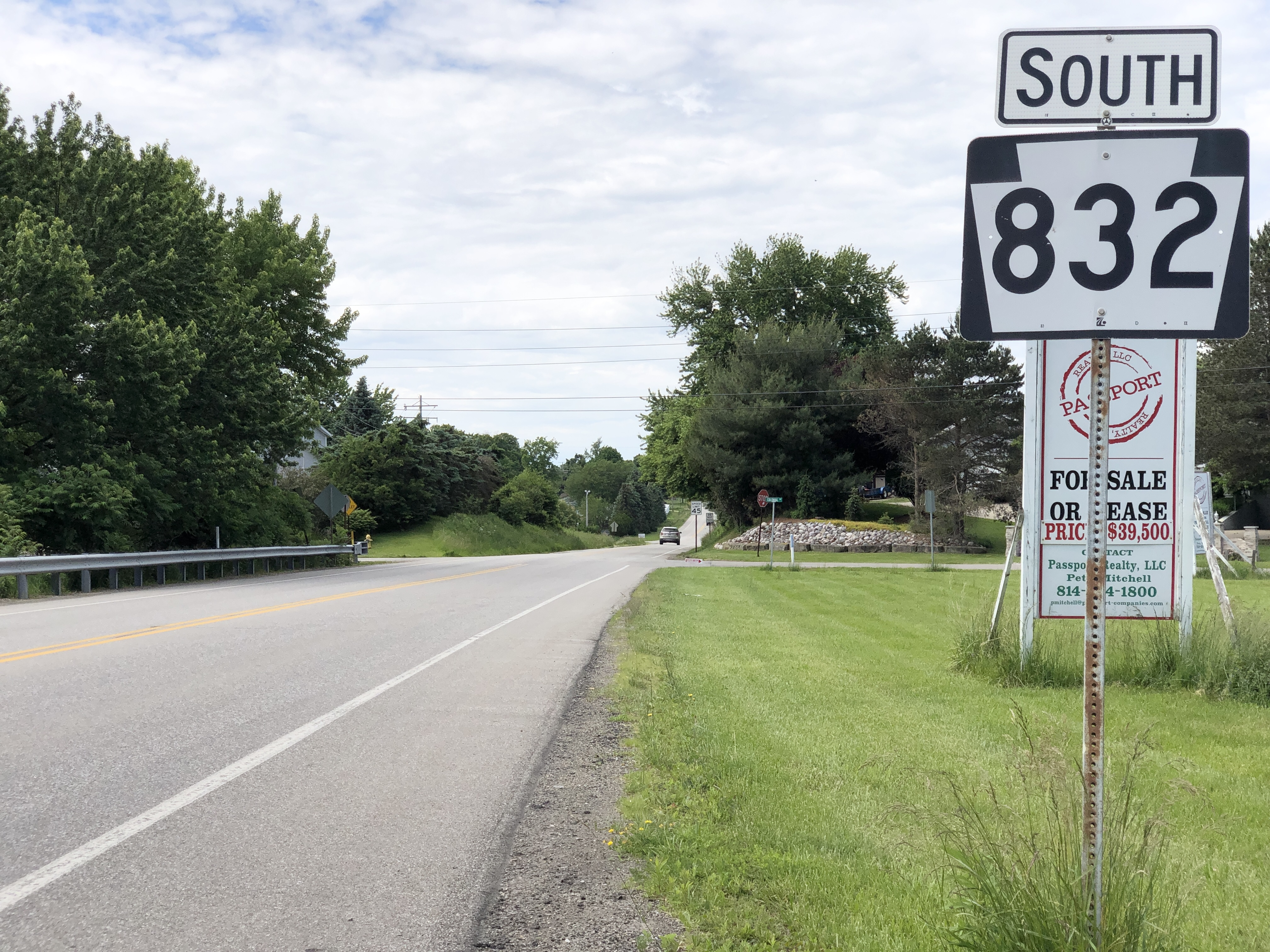
PA 832 southbound in Millcreek Township

PA 832 begins at an intersection with PA 98 south of I-90 exit 16 in Fairview Township. The route continues east as two-lane undivided Sterrettania Road through a mix of farmland and woodland with some homes, paralleling I-90. The route enters McKean Township and passes through Sterrettania before turning to the northeast and interchanging with I-90 at exit 18. PA 832 continues to the northeast, entering Millcreek Township, a western suburb of the city of Erie, from the southwest. Within Millcreek Township, PA 832 passes residential development and intersects West 38th Street and West 32nd Street, among other roadways, before intersecting US 20 (West 26th Street). At US 20, PA 832 switches names from Sterrettania Road to Peninsula Drive and turns to the northwest toward the Lake Erie shoreline.

North of US 20, PA 832 becomes a five-lane road with a center left-turn lane and crosses CSX Transportation's Erie West Subdivision and Norfolk Southern Railway's Lake Erie District via the Arthur F. Deitsch Memorial Bridge. The road runs through an industrial area prior to a junction with PA 5 (West 12th Street). The highway passes homes and businesses and crosses PA 5 Alt. (West 8th Street/West Lake Road) near the lakeshore. PA 832 continues north past Waldameer & Water World, where the Ravine Flyer II roller coaster crosses overtop the road, connecting the amusement park to a small hill to the east. Past this, the road reaches Presque Isle State Park, located on a peninsula protruding into Lake Erie north of the city. While Peninsula Road continues north onto the peninsula and into the park, the PA 832 designation terminates at the entrance to the park.

== History ==
When Pennsylvania first legislated routes in 1911, what is now PA 832 was not given a number. PA 832 was formed in 1928, stretching from PA 99 (now PA 5 Alt.) to Presque Isle. By 1940, the southern terminus of the route was at US 20 west of Erie. In 1959, PA 832 was extended from US 20 to the new I-90 (the Erie Throughway) in order to provide access to Erie and Presque Isle for motorists coming from the west and also to serve the western suburbs of Erie. By 1970, the southern terminus was moved to its current location at PA 98.

== Major intersections ==
The entire route is in Erie County.

Location	mi	km	Destinations	Notes
Fairview Township	0.000	0.000	PA 98 (Avonia Road) – Fairview, Lavery	Southern terminus of PA 832
McKean Township	3.135	5.045	I-90 – Erie, Cleveland	Exit 18 (I-90)
Millcreek Township	8.956	14.413	US 20 (West 26th Street)	
Millcreek Township	9.862	15.871	PA 5 (West 12th Street)	
Millcreek Township	10.181	16.385	PA 5 Alt. (West 8th Street) / LECT	
Millcreek Township	11.157	17.955	Peninsula Drive – Presque Isle State Park	Northern terminus of PA 832 at park entrance
1.000 mi = 1.609 km; 1.000 km = 0.621 mi
