= Sturgeon House =

Historic house in Pennsylvania, United States

- U.S. National Register of Historic Places
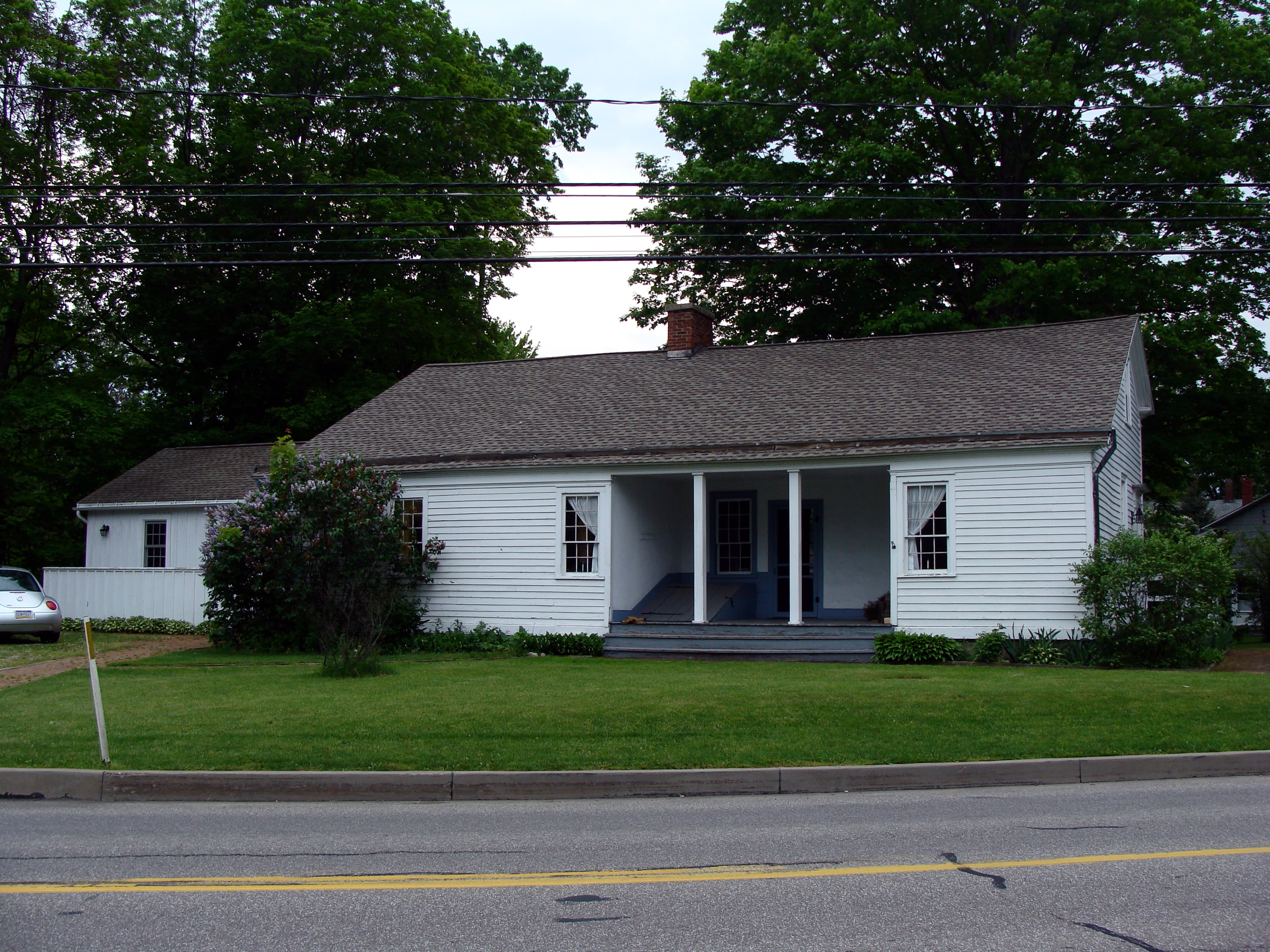

- Location within Pennsylvania
- Location: 4302 Avonia Road; Fairview, Pennsylvania
- Coordinates: 42°1′43″N 80°15′14″W
- Built: c. 1838
- Built by: Samuel C. Sturgeon
- Architectural style: Federal, Saltbox
- NRHP reference No.: 80003490
- Added to NRHP: December 10, 1980

The Sturgeon House is a saltbox house dating from around 1838 in Fairview, Erie County, in the U.S. state of Pennsylvania. It was listed on the National Register of Historic Places in 1980. The Sturgeon House is operated as museum by the Fairview Area Historical Society.

== Design ==
The Sturgeon House is located at the intersection of Water Street and Avonia Road (Pennsylvania Route 98). The house is a rare example of a saltbox house in northwestern Pennsylvania, as well as a house with a recessed side porch. The house is constructed of "stone foundation walls and topped with heavy timber sills which are notched to receive log form beams." The roof of the house is slanted at an angle of 30 degrees. The front door is framed by a cornice and Federal-style entablature and pilaster.

== History ==
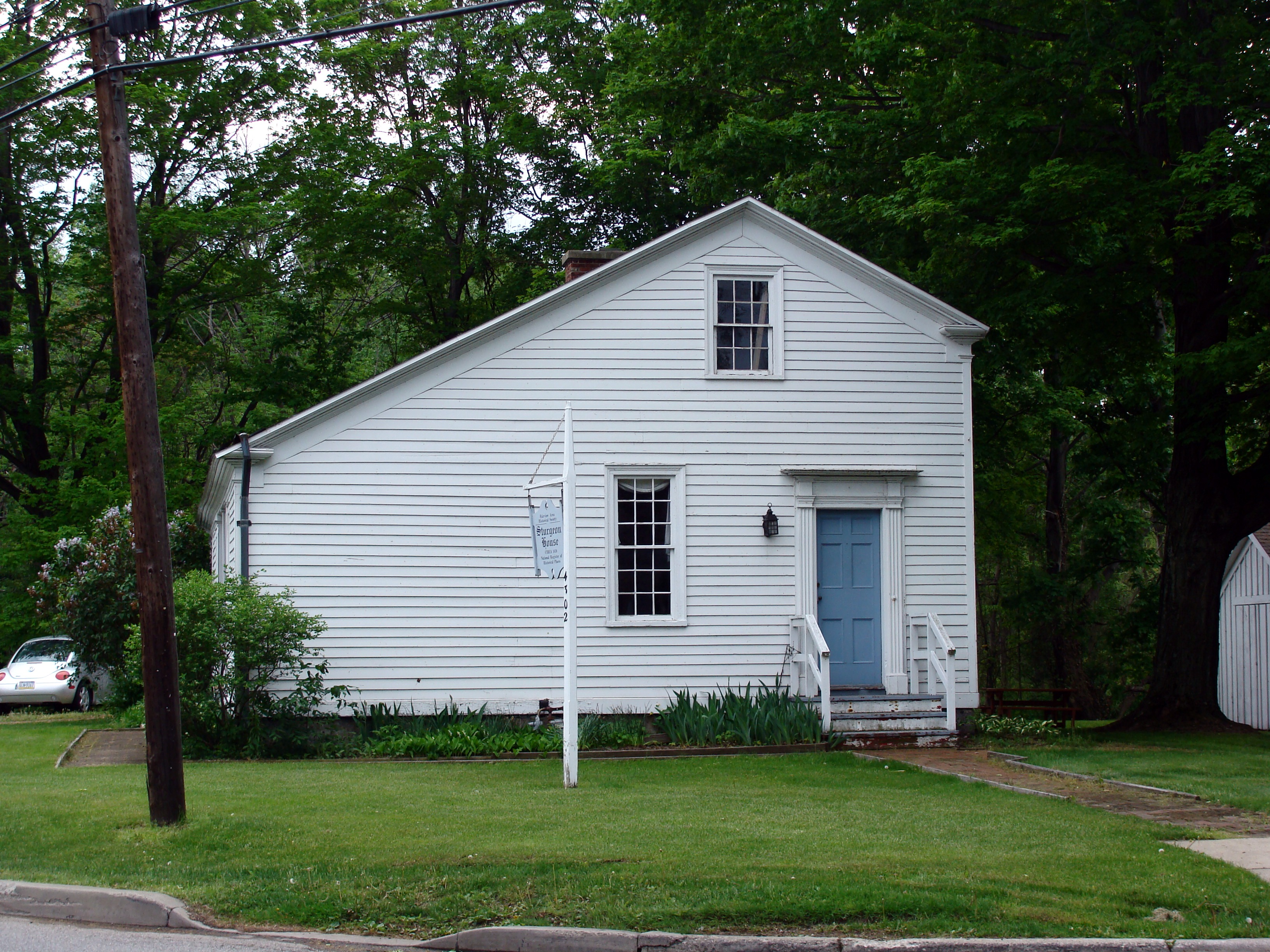
Front of the house showing the distinctive saltbox shape.

Jeremiah and William Sturgeon were the earliest settlers of what is now Fairview Township, who acquired land from the Pennsylvania Population Company in 1797. The Sturgeons operated "coach stops and taverns" in the area for travelers after the first road was cut from Erie to Cleveland, Ohio in 1805. They founded the community of Sturgeonville, which eventually became Fairview. The house was built around 1838 by Samuel C. Sturgeon and is one of several built by the Sturgeons. The southern addition of the house was possibly constructed in the early 1850s. The Sturgeon House was sold to the Fairview Area Historical Society in 1979 by a descendant of the Jeremiah Sturgeon. The house was listed on the National Register of Historic Places on December 10, 1980.

== See also ==
- List of museums in Pennsylvania
- National Register of Historic Places listings in Erie County, Pennsylvania

== Sources ==
- June E. Hetz (June 9, 1980). National Register of Historic Places Registration: Pennsylvania SP Sturgeon House. National Archives and Records Administration. (Downloading may be slow.)
