= Pennsylvania Route 5 =

State highway in Pennsylvania, US

Pennsylvania Route 5
- PA 5 highlighted in red, PA 5 Alternate in blue

Route information
- Maintained by PennDOT
- Length: 44.849 mi (72.177 km)
- Tourist routes: Great Lakes Seaway Trail; Lake Erie Circle Tour

Major junctions
- West end: US 20 in Springfield Township
- I-79 / PA 290 in Erie
- East end: NY 5 in North East Township

Location
- Country: United States
- State: Pennsylvania
- Counties: Erie

Highway system
- Pennsylvania State Route System; Interstate; US; State; Scenic; Legislative
← PA 4	→ US 6
← PA 394	PA 399	→ PA 401

Pennsylvania Route 5 (PA 5) is a westward continuation of New York State Route 5 (NY 5). Located in the Commonwealth of Pennsylvania, in the United States, it runs from North East, Pennsylvania at the New York-Pennsylvania border to Springfield Township in western Erie County, for a total of 44.85 miles (72.18 km).

This highway has been designated as the Purple Heart Highway but is most frequently referred to as Lake Road. The Seaway Trail runs along PA 5 for most of its course in Pennsylvania.

== Route description ==
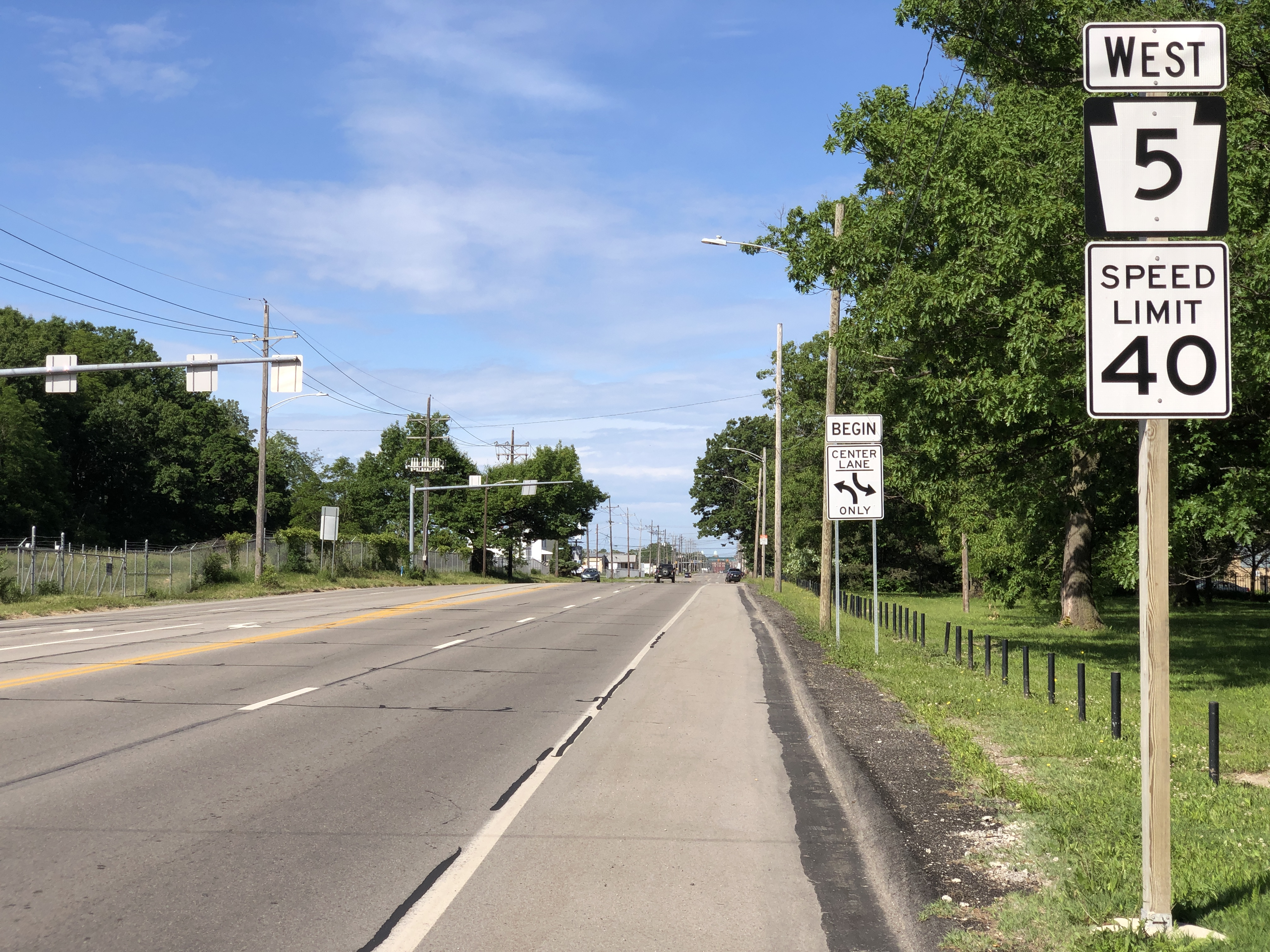
PA 5 westbound entering Erie

PA 5 begins at an intersection with U.S. Route 20 in Springfield Township 1.4 miles (2.3 km) east of the Ohio state line. The Seaway Trail, a scenic route runs along PA 5 for its entire routing in Pennsylvania except in Erie.

PA 5 begins as Lake Road heading towards the northeast paralleling Lake Erie through western Erie County. In the village of North Springfield, PA 5 intersects the northern terminus of Pennsylvania Route 215. As PA 5 enters Lake City, PA 5 is only 2,000 feet (610 m) south of Lake Erie. Then, PA 5 intersects the northern terminus of Pennsylvania Route 18, a road that crosses the entire state of Pennsylvania.

In Fairview Township, PA 5 intersects the northern terminus of Pennsylvania Route 98. In Millcreek Township, PA 5 intersects the western terminus of Pennsylvania Route 5 Alternate at a "Y" intersection with Asbury Road. PA 5 Alternate continues as Lake Road until it crosses Pennsylvania Route 832, which is labeled Peninsula Drive, at which point it proceeds as West 8th Street into the Erie city limits.

At Frontier Park, PA 5 Alternate turns ninety degrees north and bends its way around the park, becoming West 6th Street after crossing over the Bayfront Parkway. PA 5 Alternate passes around Gridley Park at Liberty Street and Perry Square at State Street. Between the two parks is a stretch of prominent homes known as Millionaires Row. PA 5 Alternate proceeds east to its terminus at Franklin Avenue, which marks the city limits and the resumption of PA 5.

PA 5 passes Erie International Airport in Millcreek Township as 12th Street. In Lakewood, PA 5 meets Powell Avenue 4,000 feet (1,200 m) west of the Erie city line, PA 5 meets Pennsylvania Route 832, which is labeled Peninsula Drive.

In the city of Erie, PA 5 interchanges the northern terminus of Interstate 79 at exit 183 and the western terminus of Pennsylvania Route 290. PA 290 begins concurrent with PA 5. PA 5 and PA 290 head towards the east into downtown Erie as 12th Street. As PA 5 goes through Erie, the Seaway Trail takes many turns around the city. In downtown Erie, PA 290 ends the concurrency with PA 5 when PA 290 heads towards the southeast as Bayfront Parkway.

Then, PA 5 makes a ninety-degree angle turn towards the north to become Franklin Avenue, then another ninety-degree turn towards the east to become Lake Road and meets the eastern terminus of PA 5 Alternate; the Seaway Trail now runs along PA 5 east of here.

In Lawrence Park Township, PA 5 meets the western terminus of Pennsylvania Route 955.

PA 5 continues towards the east paralleling Lake Erie, which can be seen from PA 5. In North East, PA 5 meets the northern terminus of Pennsylvania Route 89. PA 5 along with Seaway Trail continue towards the northeast as Lake Road. At the New York state line, PA 5 terminates (ends) and continues along with the Seaway Trail as New York State Route 5, ending in Albany.

== Major intersections ==
The entire route is in Erie County.

Location	mi	km	Destinations	Notes
Springfield Township	0.000	0.000	US 20 / LECT / Great Lakes Seaway Trail	Western terminus of PA 5
Springfield Township	4.748	7.641	PA 215 south	Northern terminus of PA 215
Lake City	9.597	15.445	PA 18 south (Lake Street)	Northern terminus of PA 18
Avonia	13.703	22.053	PA 98 south (Avonia Road) – Fairview	Northern terminus of PA 98
Erie	18.648	30.011	PA 5 Alt. east (West Lake Road) / LECT / Great Lakes Seaway Trail	Western terminus of Alternate PA 5
Erie	21.228	34.163	PA 832 (Sterretania Road) – Presque Isle State Park	
Erie	22.533	36.263	I-79 south / PA 290 begins – Pittsburgh	Western terminus of PA 290 and its concurrency with PA 5; exit 183 (I-79); northern terminus of I-79
Erie	26.076	41.965	PA 290 east (Bayfront Connector) to I-90	Eastern terminus of PA 290 concurrency
Lawrence Park Township	28.194	45.374	PA 5 Alt. west / LECT / Great Lakes Seaway Trail	Eastern terminus of Alternate PA 5
Lawrence Park Township	29.060	46.768	PA 955 east (Iroquois Avenue) – Harborcreek, North East	Western terminus of PA 955
North East Township	40.573	65.296	PA 89 south (Freeport Road)	Northern terminus of PA 89
North East Township	44.849	72.177	NY 5 east / LECT / Great Lakes Seaway Trail – Buffalo	Eastern terminus of PA 5 at New York state line
1.000 mi = 1.609 km; 1.000 km = 0.621 mi: Concurrency terminus

== PA 5 Alternate ==
Pennsylvania Route 5 Alternate
- Location: Erie County, Pennsylvania
- Existed: 1938–present
- Tourist routes: Lake Erie Circle Tour; Seaway Trail

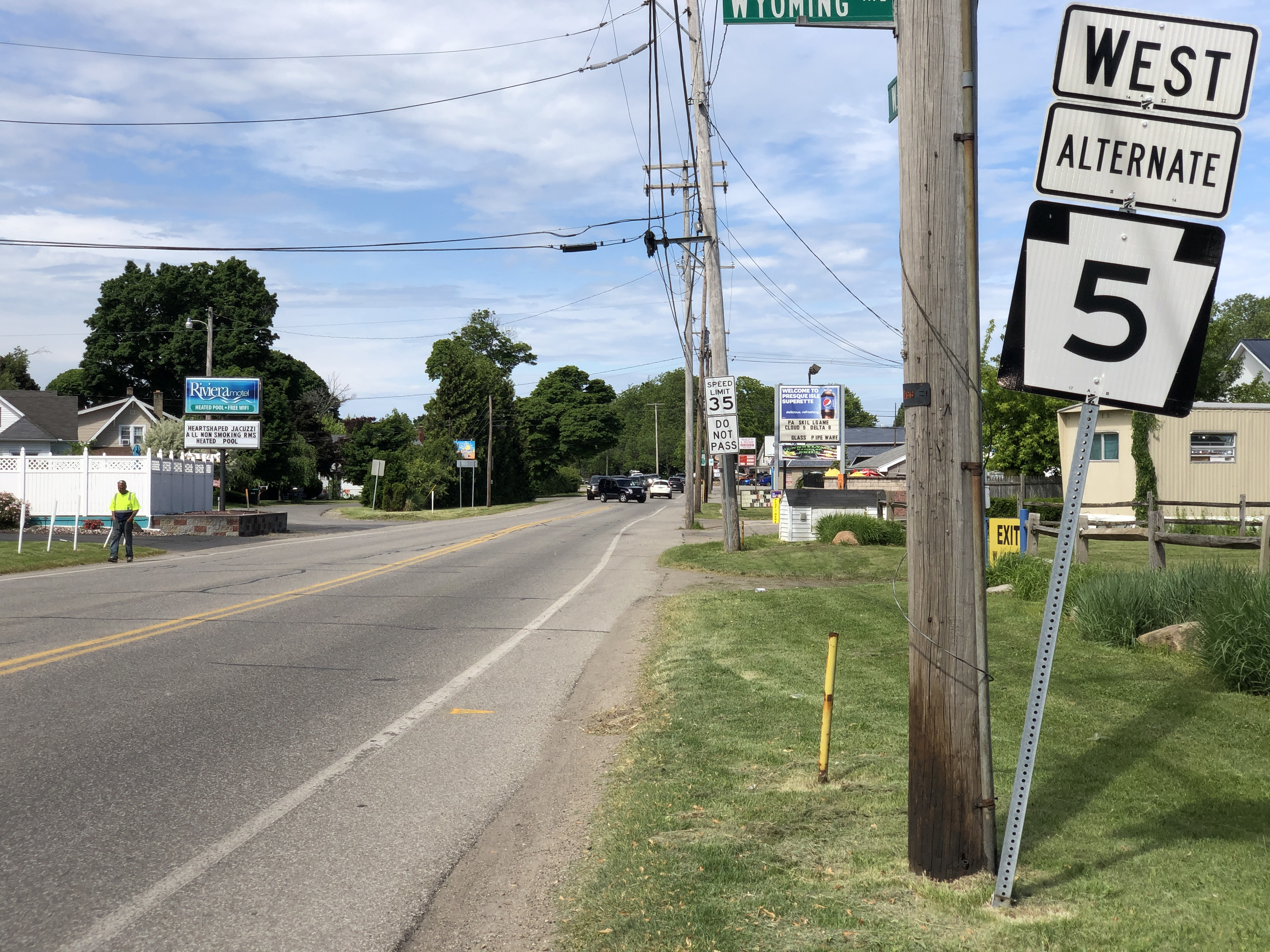
PA 5 Alt. westbound in Millcreek Township

Pennsylvania Route 5 Alternate is a 9-mile-long (14 km) alternate route that is located in Erie County in Pennsylvania. In 1955, the designations of mainline and alternate Routes 5 were switched. The route begins in suburban Millcreek Township, where its parent route passes near Erie International Airport.

It then passes through a heavily suburbanized and residential two-lane sector, before serving as portions of 8th and 6th Streets in Erie city. Passing relatively close to the lake, it travels through several picturesque tree-lined streets of large homes, skirting the city center and industrial areas. Near its eastern end, it is four lanes and divided, with a parkway-like setting formed by the tree-lined median.

Almost immediately after entering the suburb of Lawrence Park Township, the route ends at its parent.

The entire route is in Erie County.

Location	mi	km	Destinations	Notes
Millcreek Township	0.00	0.00	PA 5 (West 12th Street) / LECT / Great Lakes Seaway Trail	
Millcreek Township	2.78	4.47	PA 832 (Peninsula Drive) – Presque Isle State Park	
Lawrence Park Township	9.11	14.66	PA 5 (Franklin Avenue) / LECT / Great Lakes Seaway Trail	
1.000 mi = 1.609 km; 1.000 km = 0.621 mi
