= PA9 =

PA9, PA.9, PA-9, PA 9, or variant may refer to:

- Pennsylvania highway designations:
  - Pennsylvania Route 9 (1955–1996), now I-476
  - Pennsylvania Route 9 (1920s), now US Route 20
- Other uses:
- PA-9, Pennsylvania's 9th congressional district
- Dell PA-9, laptop power adapter
