= North Springfield, Pennsylvania =

Unincorporated community in Pennsylvania, US

- Unincorporated community
- Location within Pennsylvania
- Coordinates: 41°59′40″N 80°25′30″W
- Country: United States
- State: Pennsylvania
- County: Erie
- Elevation: 659 ft (201 m)
- Time zone: UTC-5 (Eastern (EST))
  - Summer (DST): UTC-4 (EDT)
- ZIP code: 16430
- Area code: 814
- GNIS feature ID: 1182638

North Springfield is an unincorporated community in Erie County, Pennsylvania, United States. The community is located along Pennsylvania Route 5, 20 miles (32 km) west-southwest of Erie. North Springfield has a post office with ZIP code 16430.
