= Pennsylvania Route 90 =

Pennsylvania Route 90 can refer to:

- Pennsylvania Route 90 (1920s-1960s), now numbered 191
- New Jersey Route 90, which becomes an unnumbered road in Pennsylvania
- Interstate 90 in Pennsylvania - the current route with the SR 90 designation.
- Pulaski Expressway - a planned expressway, which was supposed to have the PA 90 designation.
