= U.S. Route 20 in Pennsylvania =

Section of U.S. Highway in Pennsylvania

U.S. Route 20
- US 20 highlighted in red

Route information
- Maintained by PennDOT
- Length: 45.433 mi (73.117 km)
- Existed: 1926–present
- Tourist routes: Great Lakes Seaway Trail; Lake Erie Circle Tour

Major junctions
- West end: US 20 at the Ohio border near West Springfield
- US 6N near West Springfield; I-79 in Erie; US 19 in Erie; I-90 near North East
- East end: US 20 at the New York border near North East

Location
- Country: United States
- State: Pennsylvania
- Counties: Erie

Highway system
- United States Numbered Highway System; List; Special; Divided; Pennsylvania State Route System; Interstate; US; State; Scenic; Legislative
| ← US 19 | → PA 21 |
| ← PA 9 | → PA 10 |

U.S. Route 20 (US 20) is an east–west United States Numbered Highway in Pennsylvania, which clips the northwestern corner of the state, running entirely in Erie County. While it is part of the nation's longest road, it features the shortest segment of any two-digit U.S. Route in the commonwealth. Although bypassed by Interstate 90 (I-90) as the primary through route in the area, heavy traffic has led to nearly the entire highway being widened to four lanes in width.

== Route description ==
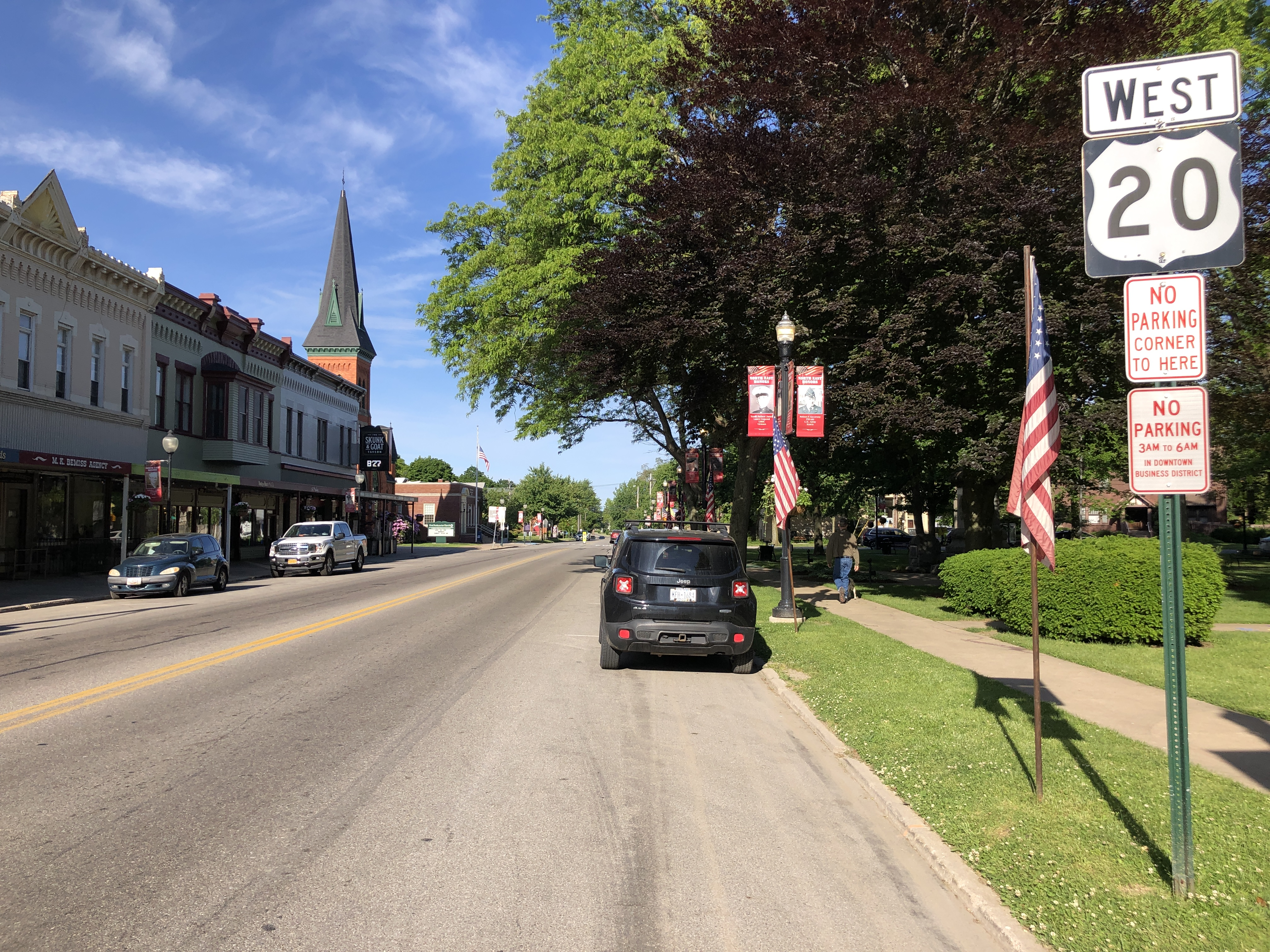
US 20 westbound past PA 89 in North East

US 20 travels for about 45 miles (72 km) through Pennsylvania's Great Lakes region. For most of its journey, it closely parallels a heavily traveled CSX Transportation rail line, which also serves Amtrak passenger trains. The highway enters the state under the moniker of West Ridge Road eastward from the Ohio border, as it journeys through Springfield Township, Girard Township, Fairview Township, and Millcreek Township. This section of road was widened to encompass a mostly four-lane setup after a pair of 1938 and 1946 infrastructural projects, owing to the heavy truck traffic between Erie and Cleveland, Ohio. A 1952 project saw the remainder of the Millcreek Township section of the route widened to four lanes.

At the intersection with Pennsylvania Route 832 (PA 832), just outside the Erie city limits, US 20 becomes West 26th Street. The highway then passes through an industrial and commercial corridor that represents a 1946 alignment change, which saw 26th Street extended to avoid the route's former complicated passage along East Avenue. Soon after a major interchange with Greengarden Boulevard, the highway becomes two lanes, as it passes through Erie's old residential neighborhoods. After the intersection with State Street just south of the city center, it becomes East 26th Street.

US 20 turns sharply northward as Broad Street at the Bayfront Connector, as it resumes four-lane status temporarily. It then turns east again as Buffalo Road through Wesleyville and Harborcreek Township. This portion of road was widened to four lanes during a 1958 overhaul. In North East Township, US 20 becomes West Main Road. Within the town limits of North East, it becomes West Main Street until it reaches the town center at its intersection with PA 89, where it becomes East Main Street. Outside the town limits, it becomes East Main Road until it reaches Pennsylvania's border with New York. The portion of road around North East was widened to four lanes in 1971.

== Major intersections ==
The entire route is in Erie County.

| Location | mi | km | Destinations | Notes |
|---|---|---|---|---|
| Springfield Township | 0.000 | 0.000 | US 20 west / LECT west (Main Road) – Cleveland | Continues into Ohio |
| Springfield Township | 1.479 | 2.380 | PA 5 east / LECT east (Lake Road) / Great Lakes Seaway Trail – North Springfield | Western terminus of PA 5 |
| Springfield Township | 2.876 | 4.628 | US 6N east to I-90 – Albion, Meadville, Warren | Western terminus of US 6N |
| Springfield Township | 6.224 | 10.017 | PA 215 to I-90 – North Springfield | |
| Girard Township | 10.351 | 16.658 | PA 18 south (Meadville Road) to I-90 | West end of PA 18 concurrency |
| Girard | 11.375 | 18.306 | PA 18 north (Rice Avenue) | East end of PA 18 concurrency |
| Fairview | 15.419 | 24.814 | PA 98 (Avonia Road) to I-90 | |
| Millcreek Township | 22.739 | 36.595 | PA 832 (Sterrettania Road/Peninsula Road) – Presque Isle State Park | |
| Erie | 23.655 | 38.069 | I-79 – Bayfront, Pittsburgh | Stack interchange |
| Erie | 26.381 | 42.456 | US 19 south (Peach Street) – Edinboro, Meadville, Pittsburgh | Northern terminus of US 19 |
| Erie | 26.459 | 42.582 | PA 505 south (State Street) to I-90 – Waterford, Union City | Northern terminus of PA 505 |
| Erie | 26.953 | 43.377 | PA 8 south (Parade Street) | Northern terminus of PA 8, 2 blocks north of PA 97 northern terminus |
| Erie | 28.333 | 45.598 | PA 290 (Bayfront Connector) | Interchange |
| Wesleyville | 30.325 | 48.803 | PA 430 east (Hannon Road) to I-90 | Western terminus of PA 430 |
| Harborcreek Township | 33.898 | 54.554 | PA 531 south (Depot Road) to I-90 | Northern terminus of PA 531 |
| Harborcreek Township | 34.131 | 54.929 | PA 955 west (Iroquois Avenue) | Eastern terminus of PA 955 |
| North East | 41.201 | 66.307 | PA 89 (Lake Street) to I-90 | |
| North East Township | 44.244– 44.269 | 71.204– 71.244 | I-90 – Erie, Buffalo | Partial cloverleaf interchange |
| North East Township | 45.433 | 73.117 | US 20 east (West Main Street) – Buffalo | Continues into New York |
1.000 mi = 1.609 km; 1.000 km = 0.621 mi

== See also ==
U.S. Route 20
| Previous state: Ohio | Pennsylvania | Next state: New York |
