= Pennsylvania Route 531 =

State highway in Erie County, Pennsylvania, US

Pennsylvania Route 531

Route information
- Maintained by PennDOT
- Length: 4.291 mi (6.906 km)
- Existed: 1962–present

Major junctions
- South end: PA 430 in Harborcreek Township
- I-90 in Harborcreek Township
- North end: US 20 in Harborcreek Township

Location
- Country: United States
- State: Pennsylvania
- Counties: Erie

Highway system
- Pennsylvania State Route System; Interstate; US; State; Scenic; Legislative
← PA 529	→ PA 532

Pennsylvania Route 531 (PA 531) is a state highway located entirely in Erie County, Pennsylvania. Its northern terminus is located at U.S. Route 20 (US 20) in Harborcreek Township. Its southern terminus is at Pennsylvania Route 430, also in Harborcreek Township.

== Route description ==
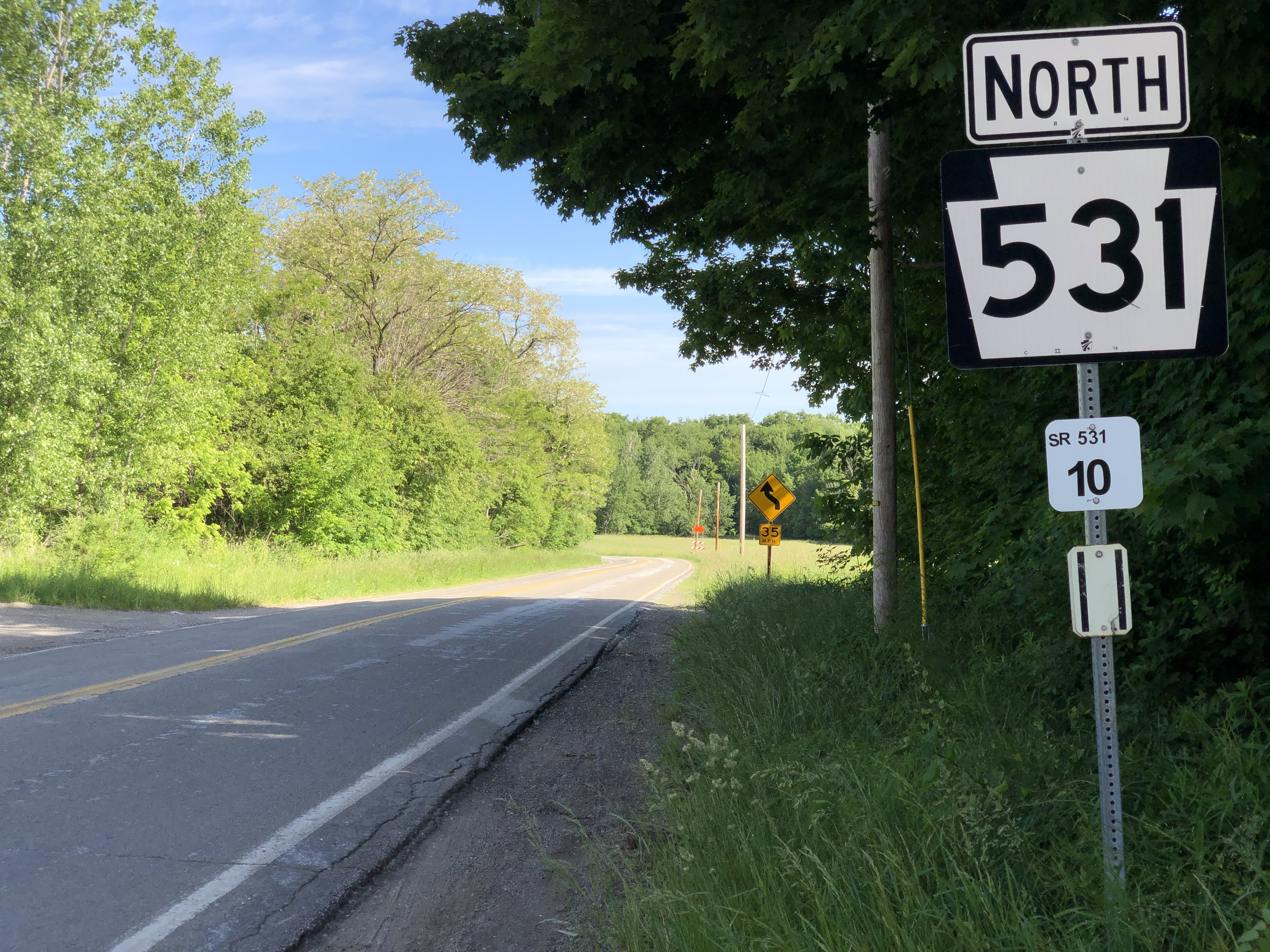
PA 531 northbound past PA 430 in Harborcreek Township

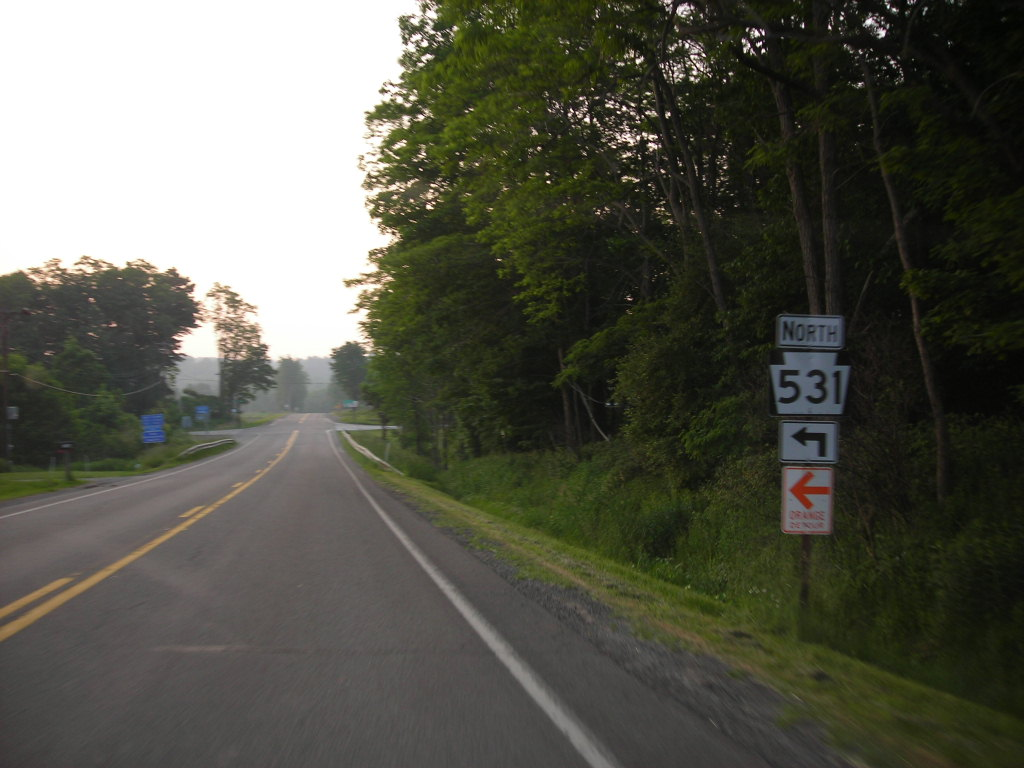
PA 430 at an intersection with PA 531

PA 531 begins at an intersection with PA 430 in Harborcreek Township, heading north on two-lane undivided Depot Road. The road passes through a mix of farmland and woodland before it reaches an interchange with Interstate 90 (I-90). After this interchange, the route turns to the northwest at a truck stop and continues past woods to the northeast and residential subdivisions to the southwest. PA 531 curves north again as it passes a couple farms before heading northwest near rural areas of homes. The route reaches its northern terminus at an intersection with US 20 next to Harbor Creek Jr./Sr. High School.

== Major intersections ==
The entire route is in Harborcreek Township, Erie County.

mi	km	Destinations	Notes
0.000	0.000	PA 430 (Station Road) / Walsh Road (SR 1009)	Southern terminus
1.595– 1.711	2.567– 2.754	I-90 – Erie, Buffalo	Exit 35 (I-90)
4.291	6.906	US 20 (Buffalo Road) – Erie, Buffalo	Northern terminus
1.000 mi = 1.609 km; 1.000 km = 0.621 mi
