= Pennsylvania Route 955 =

State highway in Erie County, Pennsylvania, US

Pennsylvania Route 955
- Iroquois Avenue

Route information
- Maintained by PennDOT
- Length: 3.85 mi (6.20 km)
- Existed: 1928–present

Major junctions
- West end: PA 5 in Lawrence Park
- East end: US 20 in Harborcreek

Location
- Country: United States
- State: Pennsylvania
- Counties: Erie

Highway system
- Pennsylvania State Route System; Interstate; US; State; Scenic; Legislative
← PA 954	→ PA 956

Pennsylvania Route 955 (PA 955, designated by the Pennsylvania Department of Transportation as SR 0955) is a 3.80-mile-long (6.12 km) state highway that runs between PA 5 in Lawrence Park Township and U.S. Route 20 (US 20) in Harborcreek Township. PA 955 continues to travel away from PA 5 as Iroquois Avenue in a diagonal until it reaches Nagle Road, where it straightens out and runs parallel to US 20. The highway stays parallel until US 20 makes a sharp left turn and intersects with PA 955. The route was first signed in 1928 and widened from PA 5 to an intersection with Nagle Road with a grassy median between 1950 and 1958.

== Route description ==
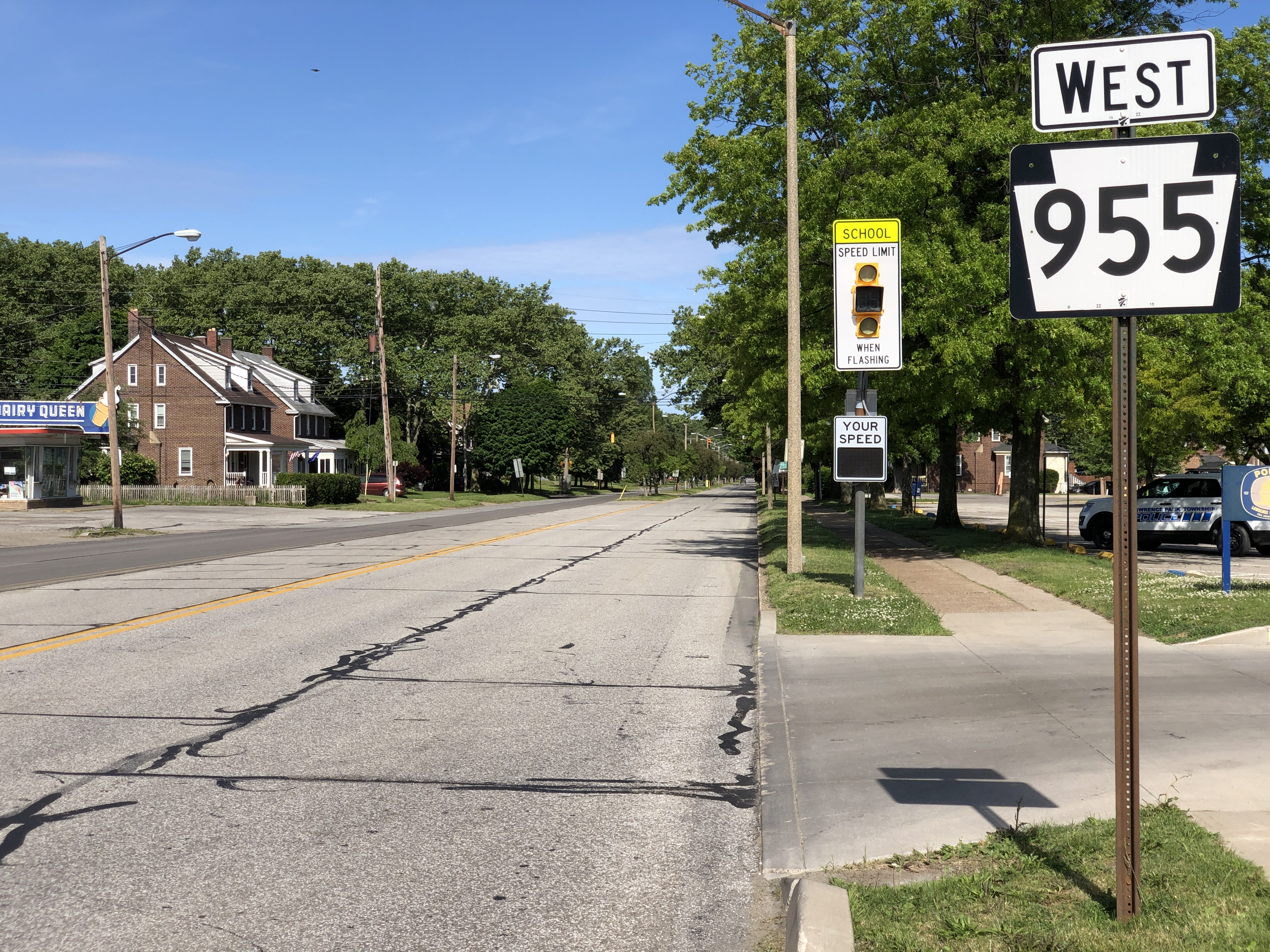
PA 955 westbound in Lawrence Park Township

PA 955 begins at an intersection with PA 5 (Lake Road) in Lawrence Park Township. The highway progresses eastward along Iroquois Avenue, crossing through a local residential complex as a two-lane roadway. Separated by a grassy median, PA 955 heads eastward into a commercial district for Lawrence Park Township near the intersection with Smithson Avenue. The highway remains two lanes its entire length, but after the intersection with Nagle Road, it becomes an undivided highway and turns to the northeast from its eastward progression. From this intersection, PA 955 becomes surrounded by woodlands, soon entering farmlands and entering Harborcreek Township, where the surroundings sporadically return to residential. After weaving its way through more woodlands, PA 955 begins to parallel several rail lines and US 20 northeastward. During this parallel, the surroundings remain rural and after a short distance, US 20 curves northward and intersects with PA 955, which terminates at that intersection. US 20 continues northeastward along the right-of-way.

== History ==
Prior to 1928, the state ran PA 955 as the Iroquois Avenue Extension, using its entire alignment as a non-state highway from Lawrence Park to an intersection with then Legislative Route 87 in the community of Harborcreek. PA 955 was originally signed in 1928 as part of the mass commissioning of state highways around Pennsylvania. However, the highway was still in construction which in turn was completed the next year to state standards. In 1950, the Pennsylvania Department of Highways (the predecessor to the Department of Transportation), widened PA 955 from PA 5 in Lawrence Park to the intersection with Nagle Road and in turn added a new grassy median eight years later. The roadway has remained virtually unchanged since the 1958 addition.

== Major intersections ==
The entire route is in Erie County.

Location	mi	km	Destinations	Notes
Lawrence Park	0.00	0.00	PA 5 (East Lake Road) – Erie, Buffalo	Western terminus
Harborcreek Township	3.85	6.20	US 20 (Buffalo Road)	Eastern terminus
1.000 mi = 1.609 km; 1.000 km = 0.621 mi
