= Pennsylvania Route 430 =

State highway in Erie County, Pennsylvania, US

Pennsylvania Route 430

Route information
- Maintained by PennDOT
- Length: 13.703 mi (22.053 km)
- Existed: 1959–present

Major junctions
- West end: US 20 in Wesleyville
- I-90 in Harborcreek Township; PA 89 in Greenfield Township
- East end: NY 430 at the New York state line in Greenfield Township

Location
- Country: United States
- State: Pennsylvania
- Counties: Erie

Highway system
- Pennsylvania State Route System; Interstate; US; State; Scenic; Legislative
← PA 428	→ PA 432

Pennsylvania Route 430 (PA 430) (also known by the Pennsylvania Department of Transportation as SR 0430) is a 13.70-mile-long (22.05 km) state highway located in Erie County, Pennsylvania. The western terminus is at US 20 in Wesleyville. The eastern terminus is the New York state line near Findley Lake, New York.

== Route description ==
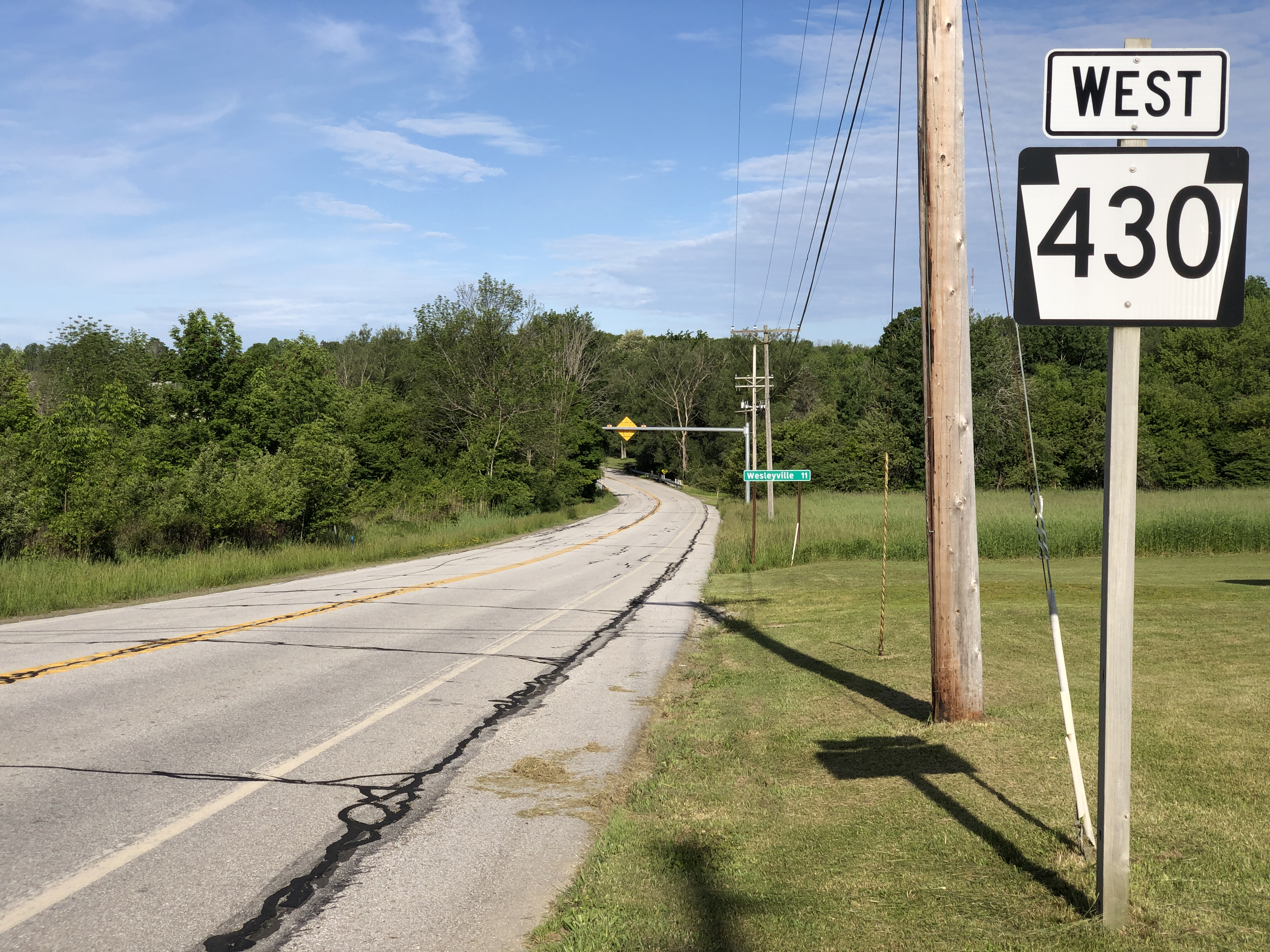
PA 430 westbound past PA 89 in Greenfield Township

PA 430 begins at an intersection with US 20 (Buffalo Road) in the borough of Wesleyville just south of the railroad tracks through the borough. PA 430 proceeds southeast along Station Road, a two-lane residential street through Wesleyville, running several blocks through the borough. At the junction with Euclid Boulevard, PA 430 and Station Road turn eastward while the right-of-way becomes Shannon Road. Becoming a commercial street through the eastern parts of the borough, soon crossing into Harborcreek Township. Crossing southeast through the township, PA 430 returns to a two-lane residential road, entering the Brookside neighborhood.

Through Brookside, PA 430 remains a two-lane residential street, soon leaving the community for another portion of Harborcreek Township. The route then intersects and merges with PA 290 (the Bayfront Connector). PA 290 and PA 430 become concurrent eastward along the four-lane arterial. Station Road becomes a frontage road for the Connector, which soon turns southeast into an interchange with exit 32 of I-90. At this interchange, PA 290 ends and PA 430 continues southeast along Station Road as the Bayfront Connector ends. Still in Harborcreek Township, PA 430 bends eastward as a two-lane residential road, which slowly becomes a two-lane rural roadway. The route then enters the village of Owens Corners, where it intersects with the southern terminus of PA 531 (Depot Road).

Continuing east from PA 531, PA 430 climbs some local hills and becomes more rural as it climbs through Harbocreek Township. Crossing into Greenfield Township, the route becomes more residential as it runs down the hill, retaining the Station Road moniker. The route becomes more rural again as the route enters the village of Hornby, soon crossing the southern end of Greenfield Community Park. PA 430 runs along a curve to the northeast and immediately turns east into an intersection with PA 89. After PA 89, PA 430 turns northeast further through another hill in Greenfield Township Now a more rural highway, the route parallels to the south of I-86, where it turns southeast to the New York state line, marking the eastern end of PA 430. The route continues east along Station Road on New York State Route 430 (NY 430).

== History ==
State Route 430 was assigned to a previously unnumbered roadway in Erie County in 1959. The route was assigned as a continuation of New York State Route 430 (assigned by 1935 in NY), which had been extended from Mayville. The two designations have remained the same since.

== Major intersections ==
The entire route is in Erie County.

Location	mi	km	Destinations	Notes
Wesleyville	0.000	0.000	US 20 (Buffalo Road)	Western terminus
Harborcreek Township	2.191	3.526	PA 290 west (Bayfront Connector) / Jordan Road – Penn State Erie	Western terminus of concurrency with PA 290
Harborcreek Township	3.155	5.077	I-90 – Buffalo, Erie	Exit 32 (I-90)
Harborcreek Township	3.452	5.555	PA 290 ends	Eastern terminus of PA 290
Harborcreek Township	5.465	8.795	PA 531 north (Depot Road)	Southern terminus of PA 531
Greenfield Township	10.437	16.797	PA 89	
Greenfield Township	13.703	22.053	NY 430 east (Station Road) – Findley Lake	New York state line; eastern terminus
1.000 mi = 1.609 km; 1.000 km = 0.621 mi: Concurrency terminus
