= Pennsylvania Route 215 =

State highway in Erie County, Pennsylvania, US

Pennsylvania Route 215

Route information
- Maintained by PennDOT
- Length: 7.874 mi (12.672 km)
- Existed: 1962–present

Major junctions
- South end: US 6N near Albion
- I-90 near Platea; US 20 in East Springfield
- North end: PA 5 in Springfield Township

Location
- Country: United States
- State: Pennsylvania
- Counties: Erie

Highway system
- Pennsylvania State Route System; Interstate; US; State; Scenic; Legislative
← PA 214	→ PA 216

Pennsylvania Route 215 (PA 215) is a 7.9-mile-long (12.7 km) state highway located in western Erie County, Pennsylvania. The southern terminus is at U.S. Route 6N (US 6N) near Albion. The northern terminus is at PA 5 in Springfield Township.

== Route description ==
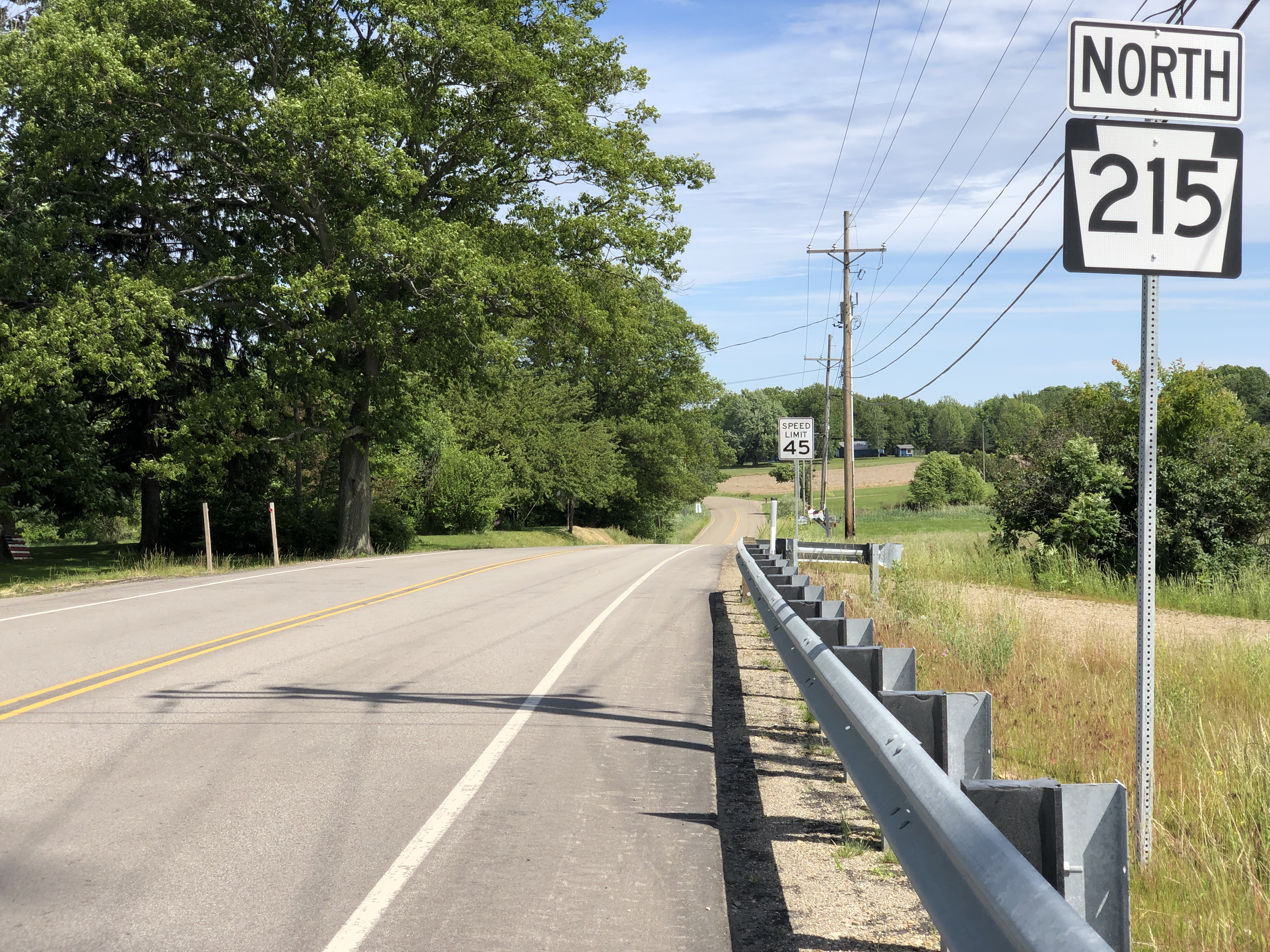
PA 215 northbound past I-90 in Springfield Township

PA 215 begins at an intersection with US 6N in Conneaut Township, Erie County, heading north on two-lane undivided Kidders Corner Road. The road runs through agricultural areas with some homes, turning northeast and crossing the wooded Conneaut Creek into Springfield Township. In this area, the route becomes Summerville Road and runs north through a mix of farmland and woodland with occasional residences, crossing the Canadian National's Bessemer Subdivision railroad line at-grade. Farther north, PA 215 comes to a diamond interchange with I-90. After this, the route heads through more rural areas as an unnamed road and reaches the residential community of East Springfield. In this area, the road comes to an intersection with US 20. PA 215 heads north through more farmland with some homes, becoming Academy Street. The route makes a turn to the west-northwest onto an unnamed road and crosses Norfolk Southern's Lake Erie District railroad line at-grade. The road runs through a mix of farm fields and woods with a few residences, turning to the north. PA 215 comes to its northern terminus at an intersection with PA 5.

== Major intersections ==
The entire route is in Erie County.

Location	mi	km	Destinations	Notes
Conneaut Township	0.000	0.000	US 6N – Albion	Southern terminus
Springfield Township	3.901	6.278	I-90 – Cleveland, Erie	Exit 6 (I-90)
Springfield Township	5.462	8.790	US 20 (West Ridge Road)	
Springfield Township	7.874	12.672	PA 5 (West Lake Road) / LECT – West Springfield, Erie	Northern terminus
1.000 mi = 1.609 km; 1.000 km = 0.621 mi
