= Lake City, Pennsylvania =

Borough in Pennsylvania, US

- Borough
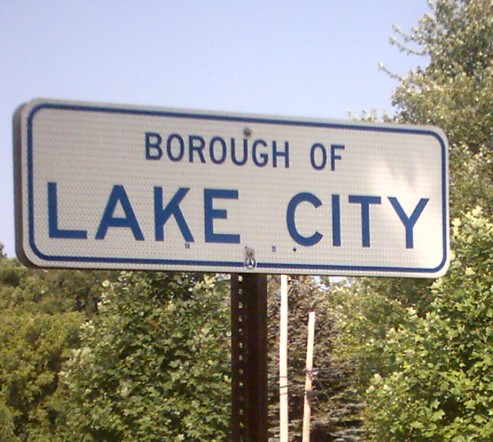
- Lake City borough sign

- Location in Erie County and the U.S. state of Pennsylvania.
- Coordinates: 42°1′2″N 80°20′48″W
- Country: United States
- State: Pennsylvania
- County: Erie

Government
  - Mayor: Andrew Graves

Area
  - Total: 1.81 sq mi (4.68 km^{2})
  - Land: 1.80 sq mi (4.65 km^{2})
  - Water: 0.0077 sq mi (0.02 km^{2})
- Elevation (Borough benchmark elevation): 721 ft (220 m)
- Highest elevation (southern borough boundary): 730 ft (220 m)
- Lowest elevation (Elk Creek): 578 ft (176 m)

Population (2020)
  - Total: 2,935
  - Density: 1,633.1/sq mi (630.54/km^{2})
- Time zone: UTC-5 (EST)
  - Summer (DST): UTC-4 (EDT)
- ZIP code: 16423
- Area code: 814
- FIPS code: 42-40960
- Website: lakecityboro.org

Lake City is a borough in Erie County, Pennsylvania, United States. The population was 2,936 at the 2020 census. As of the 2025 census estimates the population had decreased to 2,824. It is part of the Erie Metropolitan Statistical Area.

== History ==
Prior to European Colonization, the land that now contains Lake City was the home of the Erie people.

=== Miles Grove ===
The village of Miles Grove, or Girard Statio, is situated on the Lake Shore Railroad, a little over a mile east of the intersection of the Erie & Pittsburgh, one and three-quarter miles north of Girard, fifteen and a half west of Erie and eighty east of Cleveland. The population of the village by the census of 1880 was 471. The site of Miles Grove is one of the most suitable for a town in Erie County. The place was named after Judge Miles, who influenced the erection of the depot, the ground for which was given by Austin H. Seeley, who laid out the lots. It grew slowly for some years, but received a new impetus by the completion of the Erie & Pittsburg road, which caused it to be made a general stopping place for the trains. Another start was given to it by the location of A. Denio's fork and agricultural works, which furnish employment to about seventy persons. These works – now known as the Otsego Fork Mills – were brought to Mile Grove, part in 1874, and the balance in 1876, the citizens subscribing $5,000 to $5,000 to induce their removal. This industry was established at Albion thirty years ago. The handle department burned down in the year of 1873, when the entire business was transferred to Miles Grove, where a part of it was already in operation. The village contained an Episcopal and a Methodist Episcopal Church, a schoolhouse with three teachers, an iron foundry, a hotel – built by A. M. Osborn in the spring of 1865 – five or six stores, an express office, two shoe shops and two blacksmith shops. The Methodist Episcopal Church was built in 1867. It is used in part by the Presbyterians, according to a condition in the subscription paper. James Sampson donated the land on which the building stands. The Methodist Episcopal Congregation has belonged to Girard charge ever since its organization.

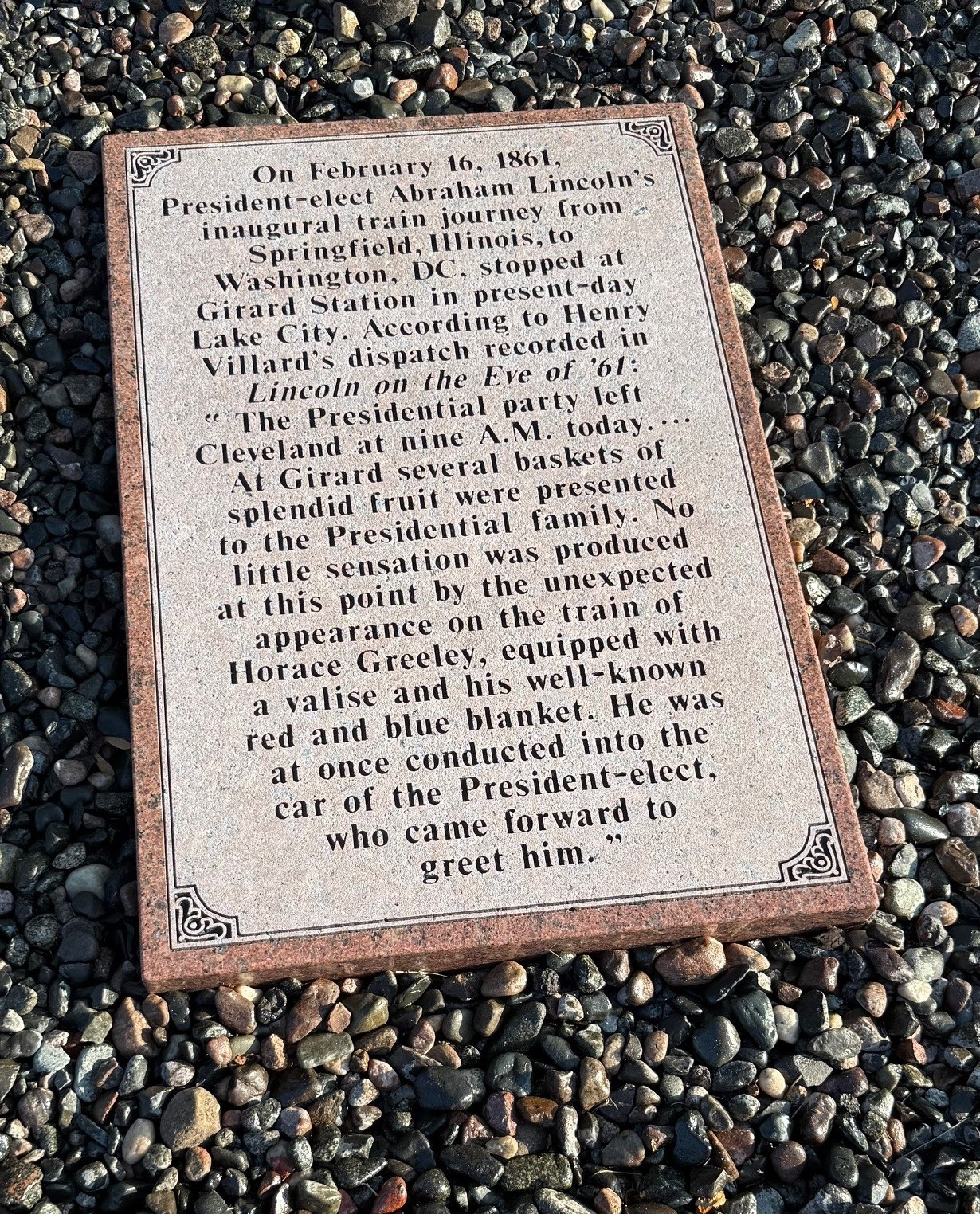
Abraham Lincoln in Lake City Historical Marker

== Geography ==
Lake City is located in western Erie County at 42°1′2″N 80°20′48″W (42.017349, −80.346641). It is bordered to the south by the borough of Girard, to the east and west and partially to the north by Girard Township, and partially to the north by Lake Erie.

According to the United States Census Bureau, the borough has a total area of 1.8 square miles (4.7 km^{2}), of which 0.01 square miles (0.02 km^{2}), or 0.47%, is water. Elk Creek passes through the westernmost part of the borough, then enters Lake Erie just west of the borough limits.

Lake City is served by two Pennsylvania state routes: Pennsylvania Route 5 running east–west as West Lake Road, and Pennsylvania Route 18 running north–south as Lake Street and Rice Avenue. PA 5 leads northeast 4 miles (6 km) to Avonia and southwest 13 miles (21 km) to Conneaut, Ohio, while PA 18 leads south into Girard. Erie is 15 miles (24 km) to the northeast. Most streets in Lake City are low density residential avenues. There are no traffic lights in Lake City.

== Demographics ==
Historical population
| Census | Pop. | Note | %± |
|---|---|---|---|
| 1930 | 1,077 | | — |
| 1940 | 1,108 | | 2.9% |
| 1950 | 1,369 | | 23.6% |
| 1960 | 1,722 | | 25.8% |
| 1970 | 2,117 | | 22.9% |
| 1980 | 2,384 | | 12.6% |
| 1990 | 2,519 | | 5.7% |
| 2000 | 2,811 | | 11.6% |
| 2010 | 3,031 | | 7.8% |
| 2020 | 2,935 | | −3.2% |
| 2025 (est.) | 2,824 | ▼ | −3.8% |

As of the census of 2010, there were 2,699 people, 1,025 households, and 788 families residing in the borough. The population density was 1,564.7 inhabitants per square mile (604.1/km^{2}). There were 1,076 housing units at an average density of 598.9 per square mile (231.2/km^{2}). The racial makeup of the borough was 99.32% White, 0.14% Asian, 0.14% from other races, and 0.39% from two or more races. Hispanic or Latino of any race were 0.60% of the population.

There were 1,025 households, out of which 40.8% had children under the age of 18 living with them, 57.0% were married couples living together, 15.7% had a female householder with no husband present, and 23.1% were non-families. 18.9% of all households were made up of individuals, and 7.6% had someone living alone who was 65 years of age or older. The average household size was 2.73 and the average family size was 3.12.

In the borough the population was spread out, with 30.0% under the age of 18, 8.0% from 18 to 24, 31.0% from 25 to 44, 20.1% from 45 to 64, and 10.9% who were 65 years of age or older. The median age was 35 years. For every 100 females there were 92.4 males. For every 100 females age 18 and over, there were 86.7 males.

The median income for a household in the borough was $35,481, and the median income for a family was $40,598. Males had a median income of $31,554 versus $21,533 for females. The per capita income for the borough was $15,419. About 9.2% of families and 10.6% of the population were below the poverty line, including 16.1% of those under age 18 and 6.0% of those age 65 or over.

== Notable person ==
- William Frederick "Bones" Ely, 19th century Major League Baseball player
