= McKean, Pennsylvania =

Borough in Pennsylvania, US

McKean
- Borough
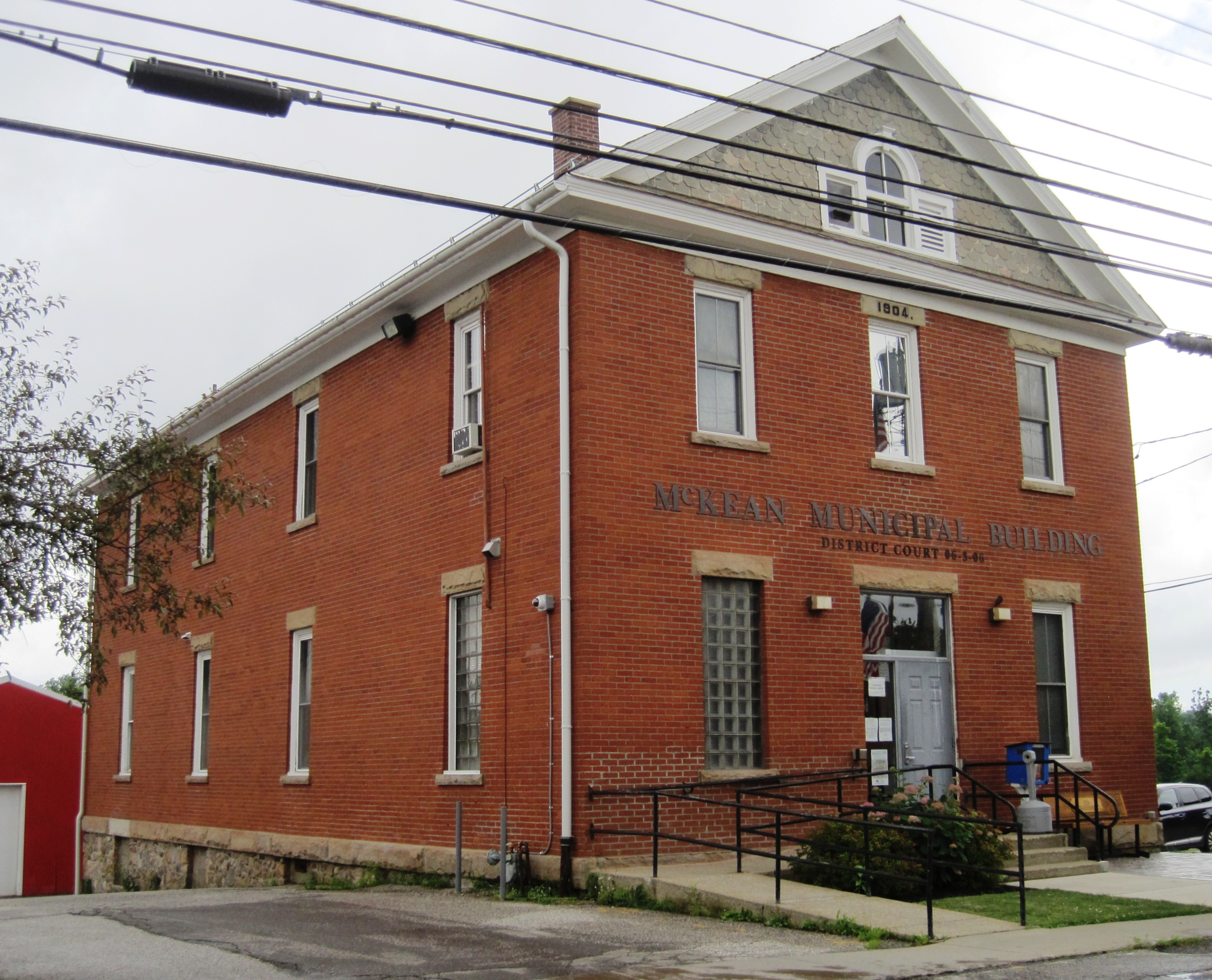
- McKean Borough Hall

- Location in Erie County and the U.S. state of Pennsylvania.
- Coordinates: 41°59′56″N 80°8′44″W
- Country: United States
- State: Pennsylvania
- County: Erie

Government
  - Mayor: Weslee Clapper-Krepps

Area
  - Total: 0.58 sq mi (1.51 km^{2})
  - Land: 0.57 sq mi (1.48 km^{2})
  - Water: 0.012 sq mi (0.03 km^{2})
- Elevation (Borough benchmark): 1,022 ft (312 m)
- Highest elevation (southeast corner of borough): 1,200 ft (370 m)
- Lowest elevation (Elk Creek): 985 ft (300 m)

Population (2020)
  - Total: 476
  - Density: 832.4/sq mi (321.38/km^{2})
- Time zone: UTC-4 (EST)
  - Summer (DST): UTC-5 (EDT)
- ZIP code: 16426
- Area code: 814
- FIPS code: 42-46216
- Website: www.mckeanborough.com

McKean is a borough in Erie County, Pennsylvania. The population was 475 at the time of the 2020 census. It is part of the Erie–Meadville combined statistical area. McKean was known as "Middleboro" until it officially changed its name in 1970.

== Geography ==
McKean is located in central Erie County at 41°59′56″N 80°8′44″W (41.998941, -80.145475). It is surrounded by McKean Township. Pennsylvania Route 99 passes through the borough, leading north 5 miles (8 km) to U.S. Route 19 in the outskirts of Erie and south 8 miles (13 km) to Edinboro. Interstate 79 passes one mile (1.6 km) west of McKean, with access from Exit 174. I-79 leads north 12 miles (19 km) to downtown Erie and south 27 miles (43 km) to the Meadville area.

According to the United States Census Bureau, McKean borough has a total area of 0.58 square miles (1.5 km^{2}), of which 0.01 square miles (0.03 km^{2}), or 1.82%, is water. The borough is located along Elk Creek, which flows west to Lake Erie.

== Demographics ==
Historical population
Census	Pop.	Note	%±
1870	126		—
1880	210		66.7%
1890	195		−7.1%
1900	207		6.2%
1910	207		0.0%
1920	239		15.5%
1930	291		21.8%
1940	320		10.0%
1950	379		18.4%
1960	442		16.6%
1970	462		4.5%
1980	465		0.6%
1990	418		−10.1%
2000	389		−6.9%
2010	388		−0.3%
2020	476		22.7%
2021 (est.)	482	▲	1.3%

As of the census of 2000, there were 389 people, 150 households, and 100 families residing in the borough. The population density was 673.6 inhabitants per square mile (260.1/km^{2}). There were 161 housing units at an average density of 278.8 per square mile (107.6/km^{2}). The racial makeup of the borough was 99.49% White, 0.26% African American, and 0.26% from two or more races. Hispanic or Latino of any race were 0.51% of the population.

There were 150 households, out of which 38.0% had children under the age of 18 living with them, 49.3% were married couples living together, 12.7% had a female householder with no husband present, and 33.3% were non-families. 26.7% of all households were made up of individuals, and 12.0% had someone living alone who was 65 years of age or older. The average household size was 2.57 and the average family size was 3.17.

In the borough the population was spread out, with 28.0% under the age of 18, 10.3% from 18 to 24, 25.7% from 25 to 44, 23.7% from 45 to 64, and 12.3% who were 65 years of age or older. The median age was 37 years. For every 100 females there were 95.5 males. For every 100 females age 18 and over, there were 90.5 males.

The median income for a household in the borough was $39,063, and the median income for a family was $46,250. Males had a median income of $31,875 versus $24,844 for females. The per capita income for the borough was $16,403. About 6.9% of families and 5.4% of the population were below the poverty line, including 8.8% of those under age 18 and none of those age 65 or over.

== Notable residents ==
- Jack Stauber, musician, animator, and internet personality
