= State Line, Erie County, Pennsylvania =

Unincorporated community in Pennsylvania, US

Coordinates: 42.242°N 79.763°W

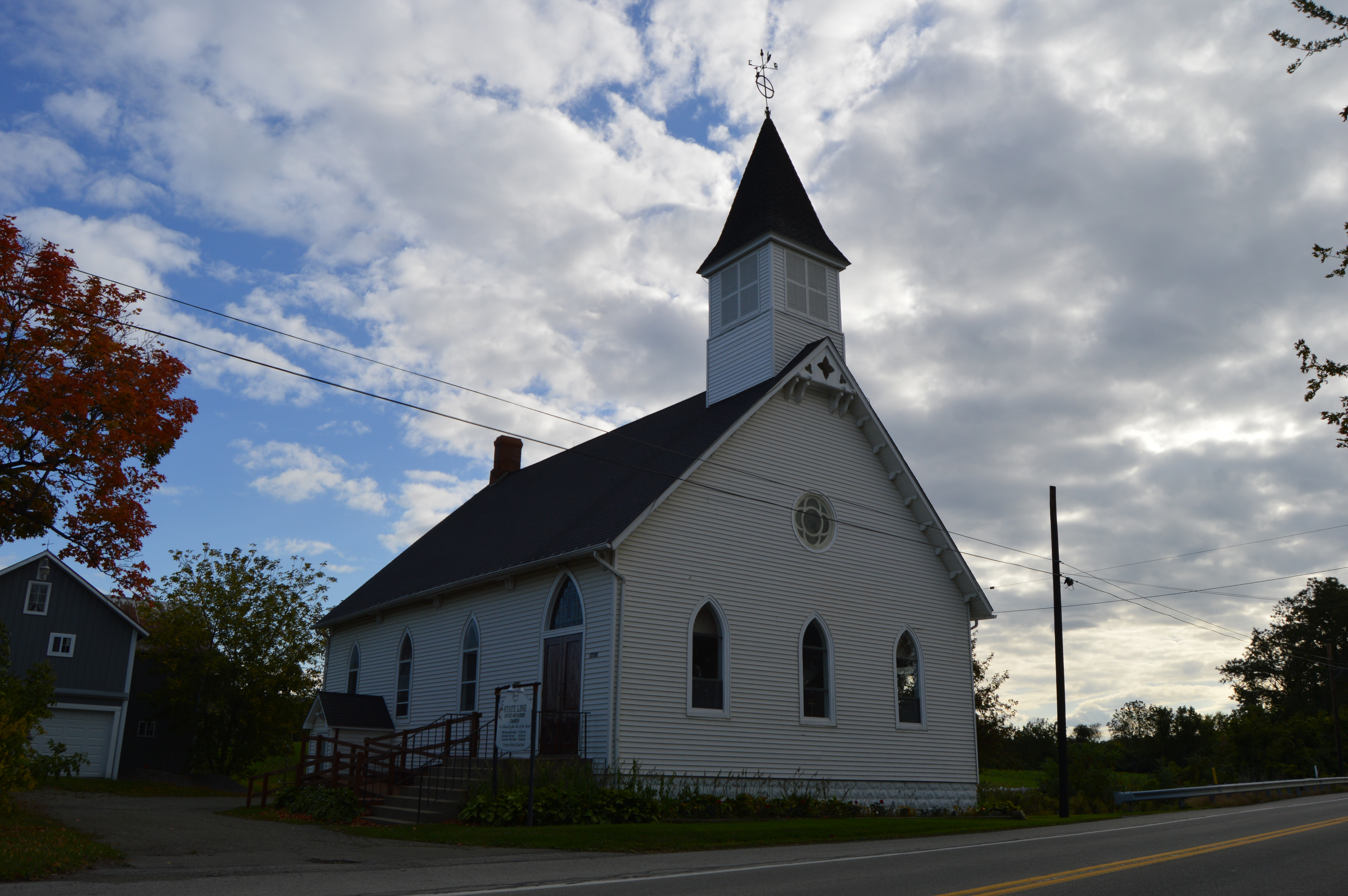
State Line Methodist Church

State Line is an unincorporated community in North East Township in Erie County, Pennsylvania, United States, located just to the west of the New York state line.
