= Harborcreek, Pennsylvania =

Unincorporated community in Pennsylvania, US

- Unincorporated community
- Location within Pennsylvania
- Coordinates: 42°09′59″N 79°57′10″W
- Country: United States
- State: Pennsylvania
- County: Erie
- Elevation: 718 ft (219 m)
- Time zone: UTC-5 (Eastern (EST))
  - Summer (DST): UTC-4 (EDT)
- ZIP code: 16421
- Area code: 814
- GNIS feature ID: 1176502

Harborcreek is an unincorporated community in Erie County, Pennsylvania, United States. The community is located along U.S. Route 20, 7.2 miles (11.6 km) east-northeast of Erie. Harborcreek has a post office with ZIP code 16421.
