= Elk Creek (Lake Erie) =

- Location of the mouth of Elk Creek in Pennsylvania
- Etymology: the "elk"

Location
- Country: United States
- State: Pennsylvania
- County: Erie

Physical characteristics
- Source
  - location: McKean Township, Erie County, Pennsylvania
  - coordinates: 41°58′26″N 80°5′20″W
  - elevation: 1,363 ft (415 m)
- Mouth: Lake Erie
  - location: Lake City, Erie County, Pennsylvania
  - coordinates: 42°1′28″N 80°22′20″W
  - elevation: 572 ft (174 m)
- Length: 30.4 mi (48.9 km)
- Basin size: 99.4 sq mi (257 km^{2})

Basin features
- Tributaries
  - right: Little Elk Creek

Elk Creek is a 30.4-mile (48.9 km) tributary of Lake Erie in Erie County, Pennsylvania in the United States. The creek is part of the Lake Erie Watershed and has a drainage basin of 99.4 square miles (257 km^{2}). Elk Creek is stocked with brown trout and steelhead by the Pennsylvania Fish and Boat Commission.

== Course ==
Elk Creek has its origins in Fairview Township, McKean Township, and part of Summit Township. The creek flows northwest through Erie County and enters Lake Erie just west of Lake City in Girard Township.

Little Elk Creek joins Elk Creek in Girard Township and has its origins south in Elk Creek and Franklin Townships.

Elk Creek Access is a local park which can be reached off Pennsylvania Route 5.

== See also ==
- List of rivers of Pennsylvania
