= Franklin Township, Erie County, Pennsylvania =

Township in Pennsylvania, US

Coordinates: 41°55′00″N 80°12′59″W

Franklin Township
- Township
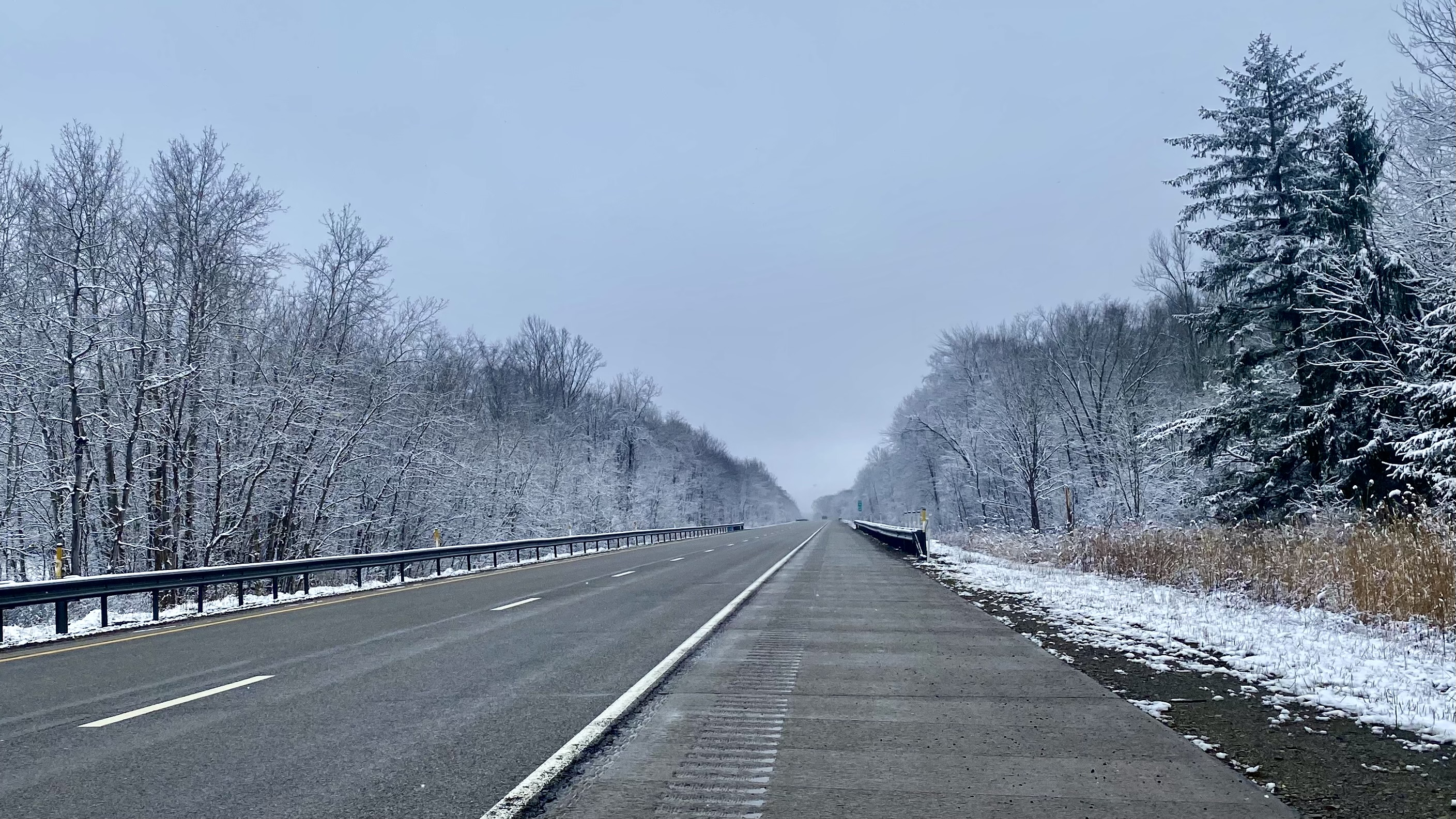
- Southbound I-79 in Franklin Township

- Location in Erie County and the U.S. state of Pennsylvania
- Country: United States
- State: Pennsylvania
- County: Erie

Area
  - Total: 28.70 sq mi (74.34 km^{2})
  - Land: 28.66 sq mi (74.24 km^{2})
  - Water: 0.039 sq mi (0.10 km^{2})
- Highest elevation (southeastern end of the township): 1,430 ft (440 m)
- Lowest elevation (tributary to Elk Creek): 872 ft (266 m)

Population (2020)
  - Total: 1,507 ▼
  - Estimate (2024): 1,485
  - Density: 56.8/sq mi (21.92/km^{2})
- Time zone: UTC-4 (EST)
  - Summer (DST): UTC-5 (EDT)
- Area code: 814
- FIPS code: 42-049-27392
- Website: franklintownship.info

Franklin Township is a township in Erie County, Pennsylvania, United States. As of the 2020 census, the township population was 1,507, which is down from the population of 1,633 in 2010.

== Geography ==
According to the United States Census Bureau, the township has a total area of 28.7 square miles (74.3 km^{2}), of which 28.6 square miles (74.2 km^{2}) is land and 0.04 square miles (0.1 km^{2}), or 0.14%, is water.

== Demographics ==
Historical population
Census	Pop.	Note	%±
2000	1,609		—
2010	1,633		1.5%
2020	1,507		−7.7%
2024 (est.)	1,485		−1.5%
U.S. Decennial Census

As of the census of 2000, there were 1,609 people, 554 households, and 464 families residing in the township. The population density was 55.9 inhabitants per square mile (21.6/km^{2}). There were 569 housing units at an average density of 19.8/sq mi (7.6/km^{2}). The racial makeup of the township was 99.19% White, 0.12% African American, 0.12% Asian, 0.12% from other races, and 0.44% from two or more races. Hispanic or Latino of any race were 0.25% of the population.

There were 554 households, out of which 39.2% had children under the age of 18 living with them, 69.9% were married couples living together, 7.6% had a female householder with no husband present, and 16.2% were non-families. 12.8% of all households were made up of individuals, and 4.7% had someone living alone who was 65 years of age or older. The average household size was 2.90 and the average family size was 3.16.

In the township, the population was spread out, with 29.0% under the age of 18, 6.0% from 18 to 24, 30.1% from 25 to 44, 27.1% from 45 to 64, and 7.7% who were 65 years of age or older. The median age was 37 years. For every 100 females, there were 99.9 males. For every 100 females age 18 and over, there were 100.0 males.

The median income for a household in the township was $49,483, and the median income for a family was $50,789. Males had a median income of $36,759 versus $26,310 for females. The per capita income for the township was $17,898. About 2.0% of families and 3.0% of the population were below the poverty line, including 4.1% of those under age 18 and 5.9% of those age 65 or over.
