= McKean Township, Pennsylvania =

Township in Pennsylvania, US

McKean Township
- Township
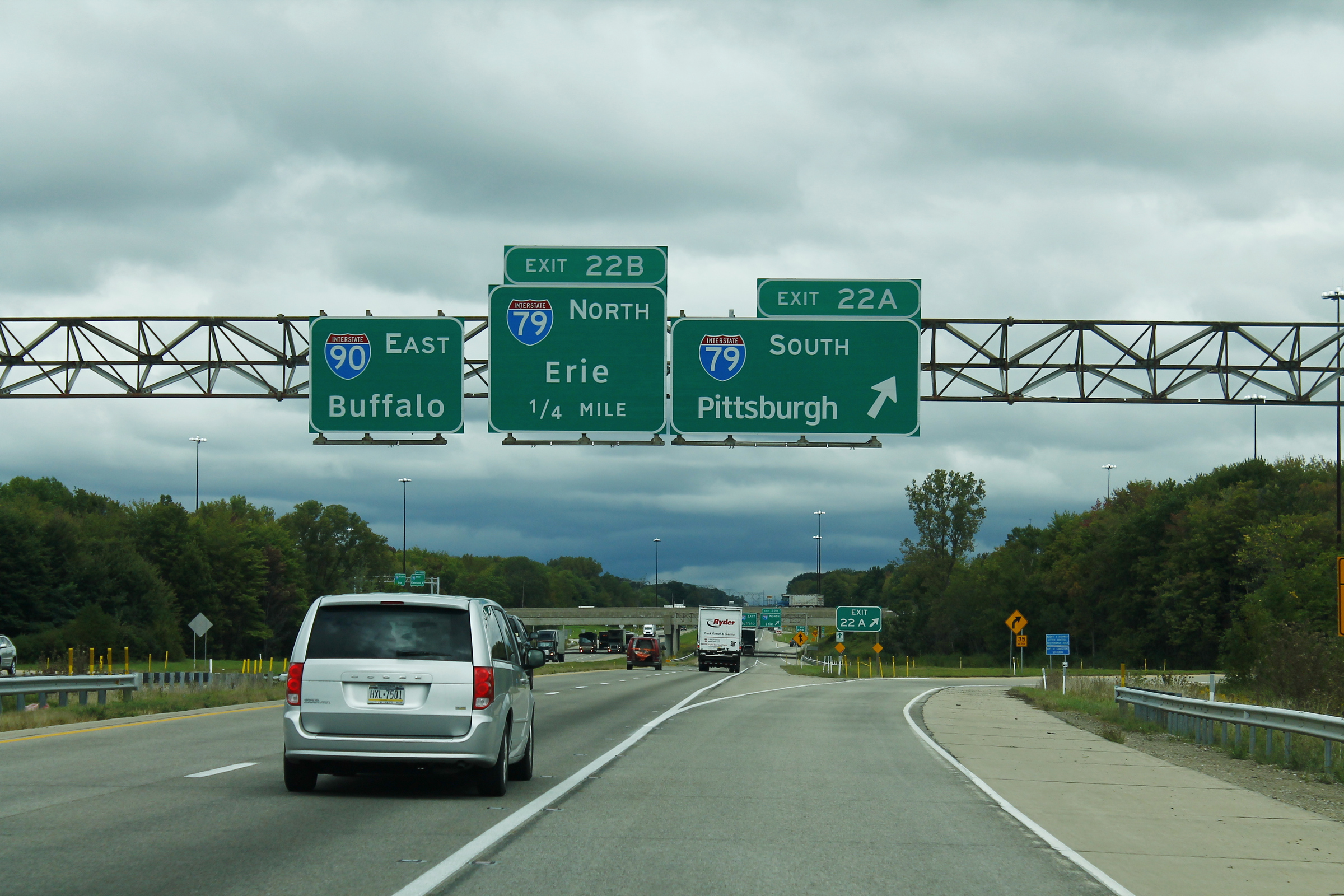
- Junction of Interstates 79 and 90 in McKean Township

- Location in Erie County and the state of Pennsylvania.

- Location of Pennsylvania in the United States
- Coordinates: 41°58′0″N 80°4′59″W
- Country: United States
- State: Pennsylvania
- County: Erie
- Settled: 1795
- Incorporated: March 12, 1800

Area
  - Total: 36.95 sq mi (95.71 km^{2})
  - Land: 36.80 sq mi (95.31 km^{2})
  - Water: 0.15 sq mi (0.40 km^{2})
- Highest elevation (southeast corner of township): 1,570 ft (480 m)
- Lowest elevation (Elk Creek): 850 ft (260 m)

Population (2020)
  - Total: 4,437
  - Estimate (2023): 4,370
  - Density: 119.0/sq mi (45.93/km^{2})
- Time zone: UTC-4 (EST)
  - Summer (DST): UTC-5 (EDT)
- Area code: 814
- FIPS code: 42-049-46224
- Website: www.mckeantownship.com

McKean Township is a township in Erie County, Pennsylvania, United States. The population was 4,437 at the 2020 census, up from 4,409 at the 2010 census, down from 4,619 in 2000.

== Geography ==
The township is in the central part of Erie County and surrounds the borough of McKean, a separate municipality. According to the United States Census Bureau, the township has a total area of 36.9 square miles (95.7 km^{2}), of which 36.8 square miles (95.3 km^{2}) is land and 0.15 square miles (0.4 km^{2}), or 0.41%, is water. The principal streams are Elk Creek, which flows west into Lake Erie, and its tributary Lamson Run.

Interstate 79 and Interstate 90 intersect in the northeastern corner of the township. The interchange is 8 miles (13 km) south of downtown Erie, 96 miles (154 km) southwest of Buffalo, New York, 119 miles (192 km) north of Pittsburgh, and 93 miles (150 km) northeast of Cleveland, Ohio.

McKean Township is located in the Lake Erie Snowbelt and receives significant amounts of lake effect snow every winter.

== Demographics ==
Historical population
Census	Pop.	Note	%±
2000	4,619		—
2010	4,409		−4.5%
2020	4,437		0.6%
2023 (est.)	4,370		−1.5%
U.S. Decennial Census

As of the census of 2000, there were 4,619 people, 1,649 households, and 1,322 families residing in the township. The population density was 126.2 inhabitants per square mile (48.7/km^{2}). There were 1,714 housing units at an average density of 46.8 per square mile (18.1/km^{2}). The racial makeup of the township was 98.20% White, 0.56% African American, 0.39% Native American, 0.11% Asian, 0.28% from other races, and 0.45% from two or more races. Hispanic or Latino of any race were 0.71% of the population.

There were 1,649 households, out of which 39.1% had children under the age of 18 living with them, 67.6% were married couples living together, 8.9% had a female householder with no husband present, and 19.8% were non-families. 15.3% of all households were made up of individuals, and 5.3% had someone living alone who was 65 years of age or older. The average household size was 2.80 and the average family size was 3.12.

In the township the population was spread out, with 28.0% under the age of 18, 7.2% from 18 to 24, 28.7% from 25 to 44, 27.2% from 45 to 64, and 8.9% who were 65 years of age or older. The median age was 37 years. For every 100 females, there were 101.3 males. For every 100 females age 18 and over, there were 100.4 males.

The median income for a household in the township was $41,961, and the median income for a family was $47,746. Males had a median income of $36,408 versus $21,943 for females. The per capita income for the township was $18,457. About 3.3% of families and 5.1% of the population were below the poverty line, including 6.5% of those under age 18 and 3.5% of those age 65 or over.

== Sources ==
- Hottenstein, JoAnne; Welch, Sibyl (1965). "Erie County". Incorporation dates of Pennsylvania municipalities (PDF). Harrisburg: Bureau of Municipal Affairs, Pennsylvania Department of Internal Affairs.
