= Fairview Township, Erie County, Pennsylvania =

Township in Pennsylvania, US

Coordinates: 42°01′00″N 80°15′05″W

- Township
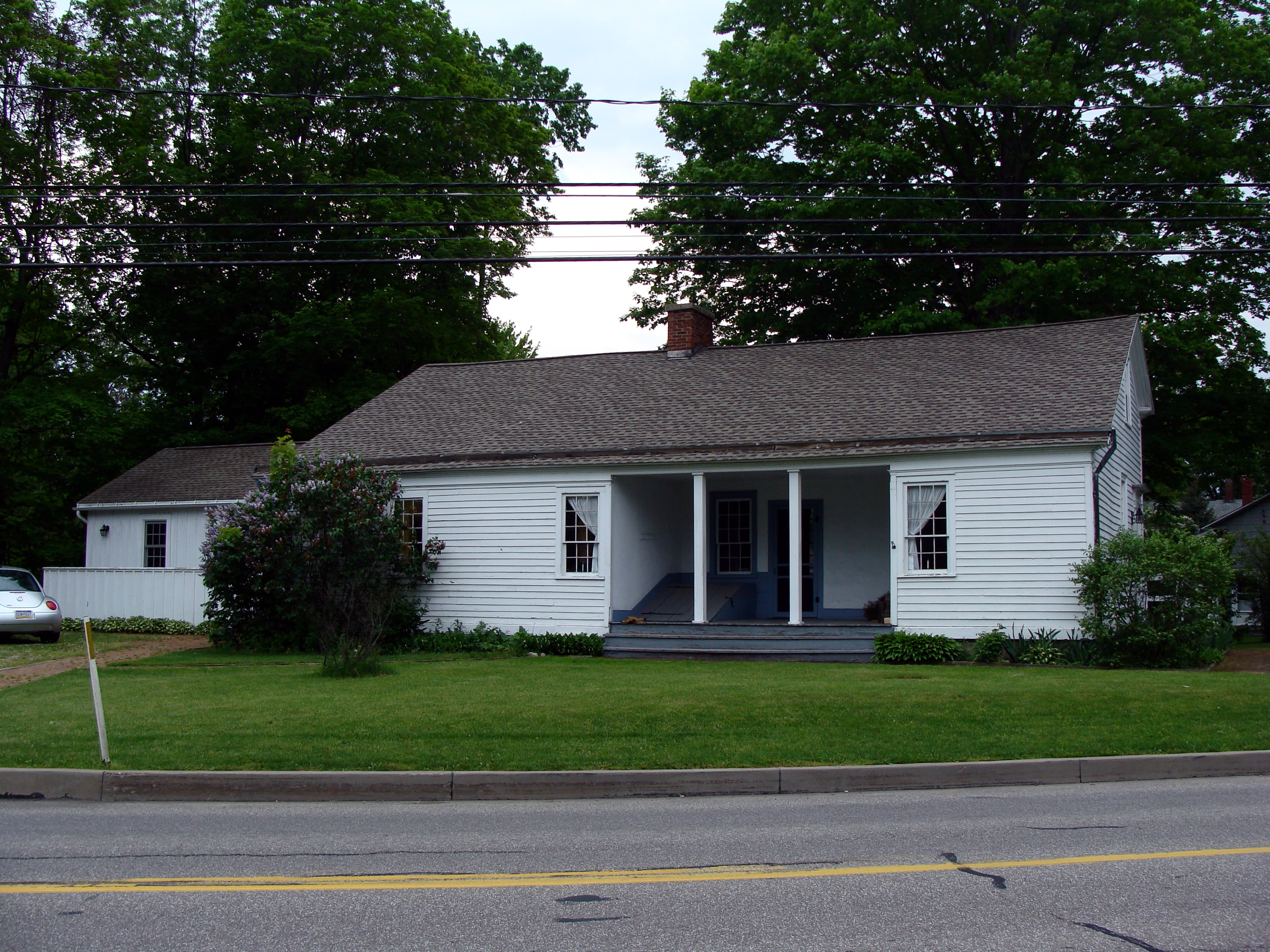
- Sturgeon House in Fairview

- Location in Erie County and the U.S. state of Pennsylvania
- Country: United States
- State: Pennsylvania
- County: Erie

Area
  - Total: 29.16 sq mi (75.53 km^{2})
  - Land: 28.90 sq mi (74.86 km^{2})
  - Water: 0.25 sq mi (0.66 km^{2})
- Highest elevation (southeast corner west of Eureka Road): 1,180 ft (360 m)
- Lowest elevation (Lake Erie): 572 ft (174 m)

Population (2020)
  - Total: 11,137 ▲
  - Estimate (2024): 11,439
  - Density: 351.2/sq mi (135.58/km^{2})
- Time zone: UTC-4 (EST)
  - Summer (DST): UTC-5 (EDT)
- Area code: 814
- FIPS code: 42-049-24864
- Website: www.fairviewtownship.com

Fairview Township is a township in Erie County, Pennsylvania, United States. Situated on the southern shore of Lake Erie, it was one of the county's sixteen original townships, and was founded in 1797.

In 1998 Fairview Township annexed the former Fairview Borough.

According to the 2020 U.S. Census, the township's population was 11,137, which is an increase from the 2010 census of 10,102. It is part of the Erie Metropolitan Statistical Area.

== History ==
One of Erie County's sixteen original townships, Fairview Township was established in 1797. It reportedly took its name from the utterance that year of a businessman, Colonel Thomas Forster, who said of his land purchase at the mouth of Walnut Creek: "This is the fairest view I have seen yet."

In 1832, the township was downsized with the redistribution of part of its territory to the newly formed Girard Township.

Early in the 19th century, stagecoaches traveled through Fairview. In 1844, the Erie Extension Canal began operating. By 1961, Interstate 90 and a local interchange were constructed in the township. The Sturgeon House, a historic home now serving as a museum, was listed on the National Register of Historic Places in 1980. In 1998 Fairview Township annexed the former Fairview Borough.

== Geography ==
Fairview Township is bounded to the north by Lake Erie, to the west by Girard Township, to the south by Franklin Township, to the southeast by McKean Township, and to the northeast by Millcreek Township. The township includes the communities of Fairview and Avonia.

According to the United States Census Bureau, the township has a total area of 29.2 square miles (75.5 km^{2}), of which 29.0 square miles (75.0 km^{2}) is land and 0.19 square miles (0.5 km^{2}), or 0.66 percent, is water.

== Demographics ==
Historical population
Census	Pop.	Note	%±
1980	7,518		—
1990	7,839		4.3%
2000	10,140		29.4%
2010	10,102		−0.4%
2020	11,137		10.2%
2024 (est.)	11,439		2.7%
U.S. Decennial Census

As of the census of 2010 there were 10,102 people, 4,018 households, and 2,831 families residing in the township. The population density was 347.7 inhabitants per square mile (134.2/km^{2}). There were 3,711 housing units at an average density of 127.3 per square mile (49.2/km^{2}). The racial makeup of the township was 97.61 percent White, 0.62 percent African American, 0.01 percent Native American, 0.65 percent Asian, 0.24 percent from other races, and 0.67 percent from two or more races. Hispanic or Latino of any race were 0.68 percent of the population.

There were 4,018 households, out of which 36.0 percent had children under the age of 18 living with them, 70.1 percent were married couples living together, 7.2 percent had a female householder with no husband present, and 19.9 percent were non-families. 16.9 percent of all households were made up of individuals, and 7.9 percent had someone living alone who was 65 years of age or older. The average household size was 2.70 and the average family size was 3.05.

In the township the population was spread out, with 22.4 percent under the age of 18, 3.4 percent from 18 to 24, 26.5 percent from 25 to 49, 25.2 percent from 50 to 64, and 20.4 percent who were 65 years of age or older. The median age was 42 years. For every 100 females there were 91.9 males. For every 100 females age 18 and over, there were 88.3 males.

The median income for a household in the township was $55,600, and the median income for a family was $61,764. Males had a median income of $45,818 versus $27,813 for females. The per capita income for the township was $26,397. About 2.3 percent of families and 3.6 percent of the population were below the poverty line, including 4.7 percent of those under age 18 and 3.1 percent of those age 65 or over.

== Schools ==
Fairview Township is served by the Fairview School District. Schools in the district are:

- Fairview Elementary School
- Fairview Middle School
- Fairview High School

== Notable persons ==
- Jim Hart, Major League Baseball manager for the Louisville Colonels and the Boston Beaneaters
- Walker Scobell, actor
