= Dobbins Landing =

- Carries: State Street
- Spans: Presque Isle Bay
- Location: Erie, Pennsylvania
- Coordinates: 42°08′15.89″N 80°05′26.35″W

Dobbins Landing is a popular tourist area located at the edge of Presque Isle Bay at the terminus of State Street in Erie, Pennsylvania. Consisting of a wharf and adjoining facilities, the landing includes the Bicentennial Tower, the Sheraton Erie Hotel, and the Bayfront Convention Center.

The landing is named after Captain Daniel Dobbins, an early 19th-century sailing master in the U.S. Navy who supervised the construction of a squadron of warships used in the Battle of Lake Erie. During the summer months, the Presque Isle Water Taxi travels between Dobbins Land and Presque Isle State Park.
