= Charles Manning Reed Mansion =

- U.S. National Register of Historic Places
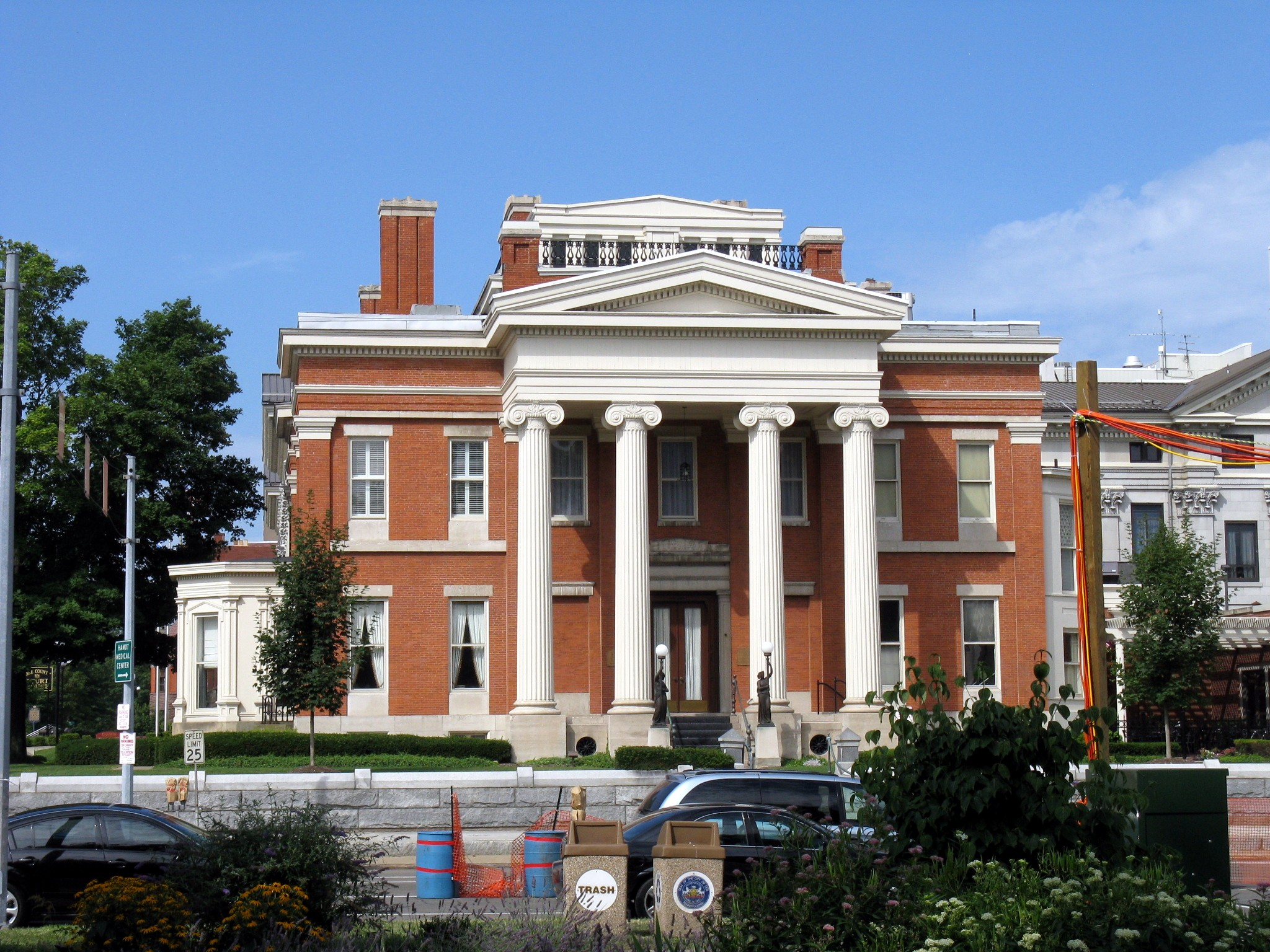
- Erie Club, July 2010

- Location within Pennsylvania Location within the United States
- Interactive map showing the location of Charles Manning Reed House
- Location: 524 Peach Street, Erie, Pennsylvania
- Coordinates: 42°7′44″N 80°5′15″W
- Area: 0.6 acres (0.24 ha)
- Built: 1846–1849
- Built by: J & W Hoskinson
- Architect: E. B. Smith
- Architectural style: Greek Revival
- NRHP reference No.: 82003786
- Added to NRHP: April 19, 1982

Charles Manning Reed Mansion, also known as the Erie Club, is a historic home and clubhouse located at Erie, Erie County, Pennsylvania. The original section of the 2-1/2-story, brick mansion was built between 1846 and 1849. It was expanded with a one-story bay about 1855, a two-story bay about 1865, and a two-story extension in 1970. The front facade features a pedimented portico with four two-story, fluted Ionic order columns in the Greek Revival style. Connected to the house is a one-story, recreation hall measuring 20 feet (6.1 m) wide and 120 feet (37 m) long, with an addition built about 1920. Its builder was a descendant of the first permanent settler of Erie, Colonel Set Reed. The Erie Club purchased the property in 1904.

It was added to the National Register of Historic Places in 1982. It is located in the West Sixth Street Historic District.
