= West Sixth Street Historic District =

Historic district in Pennsylvania, United States

- U.S. National Register of Historic Places
- U.S. Historic district
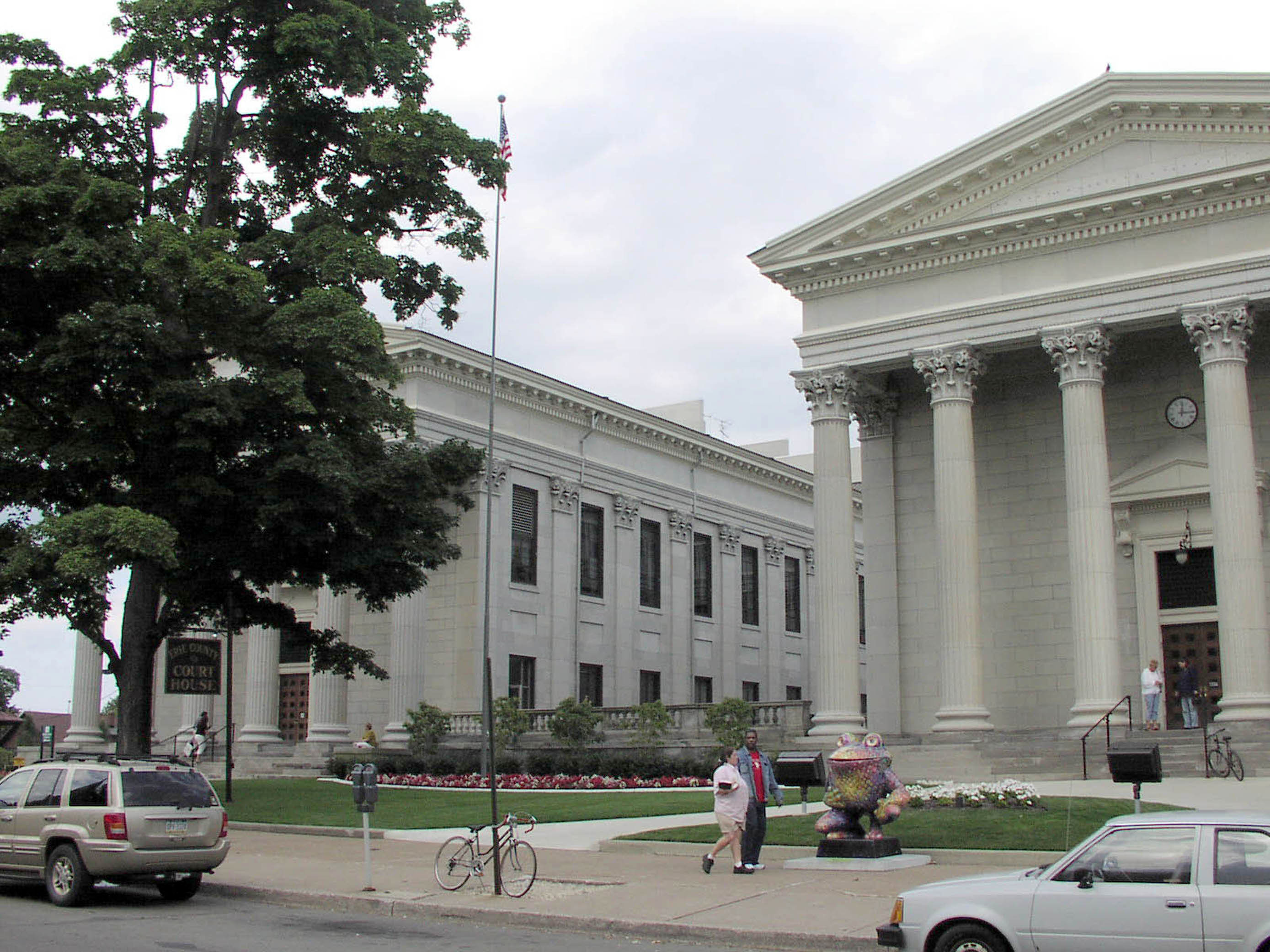
- Erie County Courthouse, c. 2005

- Location within Pennsylvania Location within the United States
- Location: W. 6th St. from Poplar to Peach St., Erie, Pennsylvania
- Coordinates: 42°07′35″N 80°05′34″W
- Area: 55 acres (22 ha)
- Architect: Multiple
- Architectural style: Second Empire, Tudor Revival, Other, Victorian Eclectic
- NRHP reference No.: 84000353
- Added to NRHP: November 1, 1984

The West Sixth Street Historic District is a national historic district that is located in Erie, Erie County, Pennsylvania.

It was added to the National Register of Historic Places in 1984.

== History and architectural features ==
This district encompasses one hundred contributing buildings that were built between 1821 and 1930, with most built after 1883. They are primarily high-style residences that were erected along "Millionaires Row." Designed in a variety of popular architectural styles, including Eclectic Victorian, Second Empire, and Tudor Revival, notable non-residential buildings include the Erie County Courthouse. Also located in the district but separately listed are the Charles Manning Reed Mansion, the John Hill House and the Watson-Curtze Mansion.
