= John Hill House =

Historic house in Pennsylvania, United States

- U.S. National Register of Historic Places
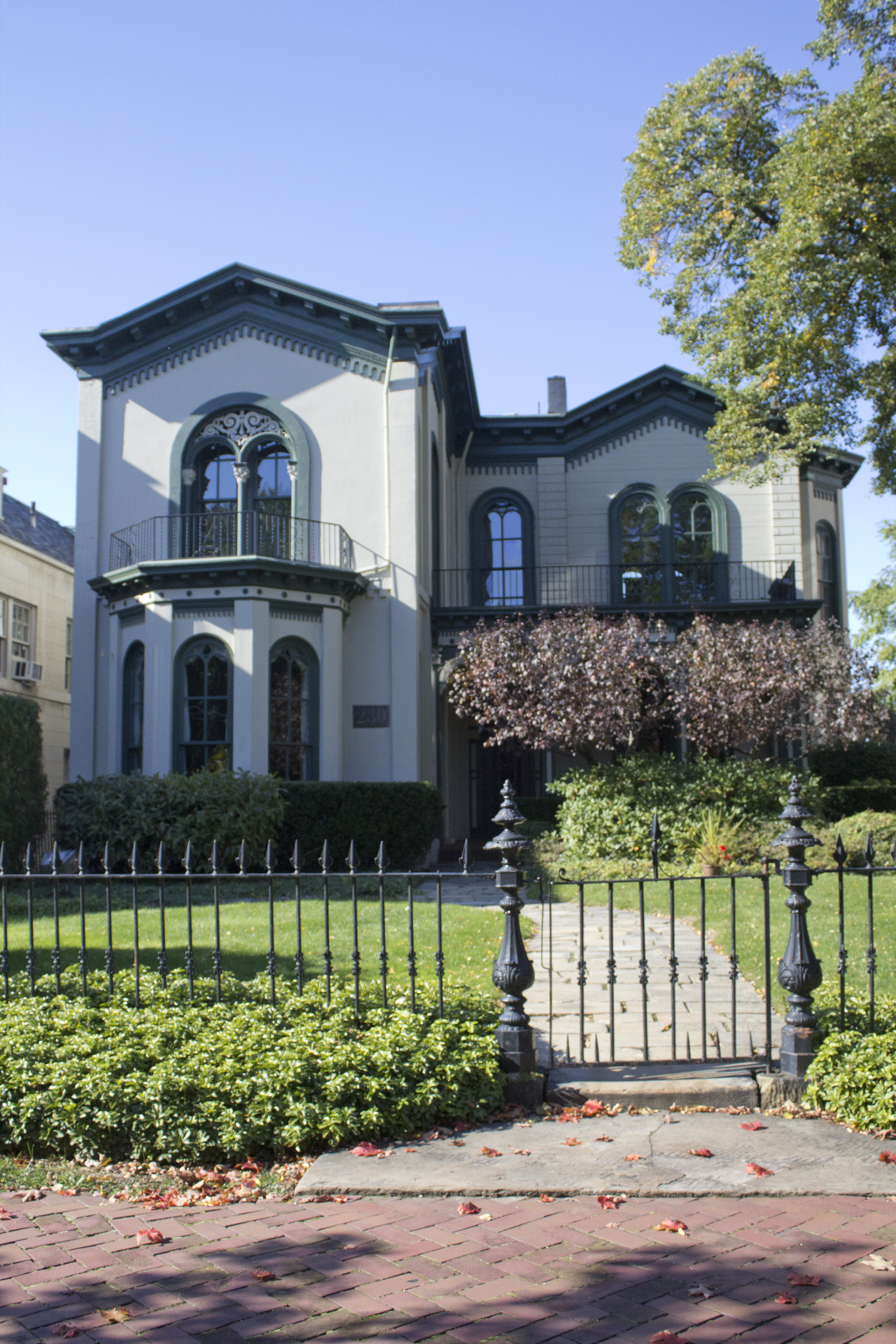

- Location within Pennsylvania Location within the United States
- Location: 230 W. 6th St., Erie, Pennsylvania
- Coordinates: 42°7′40″N 80°5′26″W
- Area: 0.3 acres (0.12 ha)
- Built: 1836, 1850s, 1890s
- Built by: John Hill, et al.
- Architectural style: Greek Revival, Other, Italian Villa
- NRHP reference No.: 79002224
- Added to NRHP: December 17, 1979

The John Hill House is an historic home that is located in Erie, Erie County, Pennsylvania, United States.

Located in the West Sixth Street Historic District, it was added to the National Register of Historic Places in 1979.

== History and architectural features ==
The original section of this historic structure was built circa 1836, with the south and east wings added during the 1850s. A two-story brick coach house and servants' quarters were added to the property after 1891, and the original house was connected to the main dwelling with the expansion of the rear ell. The main dwelling was created in a transitional Greek Revival/Italian Villa "picturesque" style, and features round-headed and hooded windows, prominent brackets, balconies, porches, and window bays. It is faced with scored poured concrete and clapboard and topped with a gable roof.
