= Presque Isle Water Taxi =

Coordinates: 42.13777°N 80.09032°W

- Locale: Erie, Pennsylvania; United States
- Waterway: Presque Isle Bay
- Transit type: Water taxi
- Operator: Erie–Western Pennsylvania Port Authority
- Began operation: 1999
- No. of lines: 1
- No. of vessels: 3

The Presque Isle Water Taxi, sometimes referred to as the Aquabus, is a water taxi service operated by the Erie–Western Pennsylvania Port Authority (EWPPA) on Presque Isle Bay in Erie, Pennsylvania. The water taxi departs from Dobbins Landing in downtown Erie and travels to the Waterworks in Presque Isle State Park, with a stopover at Liberty Park.

== History ==
In 1997, the Waterworks Ferry Dock in Presque Isle State Park received a $1.1 million renovation and dredging to reverse decades of deterioration. Water taxi service between the Waterworks and downtown Erie began on June 7, 1997 with the introduction of the Presque Isle Express—a 40-foot (10 m), 36-passenger pontoon boat. The Presque Isle Express ran for two years until the Erie–Western Pennsylvania Port Authority purchased two ferry boats in 1999. The Port Authority was appropriated $800,000 from the federal government by the Transportation Equity Act for the 21st Century (TEA-21) for the acquisition. The service was originally expected to have three stops along the Erie bayfront and two on Presque Isle. The twin 40-foot (12 m), fiberglass boats were named Aquabus I and Aquabus II; a third vessel was procured in 2001 and christened the Canadian Sailor. Though similar to the Aquabuses, the Canadian Sailor has a capacity of 42 passengers, an enclosed seating area, and the ability to travel out of the sheltered confines of Presque Isle Bay and into Lake Erie. The Canadian Sailor made trips from Erie to Barcelona, New York in 2002 and was part of a proposal to operate a ferry route between Erie and Canada. In 2011, the Canadian Sailor was the subject of a short-term lease to Buffalo Sailing Adventures to trial a ferry service in Buffalo, New York.

== Current operations ==
The Presque Isle Water Taxi departs from Dobbins Landing, at the end of State Street, on the hour. The water taxi stops in Liberty Park before reaching its final destination of Presque Isle State Park—total time for a roundtrip takes 50 minutes. It usually makes eight trips a day, seven days a week during the summer months with weather permitting as the water taxi does not run in rain and windy conditions.

== Sources ==
- Kinal, Brian (June 5, 1997). "Water taxi service to begin this weekend at renovated Waterworks ferry dock". Erie Daily Times. pp. 1A, 11A.
