= Erie County Community College =

College in Erie, Pennsylvania, U.S.

- Type: Public community college
- President: Chris Gray
- Location: Erie, Pennsylvania, United States; 42.1072°N 80.1366°W
- Website: www.ec3pa.edu

Erie County Community College is a public community college in Erie, Pennsylvania.

== History ==
Locals in Erie County established a nonprofit called Empower Erie in 2016 to explore the possibility of opening a community college in the region. The group included co-founder Ron DiNicola, who would eventually serve as the first Chair of the Board of Trustees, and advocated for this goal for about seven years. The college, nicknamed EC3, opened in Fall 2021 with 231 students using rented classrooms in a private high school. While the college waited for the results of its accreditation application, students who were residents in Erie County received free tuition thanks to federal COVID relief funds.

The Middle States Commission on Higher Education acknowledged the institution's application for accreditation in November 2024 in anticipation of an on-site evaluation in the 2026-2027 academic year.
