= USS Lake Erie =

USS Lake Erie may refer to the following ships operated by the United States Navy:

- USS Lake Erie (1917), a former cargo ship for the Navy from 1917 until she was sunk during an accident in 1919.
- USS Lake Erie (CG-70), was a Ticonderoga-class cruiser.

== See also ==
- USS Erie for other ships named after Lake Erie
