= Saint Vincent Health System =

- Highmark's Allegheny Health Network; Cleveland Clinic
- Location within Pennsylvania

Geography
- Location: Erie, Pennsylvania, USA
- Coordinates: 42.111086°N 80.079766°W

Organisation
- Care system: Private
- Type: Academic tertiary care

History
- Founded: 1875

Links
- Website: www.saintvincenthealth.com

Saint Vincent Health System, commonly known as simply St. Vincent's, is medical facility located in Erie, Pennsylvania. It is one of the largest employers in the Erie region. The complex features several large buildings, including a heart attack heart care unit.
