= Bicentennial Tower =

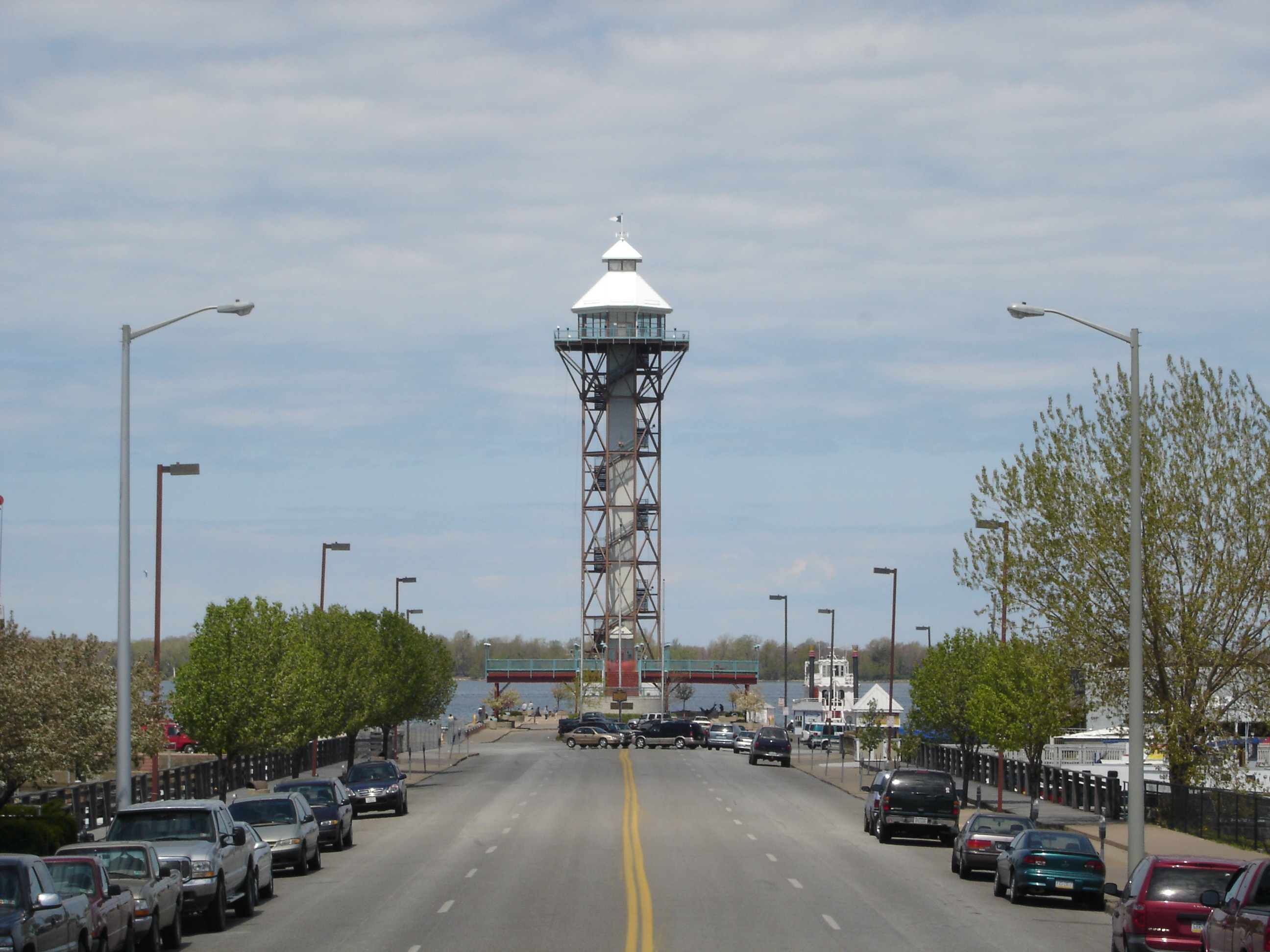
- The Bicentennial Tower looking towards the bay on State Street
- Interactive map of the Bicentennial Tower area

General information
- Type: Observation Tower
- Location: Dobbins Landing, Erie, Pennsylvania, United States, 1 State Street, Erie, PA, 16507
- Coordinates: 42°8′20″N 80°5′30″W
- Construction started: December 26, 1995
- Completed: October 19, 1996
- Opening: October 1996
- Cost: $2.1 million (equivalent to $4.31 million in 2025)
- Owner: Erie–Western Pennsylvania Port Authority

Height
- Antenna spire: 187 feet (57 m)
- Top floor: 137 feet (42 m)

Technical details
- Lifts/elevators: 1

Design and construction
- Architects: Weber Murphy Fox, Inc.
- Main contractor: Perry Construction Group, Inc

The Bicentennial Tower is an American observation tower that is located in Erie, Pennsylvania and features panoramic views of Lake Erie, Presque Isle State Park, and downtown Erie.

== History and architectural features ==
The tower was built in 1995 to commemorate the city's bicentennial year, 1996, and is located at the end of State Street on Dobbins Landing.

This historic structure is 187 feet (57 m) tall and has two observation decks.

A portion of the area around the tower was decorated with bricks engraved with the names and messages of individuals and groups that donated money in support of various community-benefit projects, including the tower's construction.

On November 11, 1996, a time capsule to be opened in 2095 was buried at the base of the tower.
