= Bayfront Convention Center =

- Interactive map of Bayfront Convention Center
- Location: 1 Sassafras Pier; Erie, PA 16507
- Coordinates: 42°8′14″N 80°5′39″W
- Owner: Erie County Convention Center Authority
- Capacity: 1,929 (Grand Ballroom); 4,000 (Great Hall)

Construction
- Opened: August 3, 2007

The Bayfront Convention Center is a convention center complex located in Erie, Pennsylvania. The center, which has views of Presque Isle Bay from three sides, includes a 28,800-square-foot (2,680 m^{2}) Great Hall with a seating capacity of 4,500, and a 13,500-square-foot (1,250 m^{2}) Grand Ballroom. The attached hotels are a Sheraton and Courtyard by Marriott The center held an open house beginning on August 3, 2007. Local promotion continued with public tours during the annual Celebrate Erie festival 17–19 August 2007. The attached hotel opened on April 10, 2008.

Construction manager, Barton Malow completed the construction of this project which won the 2008 Build America Award from the Associated General Contractors of America.

== General Managers ==
- Kevin R. Molloy, June 3, 2002 – May 11, 2008
- Jeff Esposito, May 12, 2008 – present
