= USS Erie =

USS Erie may refer to the following ships of the United States Navy:

- USS Erie (1813), a sloop-of-war, launched in 1813 and served until 1850
- USS Erie was the initial name of a collier launched in 1908 and converted to the repair ship USS Vestal (AR-4) in 1913
- USS Erie (PG-50), a gunboat launched in 1936 and sunk in 1942

== See also ==
- USS Lake Erie
