= List of city parks of Erie, Pennsylvania =

This is a list of the city parks and playgrounds of Erie, Pennsylvania. Those annotated with a ward affiliation are "officially named, designated, established, and located as public parks, public parks and playgrounds, and public playgrounds of the city." Also included here are selected parks operated by the Erie City School District and nearby Millcreek and Harborcreek townships. Erie County no longer operates parks, having passed all of its holdings to local governments.

== Statistics and rankings ==
The Erie Times-News discussed the city parks in their entirety in "City Boasts Dozens of Parks" on 4 June 2000. The city has 56 city parks, which includes:

- 3 golf courses
- 10 undeveloped parks (Roma Park, Woodlawn Park)
- 12 passive parks, manicured but lacking recreational equipment (Perry Square, Gridley Park)
- 28 active parks, with playgrounds and/or sports facilities
  - 12 ballfields (3 at 21st and Bauer Sts)
  - 19½ basketball courts (4 at Burton Park)
  - 14 tennis courts (6 at Frontier Park)
  - 1 skate park (Columbus Park)

The same article ranked the parks for various characteristics:

- Largest: Glenwood
- Smallest: 19th and Wayne, and Euclid Park, each only 1/3 acre
- Most popular: Glenwood Park, Frontier Park, Walczak Park, and Rodger Young Park
- Hidden jewel: E 41st and Brewer has unique playground equipment
- Underappreciated: Hillside, McKinley, Columbus, Lighthouse, and Barbara Nitkiewicz Parks
- Best playgrounds: Glenwood, Burton, Rodger Young, and Liberty Parks
- Prettiest views: Chautauqua and Branch Parks have nice views of Lake Erie; Walczak Park has a panoramic view of city and lake; and Frontier Park has the arboretum.

== Public partnerships ==
The City of Erie coordinates management of a number of city parks with commercial and public stakeholders interested in green space and what it means for quality of life and the economy. Major parks like Frontier Park and Perry Square have advocacy groups with formal relationships linking the city, the public, and corporate sponsors. Other parks, like McClelland Park, Washington Park, and Woodland Avenue Park are supported by neighborhood groups that seek development funds and advocate for their local community parkland. The mayor is planning a formal adopt-a-park program to recognize all non-governmental efforts to maintain city parks. The city also integrates city park improvements into city development projects, such as the major renovation underway involving Griswold Park near Union Station.

== List of parks ==
- Attorney Richard D. Agresti Baseball Field at Victory Playground is located at West 13th Street and Lincoln, nestled near the Interstate 79 interchange. It was developed by the city in 2003. It has a small playground, covered picnic area, and parking for about forty vehicles.(Ward 3) (See Victory Park)

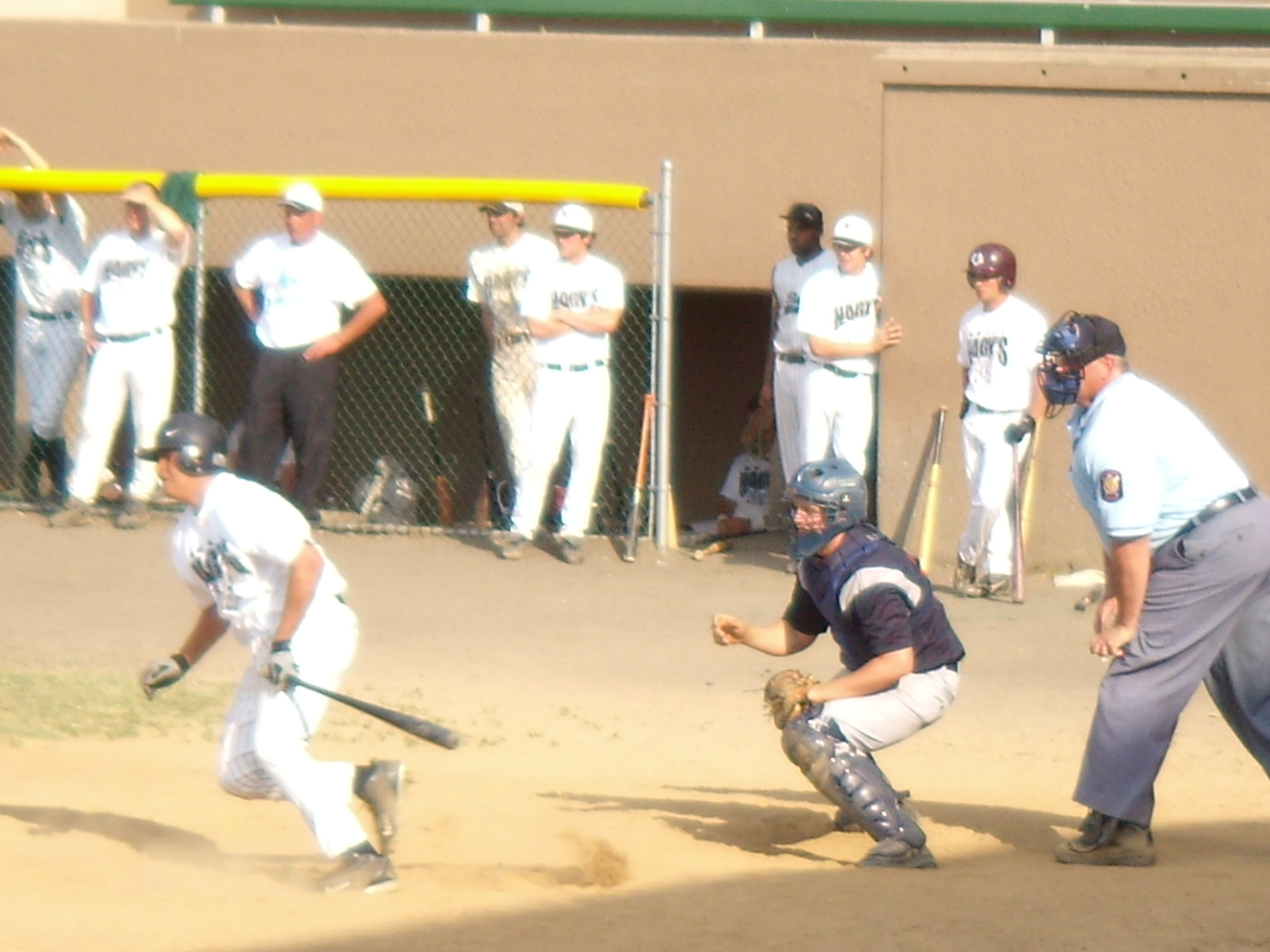
Baseball at Ainsworth Field

- Ainsworth Field is a baseball stadium located between West 22nd Street on the north, West 24th Street on the south, Cranberry Street on the east, and Washington Place on the west. It is on the grounds of Roosevelt Middle School. It is the former home of Erie minor league baseball, having been replaced by UPMC Park in 1995.

The Ainsworth Athletic Field was dedicated on 25 August 1947 in honor of J. C. Ainsworth "in appreciation of his outstanding accomplishments as civic leader, physical director, friend, and counselor of the youth of this community." It was rededicated in 1980 by the Erie City School District, which continues to provide funding for the stadium. Hallgren, Restifo, and Loop were the architects for the 1980 renovations, while Eriez Construction was the general contractor.

- Allen-Hetico Memorial Field. (see Bayview Park)
- Ted Amendola Memorial Field is located just south of the Bayfront Parkway at Front Street and Wallace. The field is located in Wallace Playground. (Ward 1)
- Asbury Farm Community Park is a recreational park located on the west side of Asbury Road, just south of West 38th Street in the Asbury section of southwestern Millcreek Township. It contains four tennis courts, a baseball field, sand volleyball, a playground, and a large covered picnic area. It is operated by Millcreek Township.

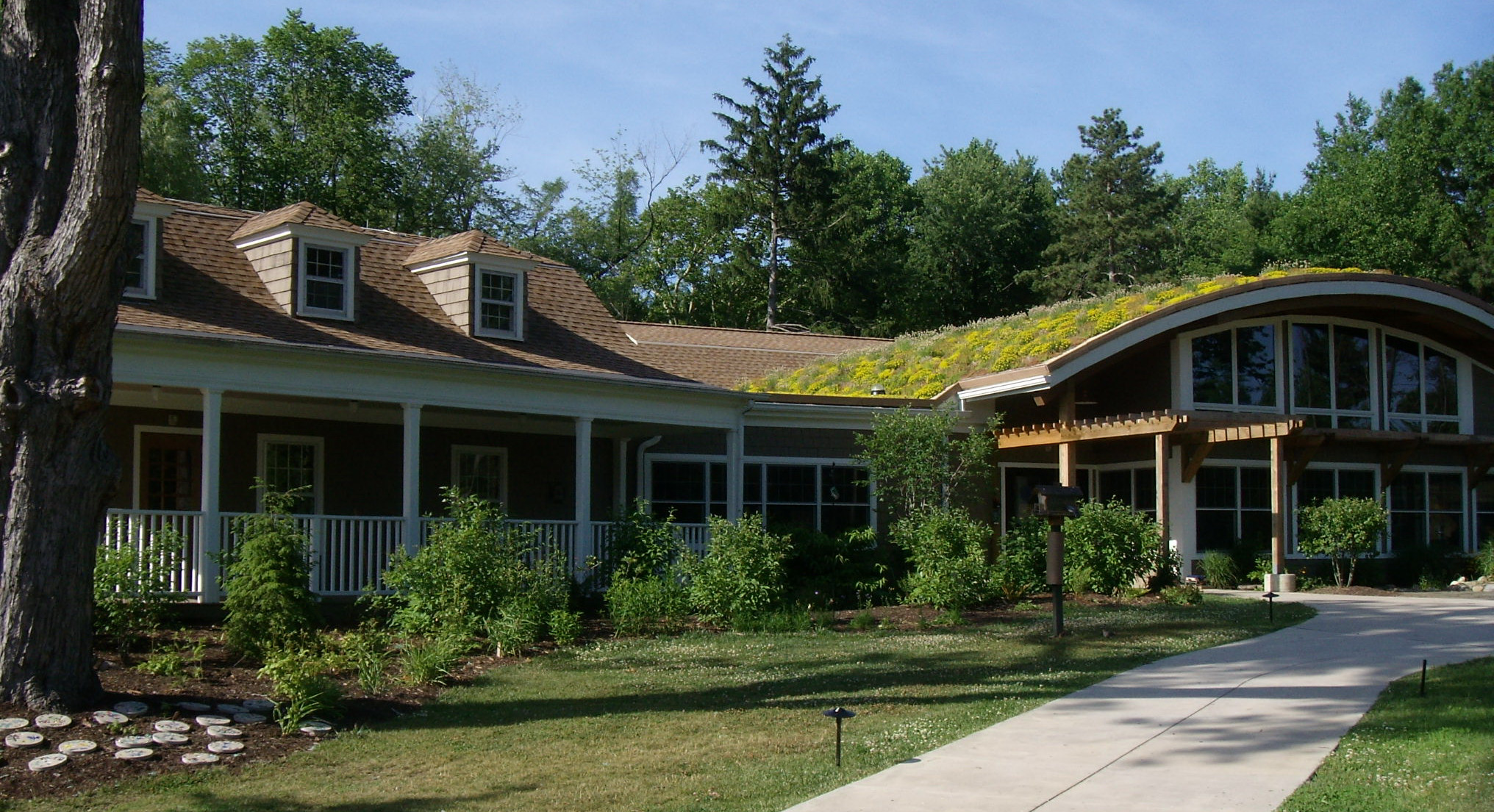
Asbury Woods Nature Center

- Asbury Woods Nature Center, once known as the Asbury Park Nature Center, is 200 acres (0.81 km^{2}) of parkland located on the east side of Asbury Road, just south of West 38th Street in the Asbury section of southwestern Millcreek Township. The center is a large facility, with educational interpretation areas, a pavilion, gardens and fountains, and a large parking area. On the west side of Asbury Road is the associated greenway, with several miles of hiking trails through young deciduous forest and pine woods, as well as trails and raised wooden walkways through bogs and marshes along Walnut Creek. Despite its proximity to Erie International Airport only a mile away, it is quiet and secluded. The nature center and greenway are operated by the Millcreek Township School District.
- Avalon Park is a small wooded park just outside the city limits in Millcreek Township. Established in 1926 and adopted by the neighborhood in 1992, the park is situated on the north side of West 6th Street between California Drive and Pittsburgh Avenue.
- Gregory Stuart Baldwin Park is a park located on West 26th Street between Berst Avenue and Geist Road in the Dock Junction section of the city. (Ward 6)

Basketball at Bayview Park

- Bayview Park is a park with a large open field, a basketball court, and a small playground with swings. It contains Pontiac Field, which was a softball field developed by the city in 1983 and renovated in 2020. The park borders the Bayfront Promenade has a wide view of Liberty Park and nearby marinas along West 2nd Street between Chestnut Street and Cherry Street, far above the Bayfront Parkway and Lake Erie. Since 2017, renovations have been promoted by Our West Bayfront, including a splash pad, upgrades to the softball field, and an 'Erie' wordmark sign. (Ward 4)
- Belle Valley Park is located in Millcreek Township.
- Roman Blaszczyk Field is a baseball field developed by the city in 1983. It is located south of East 12th Street between Wayne Street and the Bayfront Connector. The field is located within Kosciuszko Park in honor of Tadeusz Kościuszko. (Ward 2)
- George "Pat" Brabender Memorial Park is a baseball field developed by the city in 1983. It is located south of West 21st Street, north of West 23rd Street, east of Baur Avenue, and west of Emerson Avenue in the Dock Junction section of the city. (Ward 6)
- Jim Brutcher Field. (see Pulaski Park)
- Burton Park is an unmarked park and playground located to the south of East 38th Street and north of Pine Avenue in the Pleasant Heights neighborhood of Erie. It contains tennis courts, basketball courts, and a large lawn. (Ward 5)
- Woodlawn Avenue Park is a small park located on Woodlawn Avenue and Cameron Road, located in the Burton neighborhood just northeast of the Bayfront Connector and west of the Erie Industrial Park. (Ward 5)
- Cassidy Park is a 22-acre (89,000 m^{2}) passive recreation park with a nature trail, it is located right on Walnut Creek off of Zimmerly Road. The township purchased the land, which was once known as the Cassidy Campground, in December 2006 for $316,500. The same company that developed Asbury Woods Nature Center, which is also along Walnut Creek, has been selected to develop Cassidy Park.
- Chautauqua Park is a small park located in the quiet Lakeside neighborhood of Erie on an elevated shoreline along Lake Erie. The park, which was developed in 1993, is located at the eastern end of Lakeside Drive. It has a covered picnic area and grill, as well as several benches from which one might enjoy the lake view. A utility road at the eastern edge of the park leads down to a stretch of beach, but a no-swimming sign is posted due to the city pumping station situated nearby. A root-stepped path down a sharp ravine on the western side of the park also leads to the waterfront. (Ward 1)
- Chestnut Street Park is located at Bayfront Parkway and Chestnut Street. The park has two boat launch ramps.
- Columbus Park is a small park off Cherry Street between West 15th Street and West 16th Street in the Little Italy neighborhood of the city. The park is named for Christopher Columbus. (Ward 3)

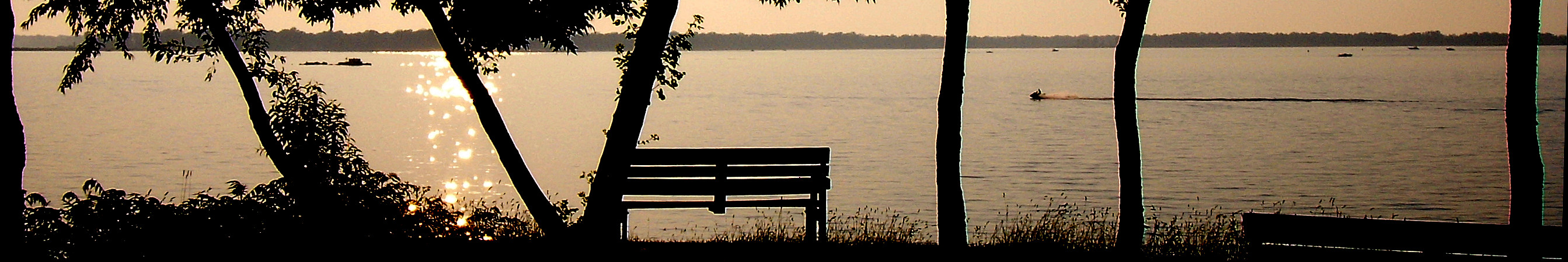
Cranch Park at dusk

- Cranch Park is a small, unmarked park located on Lakeside Drive near Cranch Avenue in the Lakeside Neighborhood of Erie. It has a grassy knoll, a rock outcropping down by the lake shore, and two park benches from which to enjoy the wonderful view. The park (and avenue) are likely named in memory of Edward Cranch, MD (16 October 1851 - 20 May 1920), a prominent Erie homeopath. (Ward 1)
- Elk Creek Access is a small park along the west bank of Elk Creek in northwestern Girard Township. Popular for its steelhead fishing, the park is situated between Pennsylvania Route 5 on the south and Lake Erie on the north. The Pennsylvania Department of Conservation and Natural Resources proposed to buy the 81-acre (330,000 m^{2}) parcel in 2007 from Girard for $400,000 in order to join it to contiguous Erie Bluffs State Park, which has been the park's western neighbor since June 2004.
- Erie Bluffs State Park is a 540-acre (2.2 km^{2}) Pennsylvania state park with one mile (1.6 km) of undeveloped Lake Erie shoreline in Girard Township and Springfield Township. It has 90-foot (27 m) bluffs with deep forest, wetlands, archaeologic sites, and picturesque views of the lake. It is located on Pennsylvania Route 5, just west of Elk Creek Access in western Girard, about 12 miles (19 km) west of Erie. The park, established by the governor on 4 June 2004, was acquired in December 2003 from Reliant Energy and is being managed by officials stationed at Presque Isle State Park. Erie Bluffs is popular with local hikers and bird watchers but after nearly five years is as yet relatively unknown to the general public due to public access limitations. Parking for 24 vehicles and an informational kiosk have been provided through grants from the state, and a new sign may finally be installed in 2009. More elaborate plans for the park, including additional parking, a fishing pier, and a Pennsylvania Department of Conservation and Natural Resources proposal to buy the neighboring 81-acre (330,000 m^{2}) Elk Creek Access from Girard Township for $400,000, could take years to come to fruition.
- Euclid Park is a small park located along the eastern shoreline of Lake Erie. (Ward 1)
- Larry Fabrizi Park was dedicated in 2005. It was formerly called Cloverdale Park. It is a small grassy park located just south of West 26th Street at Harvard Boulevard. Mr. Fabrizi was an elected District Justice in the city of Erie for 31 years, serving up until his death in 1992.(Ward 6)
- Franklin Park is an unmarked playground off East 10th Street at Marne Road in northeastern Erie. This treed park includes a baseball field. (Ward 1)

Friendship Park

- Friendship Park is an urban park located north of East 14th Street near Reed Street, where a woodchip path and some yellow paint mask the railroad tracks that once led to a coal yard on the property. The signed park, which contains flower gardens and several tall birdhouses to attract song birds, has a smart split-rail fence surrounding the property and a number of park benches from which to enjoy the scene. A community project, the park was developed as part of the US government's Community Capacity Development Office's Weed and Seed program.

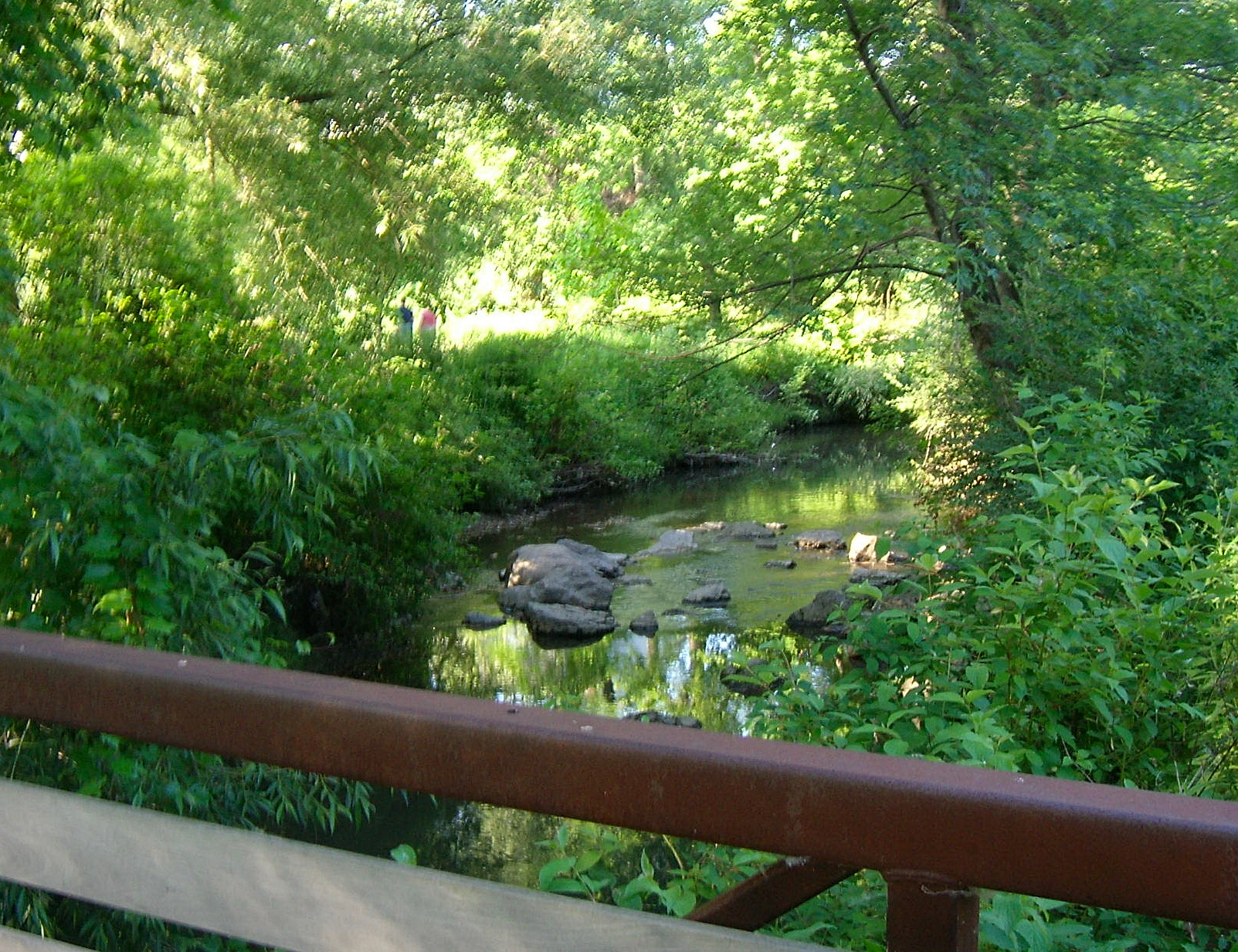
West branch of Cascade Creek babbles through Frontier Park

- Frontier Park is one of the more significant of Erie's city parks, with many recreational and educational uses. The park is located on 33 acres (130,000 m^{2}) of land along the west side of the Bayfront Parkway between West 6th Street and West 8th Street in the Frontier neighborhood in northwestern Erie. This community park was developed in 1974.

Children playing soccer on one of the many fields at Frontier Park

Half a dozen fields are available for children's soccer leagues, picnicking, and other activities. Six lit tennis courts and a children's playground are enjoyed along West 6th Street, where off-street parking holds approximately two dozen vehicles. Paved walks make a circuit of the park and include two crossings of the west branch of Cascade Creek. Joggers, bikers, and pedestrians on these paths can explore both flat and hilly terrain, lawn areas and reedy swamps, and a deep woods tree canopy and open spaces. A bike path connects Frontier Park to the Bayfront bikeway. Plans are afoot for an ice rink.

The Lake Erie Arboretum at Frontier Park (LEAF) was dedicated on 8 September 2001, after four years of local planning, fund raising, and planting. The LEAF program includes over 225 species of trees in an arboretum, what organizers nickname a tree museum. Dan Dahlkemper, owner of Dahlkemper Landscape Architects and Contractors, was the landscape architect for the project. An amphitheater with four stony rows of seating for approximately 75 persons is embedded in a wooded hillside not far from West 6th Street. The amphitheater is called the Patricia McCain Outdoor Classroom. The Labyrinth at LEAF was added to the park in 2005. (Ward 4)

- Garden Heights Park is located at East 40th Street and Brewer in the Garden Heights neighborhood of the southeast corner of the city. (Ward 5)
- Garden Park is a small park at Sassafras Street and Norman Way, located just east of Glenwood Park in an alleyway off of West 35th Street in the Glenwood Heights neighborhood of the city. (Ward 5)
- Glenwood Park is a significant park in Erie. The park is accessible from Glenwood Park Avenue, along both sides of which it meanders north and south between West 30th Street and West Grandview Boulevard in the Glenwood neighborhood of the city. West 38th Street crosses the park east and west from a point just east of Cherry Street. The main entrance to the Erie Zoo, Flo Fabrizo Ice Center, and Kuschinski Family Horseshoe Courts is found at Shunpike Road off West 38th Street. The Joseph Martin Golf Club is in the southwest corner of the park. Magyar Park, which was relocated in 2006 to the northwest corner of West 38th Street and Glenwood Park Avenue, contains a monument to the Hungarian Revolution of 1956. (Ward 5)

Gridley monument

- Gridley Park is named for Charles Vernon Gridley, who married and had a family while stationed in Erie in the early 1870s. Gridley served with distinction at the Battle of Mobile Bay during the American Civil War, and commanded the US Navy flagship Olympia at the Battle of Manila Bay during the Spanish–American War. A memorial erected by the city in 1913 in his honor stands in the small median running down the center of Liberty Street. The park is two full blocks wide, centered on Liberty Street, with Poplar Street on the east, Plum Street on the west, Park Avenue North on the north, and Park Avenue South on the south. Each block has a central garden hub, with sidewalks radiating out to the corners and lining the park at the street edge. Of particular interest: the plaque on Captain Gridley's memorial is etched on sheet metal recovered from the USS Maine. The park was initially called Cascade Park. (Ward 4)
- Griswold Park was dedicated on December 3, 1927, by Mayor Joseph Crane Williams. The park is located between Sassafras Street on the west, Peach Street on the east, West 13th Street on the north, and West 14th Street on the south. The park is situated near Union Station.

The park is named for Matthew Griswold, US Congressman and part owner of Erie's Selden and Griswold Manufacturing Company, famous maker of now-collectible cast iron skillets.

Griswold Plaza, which is on the northwest corner of the park, was dedicated in 1930 to Griswold's son, Matthew Griswold, Jr, who served as General Manager of the Erie works of the General Electric Company. The son, who headed the dedication of the neighboring park three years earlier, died in the interim and was memorialized by the city.

The park contains a cast-aluminum marker honoring the famous magician Harry Kellar, whose childhood home was situated near the park. The marker, placed by the Pennsylvania Historical and Museum Commission and the Erie Art Museum, was dedicated on May 9, 2008.

The Erie Redevelopment Authority plans a $51 million urban renewal project to construct 143 new residential units in the four blocks between State Street, Sassafras Street, West 12th Street, and West 14th Street, including up to fourteen town houses along Peach Street and West 13th Street, which each bisect the area. The one-acre park, a feature of the new neighborhood, will be extended and better lit as a result of the project, which is expected to begin in the summer of 2008. Gardens and water will be added, while a gazebo that has attracted the homeless will be relocated to a different park.

The park hosted the Erie Farmers' Market from its inception in 2004 through the summer of 2007, after which the market was moved to Perry Square due to the above construction. Regional farmers pay a one-time fee to sell their produce weekly during the summer months. (Ward 3)

- C. Francis Haggerty Park is a fairly large recreational park located along the eastern side of Route 79, with an entrance off West 32nd Street. It has a baseball field and basketball courts. It was developed by the city in 1973. Mr Haggerty was Erie's City Treasurer in 1969. Lohse Playground is found in this park at West 27th Street and Gerry Avenue. (Ward 6)
- East Erie Nature Trail Park is a park located in the Burton and Burton Heights neighborhoods of Erie. The entrance to the park is at East 26th Street & McCain Avenue and consists of a nature trail that takes you to either East 30th Street or East 26th Street & McClelland Avenue in the Diehl neighborhood of Erie.
- Harborcreek Community Park is a large park located south of Buffalo Road in Harborcreek Township. The park, which hosts Harborfest every July, is used extensively by local schools and community groups for year-round sporting and recreation.
- Bobby Harrison Field. (see Rodger Young Park)
- Headwaters Conservation Park is a 35-acre (140,000 m^{2}) park located on Wager Road near Interstate 90 and Pennsylvania Route 8 in Millcreek Township. One of two parks owned by Erie County, Headwaters consists of hardwood forest, wetlands, and grasslands at the source of Mill Creek. The scars of old logging skids and poor farming practices are in evidence. Since the county has no parks department, Headwaters is managed by the Erie County Conservation District. The park is the home of the Headwaters Conservation Park Natural Resource Center, a 10,000-square-foot (930 m^{2}) facility devoted to interpretation of environmental and conservation related to the Lake Erie Watershed. Seventy-five percent of the funding for the $493,000 resource center, which was dedicated in August 2002, was raised by private donations.
- Hillside Park is a playground established in October 1996. It can be accessed through an entrance along the east side of Old French Road. The park consists of the land between East 39th Street on the north and East Lakeview Boulevard on the south. The park is just west of Mercyhurst College. One of two baseball fields in this park is named in honor of local Negro leagues and Major League Baseball player Sam Jethroe. (Ward 5)
- Sam Jethroe Field. (see Hillside Park)
- Martin Luther King Jr. Park is a small park on the north side of West 4th Street near Chestnut Street. It is named for the civil rights activist, Martin Luther King Jr.
- Kosciuszko Park is a park located south of East 12th Street between Wayne Street and the Bayfront Connector. The park was named in honor of Tadeusz Kościuszko. Within the park is Roman Blaszczyk Field, a baseball field developed by the city in 1983. (Ward 2)
- Lake Erie Community Park is located in Lake City, Pennsylvania. Access to the park is from Pennsylvania Route 5, just west of Pennsylvania Route 18.

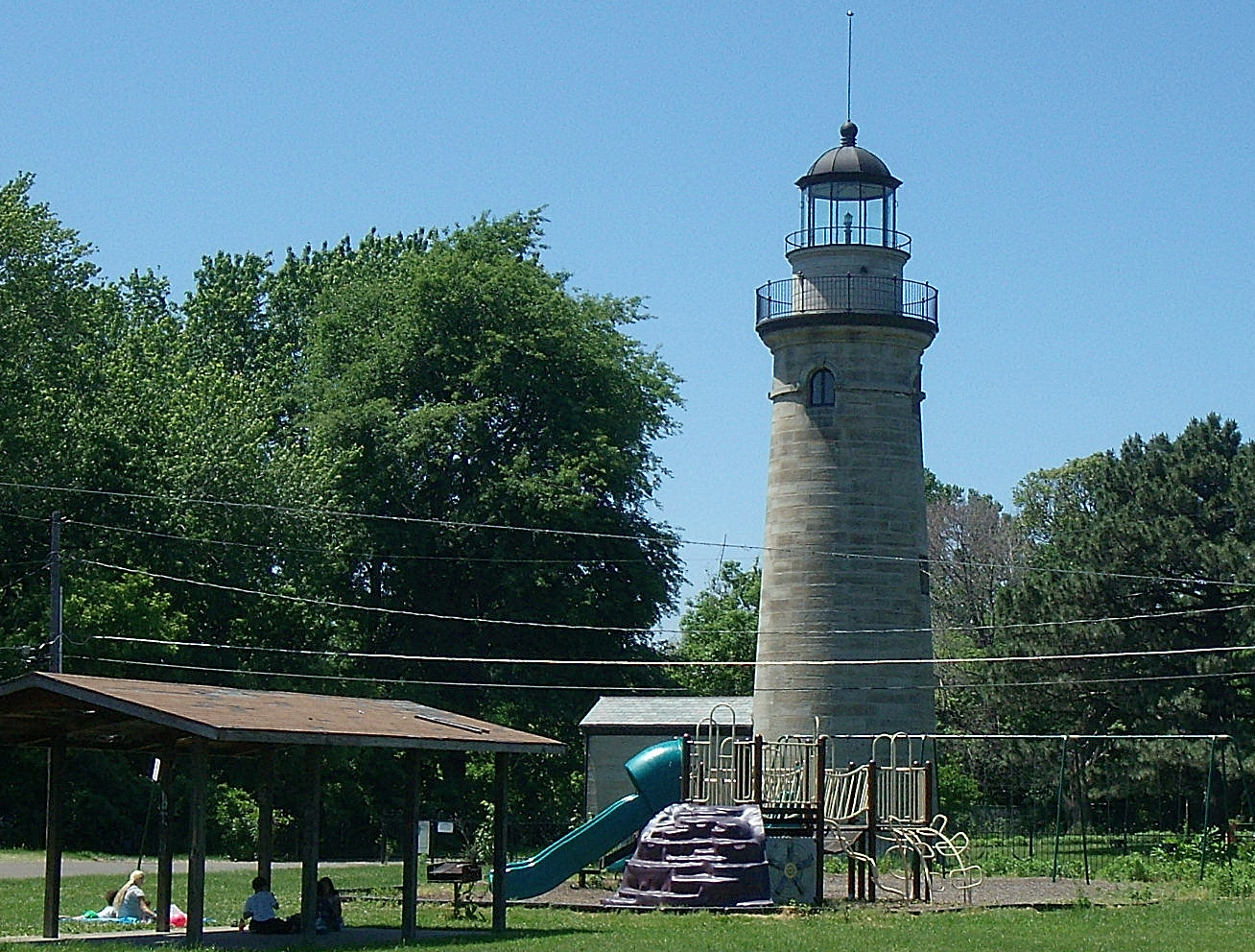
Erie Land Light and playground

- Lake Front Drive Park. (see Land Lighthouse Park)
- Lake Park is a small, unmarked grassy margin located in a quiet northeast Erie neighborhood off East 6th Street, along the shoreline of Lake Erie. It is situated between Lake Avenue on the east, Park Way on the west, and may cross Lakeside Drive into some undeveloped woodland that abuts Lake Erie. (Ward 1)
- Lakeside Park is a green space north of West 2nd Street between Peach Street and Sassafras Street.
- Land Lighthouse Park is a park along the shoreline of Lake Erie just east of Presque Isle peninsula. The Erie Land Light, Lake Front Drive Park, and McCarty Playground are all situated within this same location at the foot of Dunn Boulevard and Lighthouse Road, just off East Lake Road (Alternate Route 5). (Ward 1)

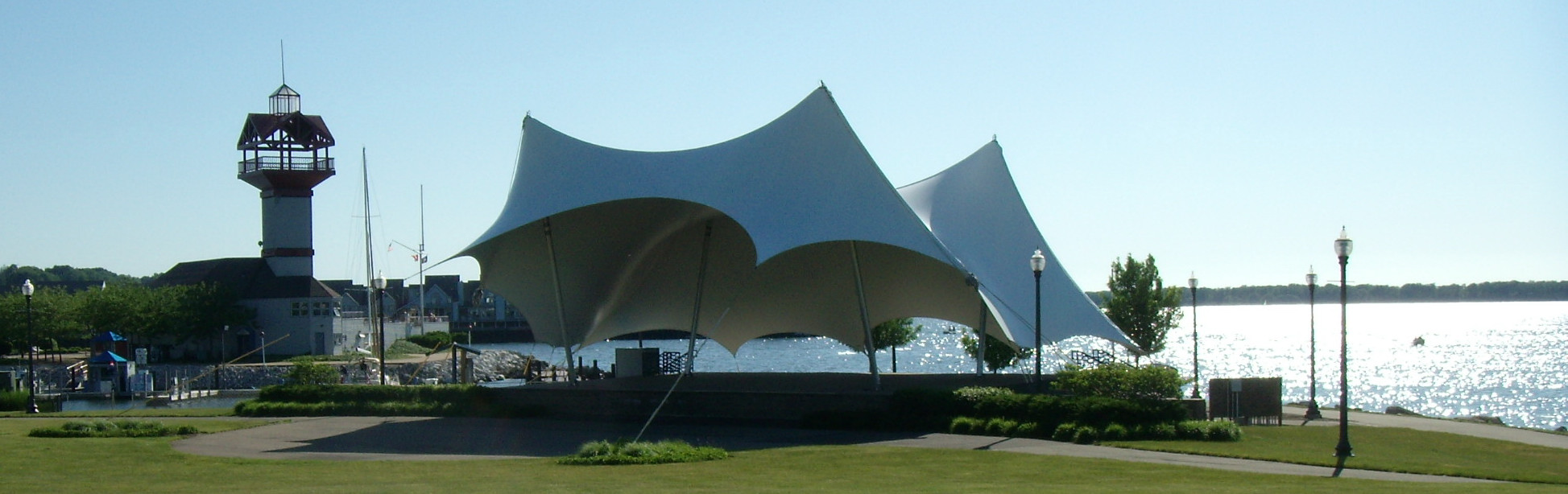
Burger King Amphitheater at Liberty Park

- Liberty Park is a community park located on Pier III, just off the Bayfront Parkway at the shore of Lake Erie. The park contains 8.5 acres (34,000 m^{2}) of public access walkways, playgrounds, and sand volleyball courts. The Burger King Amphitheater hosts a number of popular events within the park. Water taxis provide service to Presque Isle State Park. The park is adjacent to the Bay Harbor Marina.
- William McKinley Park is a park located at East 21st Street and East Avenue. The park, which is associated with the William McKinley Elementary School, contains basketball and tennis courts.
- Nate Levy Park, also known as Nate Levy - Jaycee Park, is a park located at East 2nd Street and Holland Street. The park contains a playground and tennis courts.
- Lohse Playground. (see C. Francis Haggerty Park)
- Magyar Park. (see Glenwood Park)
- McCarty Playground. (see Land Lighthouse Park)
- McClelland Park is located in the Eastlawn Hills & Diehl neighborhoods of Erie. It is situated to the east of McClelland Avenue and to the west of Bird Drive between East 26th Street on the north and East 31st Street on the south. The property was known locally as Old Maids' Hill. Its 56 acres (230,000 m^{2}) of land were purchased in the 1960s as thirteen individual parcels for use as a park or playground with approximately $56,000 in grant money from the Project 70 Act. The property is bisected south to north by a shale-bottomed stream known as McDannell Run. The southern half of the property is covered in a hardwood forest consisting of oak, cherry, and white birch. The northern portion has low, dense brush with the occasional hardwood sapling and thorn apple as well as the foundations of an abandoned building the origins of which remain unknown. The city has considered bond issues to capitalize development of the park, but no progress has been made to date. Several informal trails pass throughout the park.

The city was cited in 1990 and again in 1997 for dumping road sweeper waste on the property, in violation of the Project 70 Act, so an ordinance was added to the city code in 1997 prohibiting same. While the city no longer dumps in the park, some city residents use the park margins instead of city services to dispose of yard debris and old Christmas trees. In 2015, major renovations came to McClelland Park by adding a parking lot and turned the old gravel pit into a dog park. In 2016, nature trails were added and repaired as well as labeled more clearly. Then in 2020, a playground was added near the entrance of the park.
In May, 2021, The City of Erie announced for more renovations to be added to McClelland Park. The road that enters the park was renamed to McClelland Park Road and was also paved with tar, as it used to be a dirt road. More parking spaces were added as well as there is plans to add more trails and a boardwalk that goes over McDannell Run. The city also plans to add more picnic areas as well as more paved trails to connect to the east side roads off of Bird Drive in the Eastlawn Hills neighborhood of Erie.

- 19th and Wayne is a recreational area with basketball courts at East 19th Street and Wayne Street.
- Barbara Nitkiewicz Field is a small park with a grassy lawn, some ornamental trees and a small playground. It is located at West 3rd Street and Cascade Street, just south of where the Bayfront Parkway turns away from the bay. (Ward 4)
- Crush Park is described by the city as being located between West 27 Street and West 29th Street near Harvard Boulevard. It is presumably adjacent to Larry Fabrizi Park (above), but there are no indications of a park. The local newspaper puts it one block west of Harvard and five blocks long instead of two. The Erie Times-News describes it as "a narrow strip of land between Ellsworth Avenue and Hudson Street from West 27th to West 32nd Streets. It covers a sewer line, and it has largely been taken over by nearby property owners."
- Pebble Lake Playground is on the east side of Washington Avenue at West 26th Street. (Ward 6)
- Burger King Amphitheater. (see Liberty Park)
- Perry Square is a major downtown Erie park centered on State Street, with French Street on the east, Peach Street on the west, Park Row North on the north, and Park Row South on the south. A statue of Oliver Hazard Perry, hero of the War of 1812, stands in the park. Adjacent to the park are City Hall, the Federal Court House, the Erie County Courthouse, and the Erie History Center. A $358,000 upgrade of the park is scheduled for spring 2008 as part of the city's downtown revitalization program, which is being implemented by the Philadelphia consulting firm Kise Straw and Kolodner. (Wards 1 and 4)
- Presque Isle State Park, consisting of most of Presque Isle peninsula, is the largest park in the region. It supports a variety of recreational and educational activities for millions of visitors annually.
- Pulaski Park is a park and playground located north of East 12th Street between Brandes Street and Hess Avenue. It was named in honor of Casimir Pulaski, but no sign showing his name is visible. The park contains Jim Brutcher Field and Joseph Wronek Memorial Field, each developed by the city in 1983. Joseph Wronek is described on the park's scoreboard as a sportsman, veteran, and competitor. The park also contains a treed parkland and a playground with swings.(Ward 2)
- Ravine Park is a sizable but undeveloped park forming a wooded ravine surrounding Ravine Drive, just off Crescent Drive, in the Kahkwa section of northwest Erie. Ravine Drive, which passes along the bottom of the ravine and provides the only access to the parkland, serves primarily as a beautiful, secluded access road to the Erie Yacht Club and the numerous private residences at Ferncliff Beach. (Ward 4)
- Reservoir Park is located south of West Grandview Boulevard between Cherry Street and Hillcrest Avenue in the Glenwood section of the city.
- Roessler Park was developed by the city in 1973. It is located between East 15th Street on the north, the railroad tracks on the south, Wayne Street on the east, and Ash Street on the west. (accessible via Ash Street) The park contains a playground, covered picnic area, benches, and a grassy lawn.
- Roma Park is parkland that is currently undeveloped and neglected. It is frequently used as a dumping ground for trash; however, lately individuals independent of the Erie City government have been attempting to restore the park to a clean condition. It is between Zimmerman Road on the east, Roma Drive on the west, East 31st Street on the north, and East 35th Street on the south. Connell Elementary School, adjacent to the park on E 38th Street, has a large recreational area behind the school. (Ward 5)
- Ruby Schaaf Park is a park located south of West 19th Street on Myrtle Street in the Little Italy neighborhood. It contains a playground and basketball courts. It was formerly known as the Myrtle Street Playground. (Ward 6)
- William L Scott Park is a large park operated by Millcreek Township in its Tracydale North section. It was first developed by Erie County in December 1978 and passed to the control of the local township circa 2005. The park is situated just to the east of the entrance to Presque Isle State Park. The park is named for a prominent gentleman named William Lawrence Scott, who twice represented Erie to the U.S Congress and twice served as Erie's mayor. The park contains two baseball fields, a small playground, beach volleyball, and a picnic area. The Presque Isle Rotary Club carved out the Bay Trail hiking trail. The north end of the park contains a private BMX racing operation. The Sommerheim Park Archaeological District is located within the park.
- Shades Beach Park is a lake-side recreational area, beach, and marina north of Lake Road East in Harborcreek Township. Once part of the Erie County park system, control passed from the county to the township in the late 1990s. Federal, state, and county funding totaling $2.6 million provided a boat launch and other major improvements.
- Six Mile Creek Park is 450 acres (1.8 km^{2}) of undeveloped land surrounding Six-Mile Creek, situated just south of Interstate 90 in Harborcreek Township. Purchased from the state by Erie County with Project 70 Land Acquisition and Borrowing Act funds in the late 1960s, the park is the responsibility of the Erie County Department of Planning, which relies on the Erie County Conservation District to oversee the property. With state approval, the county could pass control of the park to Harborcreek, which operates a highly regarded parks department, if obligatory Project 70 public access modification costs can be absorbed by the state.
- South Pier is located at the northern tip of Port Access Road, just off the Bayfront Parkway where it meets the Bayfront Connector. The site offers a view of Presque Isle Bay, Lake Erie, and the channel between them; Presque Isle State Park, the US Coast Guard Station, and Perry Monument. Parking and picnic facilities are available. The Captain John E. Lampe Marina is a close walk. A paved walkway runs along the wooded eastern side of Port Access Road.

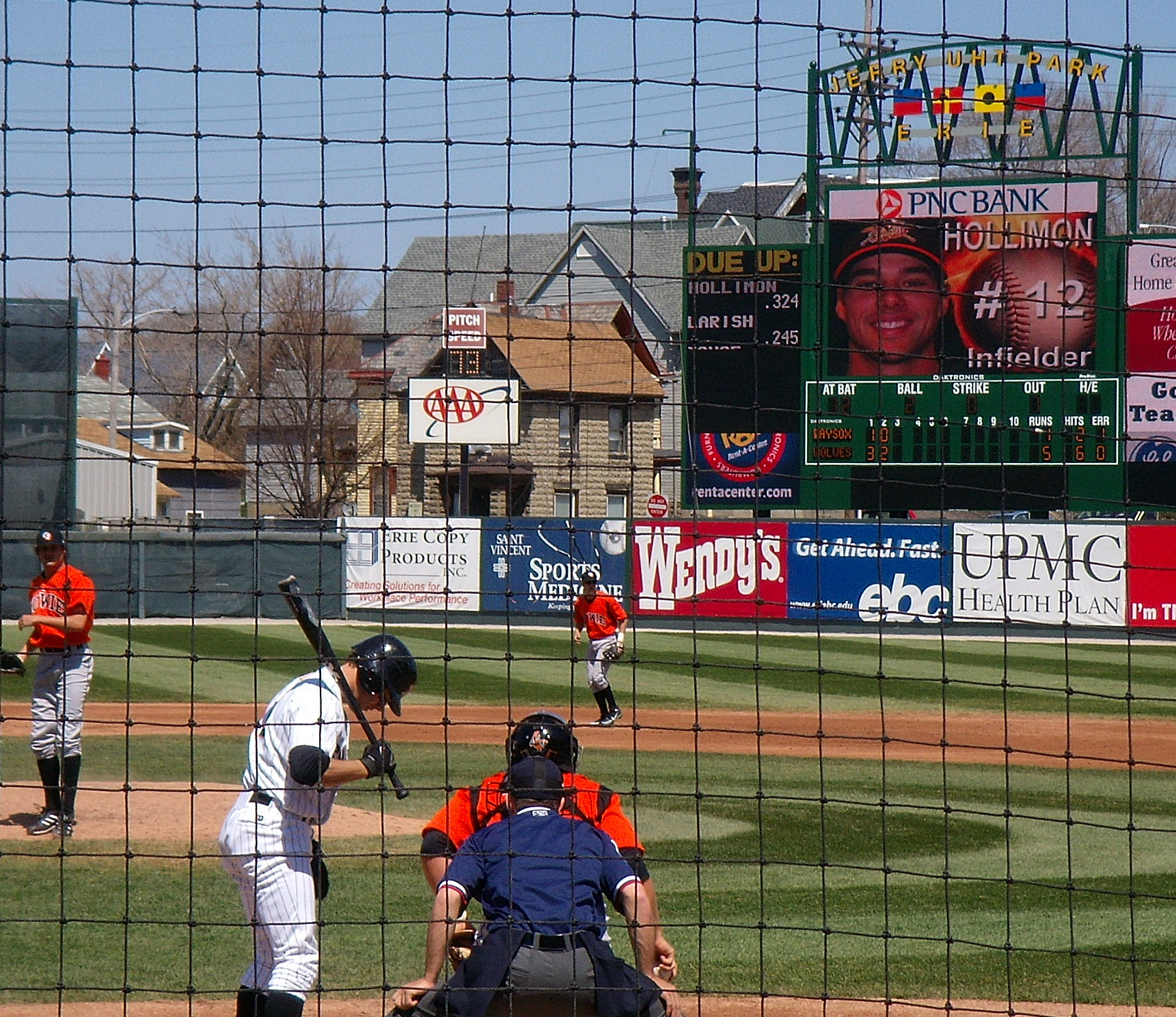
UPMC Park

- UPMC Park is a baseball stadium where the Erie SeaWolves minor league baseball team plays.
- Viaduct Playground is located at East 17th Street and Franklin Street, between Buffalo Road and the railroad tracks. (Ward 2)
- Victory Park is a small park just south of West 12th Street at the Interstate 79 interchange. (Ward 3) (see Agresti Baseball Field at Victory Playground)
- Joseph A Walczak, Sr. Park was developed by the city in 1974. It is located at the end of Alan Drive South off of Zimmerman Road in the Walczak Park neighborhood of southeastern Erie. Mr. Walczak was president of the city council in 1969. The park contains a baseball field with bleachers and dugouts, a playground, basketball courts, and a covered picnic area. (Ward 5)
- Wallace Playground is located just south of the Bayfront Parkway at Front Street and Wallace. It contains a playground, as well as soccer and softball facilities. The field is called the Ted Amendola Memorial Field. (Ward 1)
- Washington Park is a park located between Raspberry Street and Cascade Street and 23rd Street and 24th Street. (Ward 6)
- Wayne Park is a small square-style park located in the lower East Side of the City of Erie. It is named for Anthony Wayne, a general in the American Revolution. It saw renovation in 2018 with the installation of a new playground, donated by the Hamot Health Foundation. (Ward 1)
- West Grandview Park is located in Erie Heights in the southwest corner of the city, just east of Interstate 79. The headquarters of the Lord Corporation are situated adjacent to the park.
- Woodland Park is an undeveloped wooded park in the Woodland Park section of northwestern Erie. The park is situated along Grove Drive between Delaware and Lincoln, just north of the junction of Interstate 79 and West 12th Street. (Ward 3)
- Woodlawn Park is a small park located at West 32nd Street and Harvard Boulevard.
- Joseph Wronek Memorial Field. (see Pulaski Park)
- Rodger Young Park is a park located on both sides of Downing Avenue between Buffalo Road and the railroad tracks. This expansive park contains a football field, two softball fields, basketball courts, and a public pool. Bobby Harrison Field, the football/soccer field with stadium seating which was developed by the city in 2005. Renovations were proposed with ARPA funding by then-City Council member Michael Keys, with planning ongoing as of September 2024.
- Zuck Park is located on the east side of Zuck Road and north of West Grandview Boulevard in Millcreek Township. The park was deeded to Millcreek Township in 1988 by the city, which had closed the park due to liability insurance costs. Millcreek reopened the park in March 1989 after $14,000 in renovations.

== See also ==
- Parks Laid Out With Original Plans of City Make Erie Beautiful, Erie Dispatch, 31 December 1911
- Sure Sign of Winter, Erie Times, 20 August 1932
- City Proud of Parks, Erie Dispatch, 17 March 1935
- Quiet, Restful Zuck Park Monument to Two Men, ----, 4 March 1938
- Glenwood's Bridge Has Double Use, Erie Times, 31 August 1946
- Beautiful Parks For All to Enjoy, Erie Times News, 24 June 1973
