= Lake Erie Watershed (Pennsylvania) =

Coordinates: 42°00′N 80°08′W

Lake Erie Watershed is a major drainage catchment in northwestern Pennsylvania, United States, consisting of lands with direct runoff and sub-watersheds with waterways that flow into Lake Erie and Presque Isle Bay from Crawford and Erie counties, as well as from New York. The watershed is part of the Lake Erie Basin.

== Sub-units of the watershed ==
=== Averill Creek Sub-watershed ===
Averill Creek is also called 41.5 Mile Run.

=== Cemetery Run Sub-watershed ===
Cemetery Run begins north of E 38th near Millcreek proceeding through Roma Park before continuing to the lake by Lakeside Cemetery, with many portions running underground, due to development, or through culverts.

=== Crooked Creek Sub-watershed ===
Crooked Creek

=== Direct Runoff ===
Some Pennsylvania lands have surface runoff that drains directly into Lake Erie. 24 such stretches of land can be identified.

Erie International Airport is located in the largest of these direct runoff zones, west of the City of Erie, between Walnut Creek and Cascade Creek sub-watersheds. The airport's Master Plan includes a water quality section in its Environmental Baseline Study (Chapter 3, Section 3.07).

The master plan positions the airport in Lake Erie Watershed, 9,000 feet (2,700 m) north of Walnut Creek Sub-watershed, 12,000 feet (3,700 m) west of Cascade Creek Sub-watershed, and five miles (8 km) west of Mill Creek Sub-watershed, which is part of the Presque Isle Bay Watershed. The plan notes that Wilkins Run, a tributary (sic) that drains directly into Lake Erie, is situated 1,000 feet (300 m) west of the airport.

Storm drainage is identified in the master plan as the main potential water pollution danger. Construction and deicing operations require federal permits and extensive measures are taken to contain and process the runoff properly. A report detailing these measures is included at the end of the airport's master plan, entitled Airport Drainage Master Plan.

=== Duck Run Sub-watershed ===
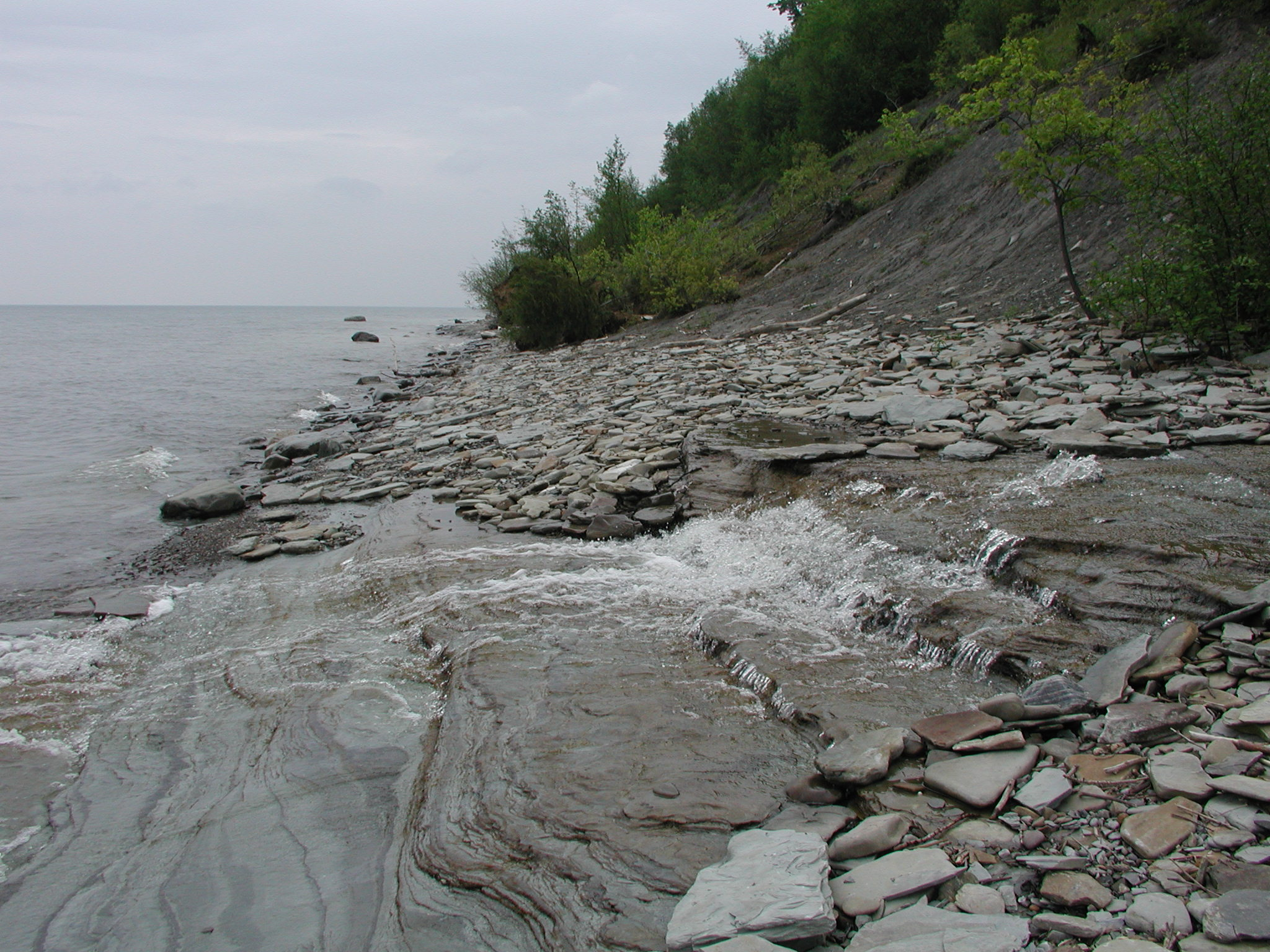
Mouth of Duck Run, Erie Bluffs State Park

Duck Run

=== Eightmile Creek Sub-watershed ===
Eightmile Creek (Pennsylvania)

=== Elk Creek Sub-watershed ===
This sub-watershed consists of Elk Creek and surrounding lands, including the northeastern quarter of Elk Creek Township, the northern two-thirds of Franklin Township, and much of central Girard Township in northwestern Erie County, Pennsylvania.

Elk Creek is one of three western Erie County tributaries thought to be raising E. coli counts off Lake Erie beaches at nearby Presque Isle State Park.

=== Fourmile Creek Sub-watershed ===
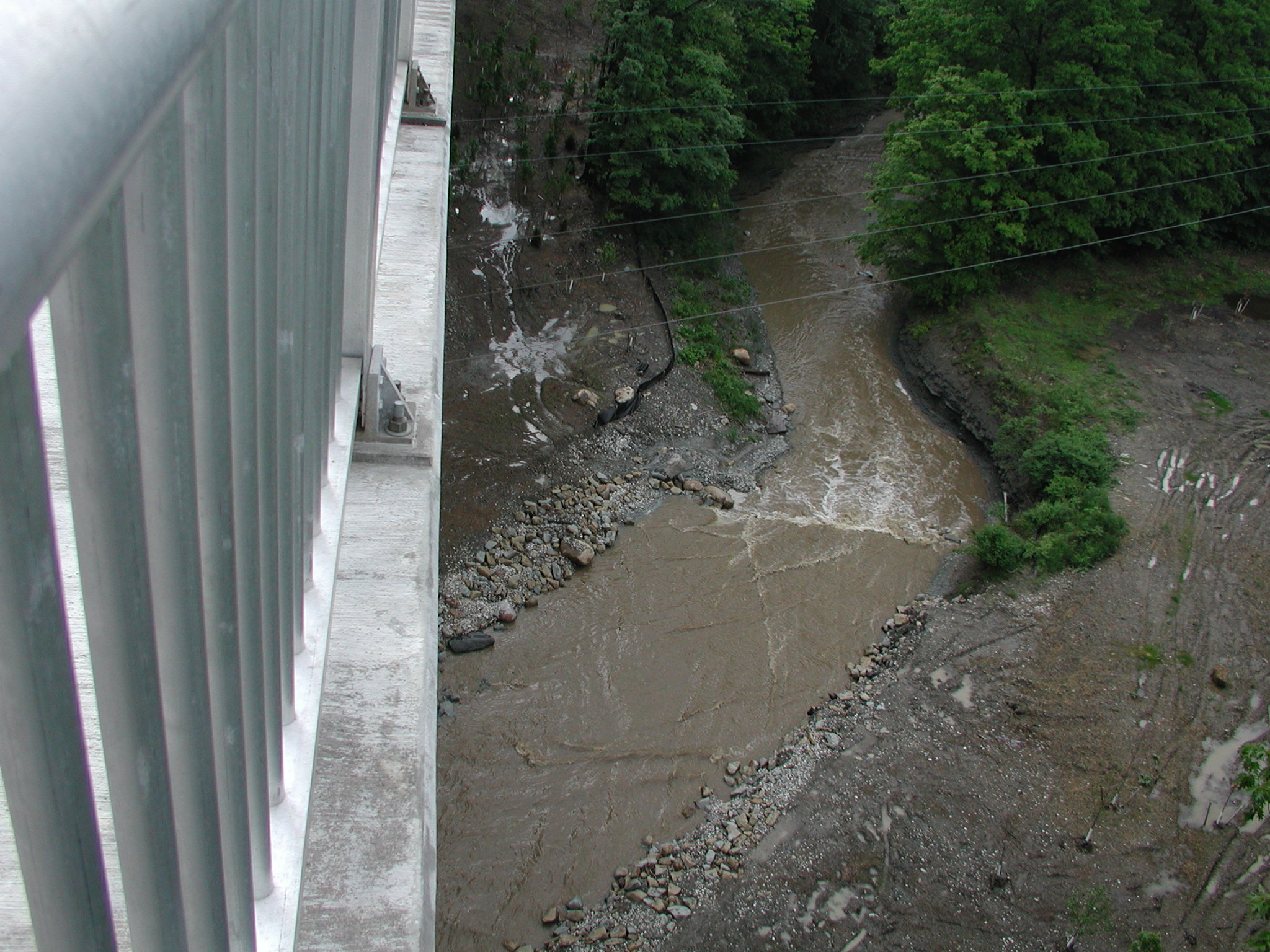
Four Mile Creek, Wintergreen Gorge Bridge

Fourmile Creek Sub-watershed consists of the 11.93-square-mile (30.9 km^{2}) drainage of the 8-mile-long (13 km) Fourmile Creek. The creek's mouth opens to Lake Erie about one-half mile north of Pennsylvania Route 5 at Water Street. It draws its name from its location four miles (6 km) east of the center of Erie, Pennsylvania. The watershed consists of portions of Greene, Harborcreek, and Lawrence Park townships, as well as Wesleyville, Pennsylvania. Fish migration improvement projects have included the destruction of two dams in 2007 and the planned construction of two fish ladders in 2008. Projects to stem sedimentation due to soil erosion were planned for 2008.

=== Godfrey Run Sub-watershed ===
Godfrey Run is also known as 11.5 Mile Run.

=== McDannell Run Sub-watershed ===
This sub-watershed consists of McDannell Run and the surrounding lands of the City of Erie. The sub-watershed crosses slightly into Millcreek Township. The run passes through McClelland Park, an undeveloped city park on the eastern side of the city.

=== Orchard Beach Run Sub-watershed ===
Orchard Beach Run is also called 39.9 Mile Run.

=== Presque Isle Bay Watershed ===
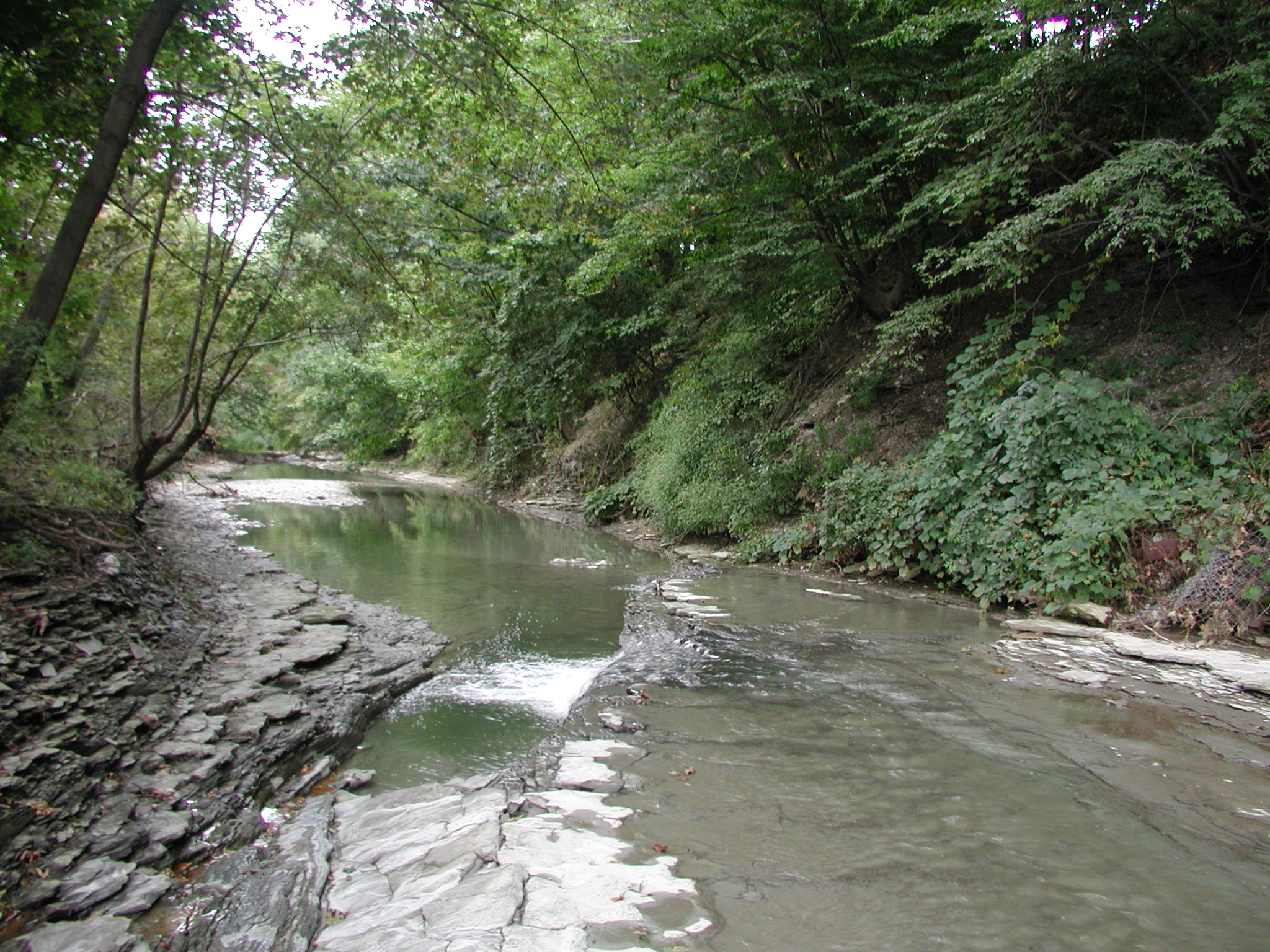
Mill Creek south of tube in City of Erie

This watershed, which covers 65 km^{2}, consists of lands in the City of Erie and two neighboring townships which surround three direct runoff zones, including Presque Isle State Park, and two sub-watersheds, which all feed into Presque Isle Bay. At its eastern extreme, the bay has a small channel that drains into Lake Erie. The Environmental Protection Agency (EPA) has designated this watershed a Great Lakes Areas of Concern (AoC). The land is 80% urbanized, with storm water often diverted, causing degradation of fish habitat and other problems. An assessment of fishes published in Northeastern Naturalist magazine in 2004 found that at least half of the stream fish assemblages tested were impaired by urbanization. The city focused its attention on this watershed as part of its effort to convert Erie from heavy industry to light industry and tourism.

- Cascade Creek Sub-watershed consists of Cascade Creek and surrounding lands in the City of Erie. The creek passes through Frontier Park on the northwestern side of the city. Cascade Street forms the eastern border of the sub-watershed. Nearby Gridley Park, in an adjacent direct runoff zone to the east, was named Cascade Park when the city was laid out in the late 18th century.
- Garrison Run Sub-watershed consists of Garrison Run and surrounding lands in the City of Erie. The sub-watershed begins just across the border in Millcreek Township. At the city, the sub-watershed is situated east of the Mercyhurst College campus eastward to Davison Road, with Mill Creek Sub-watershed to the west and 26.9 Mile Run Sub-watershed to the east. At US 20 the sub-watershed narrows to the area between Ash Street and Parade Street, with Mill Creek Sub-watershed to the west and a direct runoff zone to the east. The sub-watershed is mostly land-locked at the north, with a single outlet cutting through the base of Presque Isle Peninsula's eastern stub and feeding into the bay. A spring in the sub-watershed was unearthed and diverted during construction in 2007 of the Pennsylvania Soldiers' and Sailors' Home dementia and Alzheimer's unit at East 3rd Street between Ash Street and Reed Street.
- Mill Creek Sub-watershed consists of Mill Creek and surrounding lands in the City of Erie, Millcreek Township, Summit Township, and Greene Township. The creek passes through Glenwood Park, then enters a tube to pass under the city. When the creek passed along the surface through the city, it regularly caused seasonal flooding in Erie. In 1915, after a heavy storm, debris became wedged in a culvert, blocking a large amount of water upstream which, when released, caused a significant, destructive flood of downtown Erie. Residents called for flood controls, resulting in the construction of the Mill Creek Tube.

=== Purdue Creek Sub-watershed ===
Purdue Creek is also called 40.9 Mile Run.

=== Raccoon Creek Sub-watershed ===
Raccoon Creek

=== Sevenmile Creek Sub-watershed ===
Sevenmile Creek

=== 6.7 Mile Run Sub-watershed ===
6.7 Mile Run

=== Sixmile Creek Sub-watershed ===
Six Mile Creek in Six Mile Creek (Erie County) Park

Sixmile Creek

=== Sixteenmile Creek Sub-watershed ===
Sixteenmile Creek

=== 10.0 Mile Run Sub-watershed ===
10.0 Mile Run

=== 3.9 Mile Run Sub-watershed ===
3.9 Mile Run

=== 3.2 Mile Run Sub-watershed ===
3.2 Mile Run

=== Trout Run Sub-watershed ===
This sub-watershed consists of Trout Run and surrounding lands of northwestern and south central Fairview Township. The sub-watershed is situated primarily north of I-90. The sub-watershed touches across the Fairview border into McKean and Girard Townships.

Trout Run is one of three western Erie County tributaries thought to be raising E. coli counts off Lake Erie beaches at nearby Presque Isle State Park.

=== Twelvemile Creek Sub-watershed ===
Twelvemile Creek

=== Twentymile Creek Sub-watershed ===
Twentymile Creek extends into New York

=== 29.0 Mile Run Sub-watershed ===
29.0 Mile Run

=== 26.9 Mile Run Sub-watershed ===
26.9 Mile Run

=== Walnut Creek Sub-watershed ===
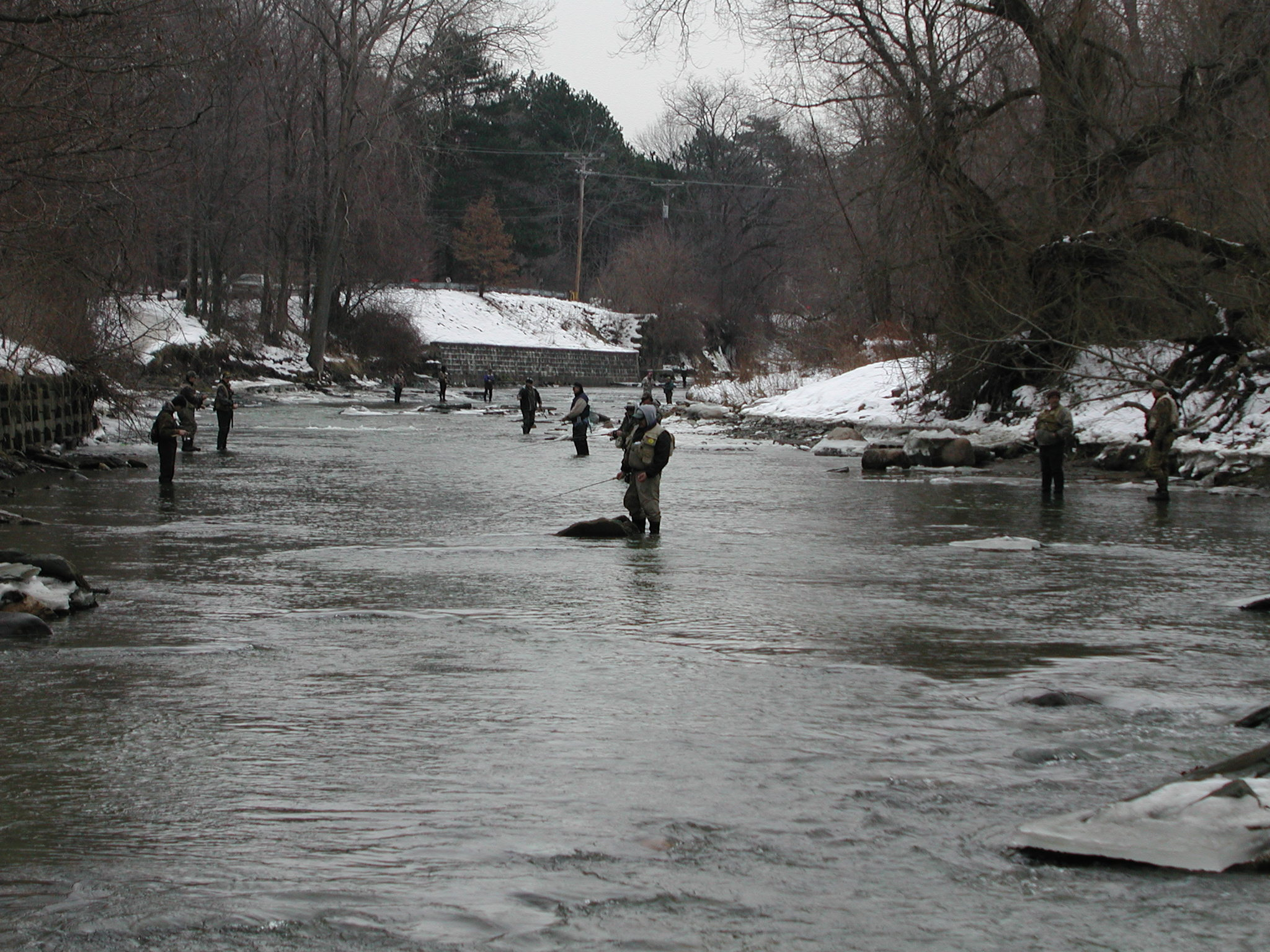
Mouth of Walnut Creek, access area

This sub-watershed consists of Walnut Creek and surrounding lands of the City of Erie, Fairview Township, Greene Township, McKean Township, Millcreek Township, and Summit Township. Significant developments in this sub-watershed include Asbury Woods Community Park and Nature Center, Baldwin Business Park, Bush Industries, Erie Golf Club, Erie Memorial Gardens, Family First Sports Park, Kahkwa Club, Lakeview Landfill, Laurel Hill Cemetery, Millcreek Mall, Orchard Ponds Golf Course, Presque Isle Downs, and Upper Peach Street.

A detailed online report on the Walnut Creek watershed is available from the Pennsylvania Department of Environmental Protection (PA DEP).

The Lakeview Landfill is a PA DEP-permitted surface mining operation.

The inclusion of a race track at Presque Isle Downs and Casino will bring up to one thousand horses to fill ten barns on the grounds by summer 2008. The horses are expected to produce up to ten tons of manure and hay waste per day, which will be transported and sold. Fifteen acres of man-made wetlands have been situated in the center of the racetrack to deal with runoff issues that could impact the watershed.

Most sewage waste is processed at the Erie Wastewater Treatment Facility and released two miles (3 km) out in Lake Erie. There are 28 privately owned waste treatment plants that release directly into the watershed.

There are three companies in the watershed with industrial stormwater release permits from PA DEP.

Walnut Creek is one of three western Erie County tributaries thought to be raising E. coli counts off Lake Erie beaches at nearby Presque Isle State Park.
