= Walnut Creek (Lake Erie) =

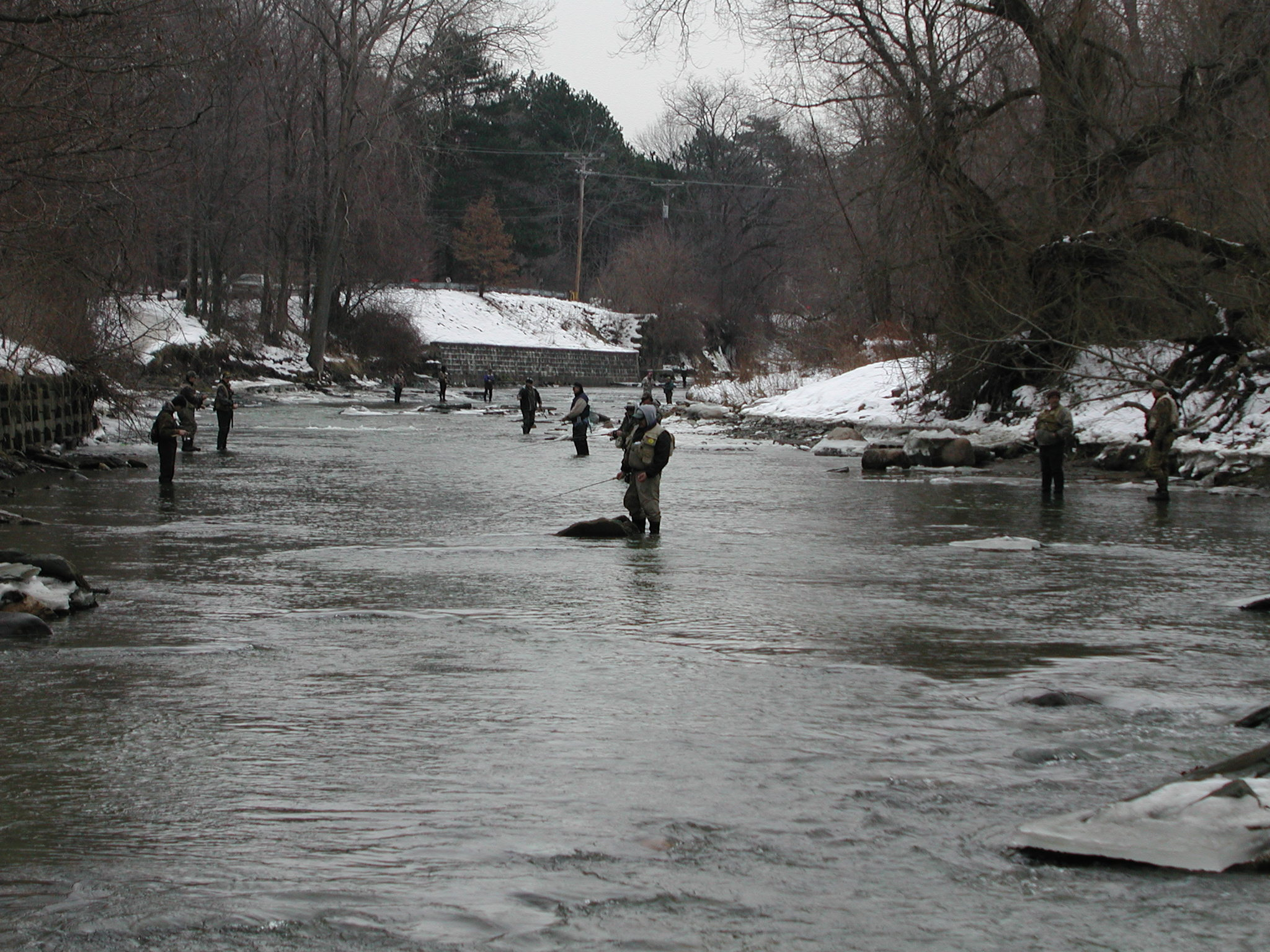
- Fishermen on Walnut Creek during the winter

- Location of the mouth of Walnut Creek in Pennsylvania
- Etymology: "walnut"

Location
- Country: United States
- State: Pennsylvania
- County: Erie

Physical characteristics
- Source
  - location: Hammett, Erie County, Pennsylvania
  - coordinates: 42°2′24″N 80°0′3″W
  - elevation: 1,460 ft (450 m)
- Mouth: Lake Erie
  - location: Manchester Beach, Erie County, Pennsylvania
  - coordinates: 42°4′37″N 80°14′23″W
  - elevation: 572 ft (174 m)
- Length: 22.6 mi (36.4 km)
- Basin size: 38.1 sq mi (99 km^{2})

Walnut Creek is a 22.6-mile (36.4 km) tributary of Lake Erie in Erie County, Pennsylvania in the United States. It has a drainage basin of 38.1 square miles (99 km^{2}) and is part of the Lake Erie Watershed.

Walnut Creek is a popular location for steelhead fishing and is stocked with steelhead. A marina near the mouth of the creek, maintained by the Pennsylvania Fish and Boat Commission, offers access for fishers as well as boat access to Lake Erie.

== Geography and Geology ==
Walnut Creek runs through Summit, Millcreek, and Fairview Townships with the watershed also draining portions of McKean and Greene Townships. The creek takes an indirect path to Lake Erie as glacial moraines deflect its flow to the west before it turns north toward the lake. Like other tributaries of Lake Erie in Pennsylvania, Walnut Creek has eroded through glacial till and lake sediments and into sedimentary rock from the Devonian period, consisting mainly of shale interbedded with siltstone and sandstone. Some of these rocks contain marine fossils.

== See also ==
- List of rivers of Pennsylvania
