= Perry Square =

Coordinates: 42.12930°N 80.08524°W

Oliver H. Perry

Detailed image of Perry statue

Eben Brewer

Memorial to Erie County Civil War dead

Fallen police officers of Erie

Perry Square is one of the series of city squares planned by famed surveyor Andrew Ellicott in downtown Erie, Pennsylvania, USA. The park diverts the flow of 6th Street for two wooded city blocks bisected by State Street, which separates the city's eastern and western halves. The park is bounded by French Street on the east and Peach Street on the west, while Park Row North and Park Row South carry 6th Street traffic around the northern and southern sides of the square. There is a gazebo in the center of the western block, and a fountain in the center of the eastern block.

Adjacent to the park are Erie City Hall, the US Federal Court House, the Erie County Courthouse, Gannon University, the old Erie County Public Library, the Richford Arms (Ford Hotel), Erie Insurance Group, the Erie Club, and the North Park Row business block.

The park has hosted the Erie Farmers' Market since it moved from Griswold Park in the summer of 2008 due to major construction. Regional farmers pay a one-time fee to sell their produce weekly during the summer months. Music is played from the gazebo. (Ward 3)

A master plan for the redesign of the park was unveiled to the City Council on 5 February 2008. The plan, which has yet to be reviewed by the council or local businesses, proposes the removal of the gazebo and the installation of a stage on the west side of the park, while the fountain on the east side would be renovated. Park Row North and South would be narrowed to allow parking. State Street would gain a median. A tree clearing plan and new lighting was completed in summer 2008. Additionally, the city recently received $380,000 in federal funding to be used in the park's renovations.

== Statues ==
- A statue of Commodore Oliver Hazard Perry, commander of the US Naval Fleet in the Battle of Lake Erie and hero of the War of 1812, stands at the east (French Street) end of the park, facing approaching traffic on East 6th Street. It was erected on 23 August 1985 on the bicentennial of Perry's birth. It's a reasonably good copy of the original 1885 Perry statue found in Newport, RI.
- A statue of Eben Brewer (1849-14 July 1898), first mail agent of the United States in Cuba, was erected by United States postal employees to memorialize his service. The statue was dedicated at the postmasters convention in 1907. Art Inventories Catalog, Smithsonian American Art Museum
- A statue of a Union soldier and a sailor, both standing, serves as a memorial to those from Erie County who gave their lives to save the Union. It stands at the west (Peach Street) end of the park, facing approaching traffic on West 6th Street.
- A memorial to Anthony Wayne, American Revolutionary War hero, consisting of a pair of cannon facing opposite directions mounted on a stone, was erected by the Daughters of the American Revolution (DAR) in 1902.
- A base without a statue is etched with the words: Presented to the City of Erie by Geo. D. Selden on 30 May 1893. This base is very likely linked to the Erie City Iron Works, of which George Selden was president and George D. Selden was treasurer.

== Memorials and commemorations ==
- Memorials and plaques can be found near the Civil War memorial, dedicated to those who served in the World War I, World War II, the Korean War, the Vietnam War, Operation Desert Storm, as well as plaques for those who died in the World War and all those who remain missing in action (MIA) or prisoners of war (POW) from World War II, the Korean War, and the Vietnam War.
- Memorials list fallen police officers and firefighters.
- A stone erected by organized labor in 1989 recognizes the past, present, and future contributions of working men and women of Erie County to their communities.
