= Erie Zoo =

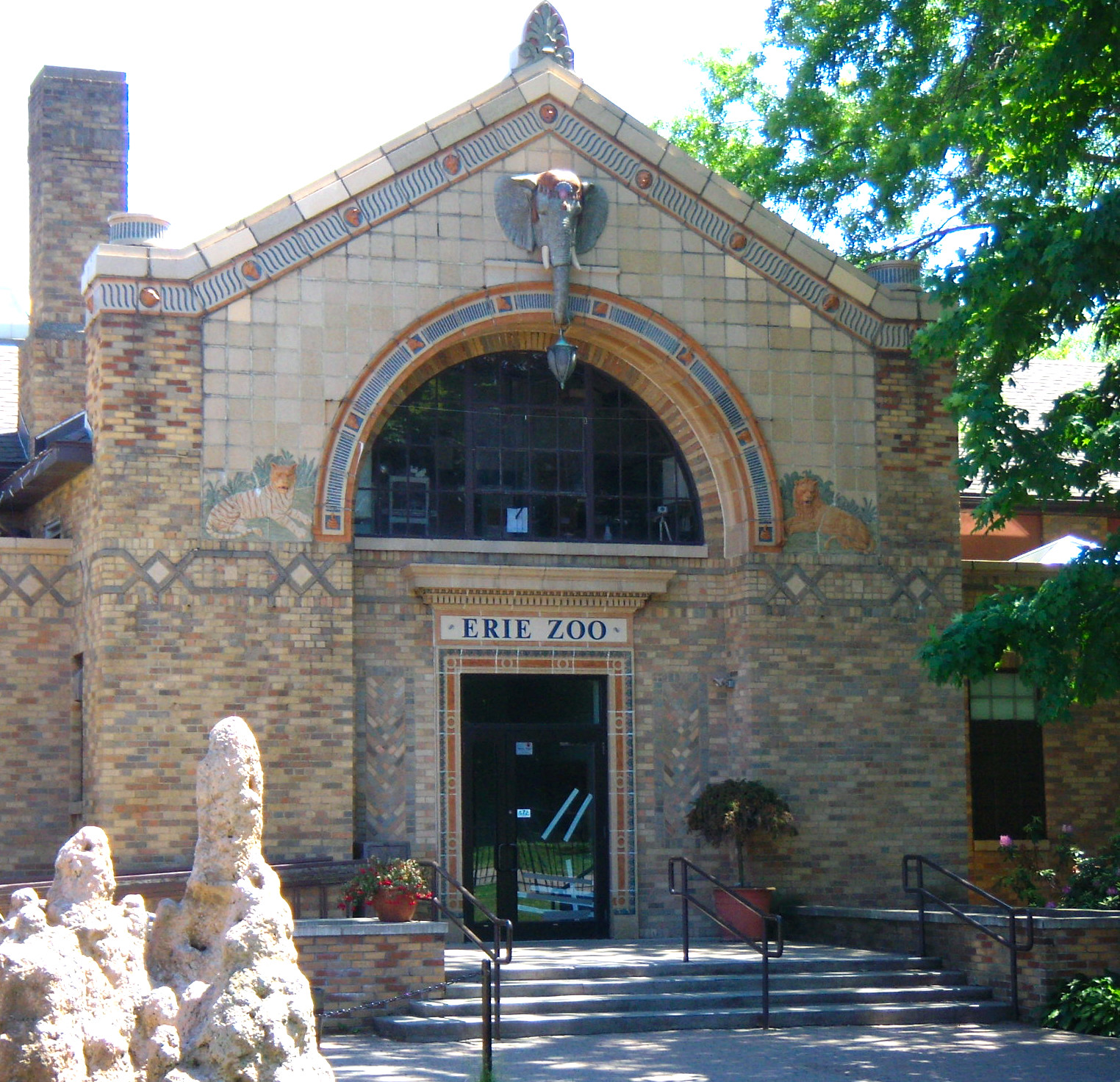
- The entrance to Erie Zoo in June 2007
- Interactive map of Erie Zoo
- 42.0968°N 80.0755°W
- Date opened: 1930
- Location: Erie, Pennsylvania, U.S.
- Land area: 15 acres (6.1 ha)
- No. of animals: 400+
- Annual visitors: 400,000 (2007)
- Memberships: previous member of AZA before November 2021
- Website: www.eriezoo.org

The Erie Zoo (formally Erie Zoological Park and Botanical Garden of Northwestern Pennsylvania), is a zoological park in Erie, Pennsylvania. It is located on 15 acres (6.1 ha) of land in Glenwood Park, just off West 38th Street between Cherry Street and Glenwood Park Avenue. The zoo has more than 400 animals, while the botanical gardens and greenhouse have over 600 species of plants from around the world. The zoo, which operates from March to November, attracts more than 400,000 annual visitors.

The Erie Zoo was a member of the Association of Zoos and Aquariums (AZA) until 2021. As of September 2023, the zoo is still not a member of the AZA., but the zoo intends to regain accreditation.

== Operations ==
Erie has operated a zoo since about 1927, when "Tom-boy" the elephant arrived as a gift to the city. The Robert Evans estate was soon donated for the purposes of establishing a zoological park. A permanent home for the elephant was built in 1929 and the park opened a year later.

John M. Cochran, founding president of the Erie Zoological Society (1962), was active in expanding and renovating the zoo. A forty-year $1.08 million bond issue, resulting in the construction of the ice arena and the Pixieland children's zoo, among other things, are in large part the work of Cochran. A plaque hangs in the main building in remembrance of his efforts.

Since 1964, the zoo has been owned by the Erie Municipal Park Authority, which leases the zoo back to the City of Erie. In order to float the 1964 bond issue for improvements at the zoo, the city was required to create a financing authority to hold the property title. A five-member board of directors is chosen by the Erie City Council to run the authority. The city pays most of the zoo's utilities and insurance expenses but delegates operation of the zoo to the Erie Zoological Society. The society is a 501(c)(3) organization with a 14-member board representing many of the region's communities. As of 2007, roughly ten percent of the society's annual budget is funded by municipalities, with the balance received through philanthropy.

== Facilities and attractions ==
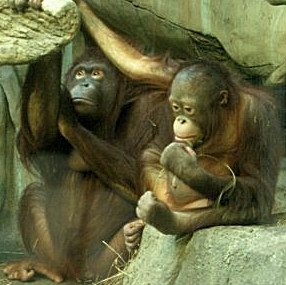
Bornean orangutans at the Erie Zoo

The Main Zoo Building was dedicated on August 7, 1930. The building was restored and modified in 1991 as a visitors' entrance to the zoo. It continues to incorporate an array of animal displays.

The tiger exhibit, which opened in the summer of 2008, has a main exhibit area plus outdoor and indoor containment areas. In March 2008, a breeding pair of Siberian tigers joined Kumar, a white tiger who has been at the zoo since April 1994. An Amur leopard was transferred to the Philadelphia Zoo in the summer of 2006.

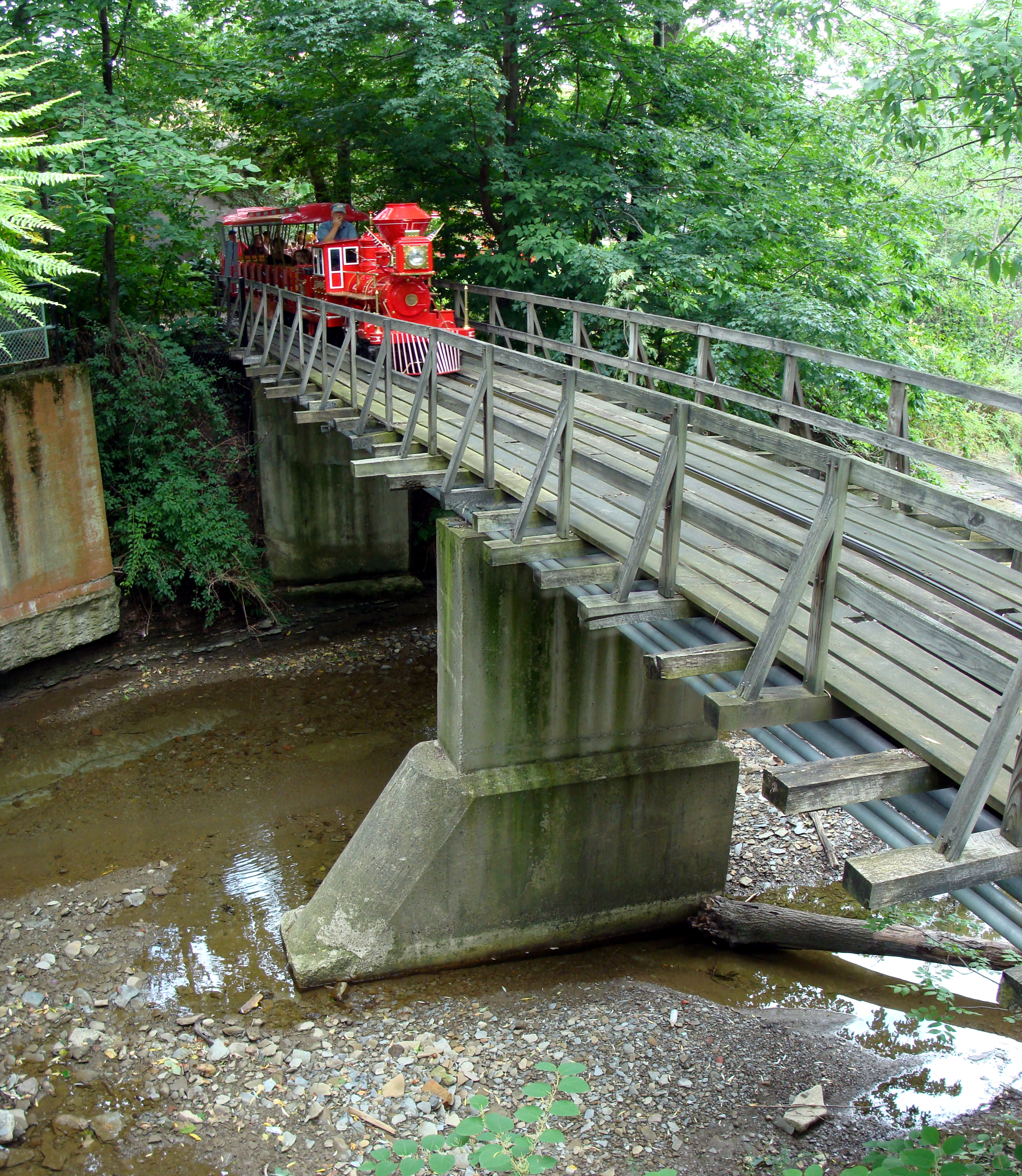
The zoo train crossing Mill Creek. The creek flows through the middle of the zoo.

The Children's Zoo, once called Pixieland, includes many exhibits, including animal shows in a nature theater, a playground, and a water garden.

The adjoining JMC Ice Arena, named in honor of founding President of the Erie Zoological Society John M Cochran, is operated by the Erie Zoological Society.

== Mascots ==
The zoo's mascots—Cool Bear and Perry the Penguin—appear annually at ZooBoo, the zoo's popular Halloween event, as well as at regional sporting events and other family activities. Cool Bear is friends with C. Wolf, of the Erie SeaWolves, as well as other local mascots.

== Zoo officials ==
The zoo is operated through a board of directors headed by a president and chief executive officer. Other positions at the zoo include general curator, zoo director, and press spokesman. The following are some recent zoo officials.

Zoo Officials
| Name (Overall years of service at zoo) | Official title | Start date in post (*earliest known date) | End date in post (*latest known date) |
|---|---|---|---|
| Melissa “Roo” Kojancie | CEO | December 5, 2023 | |
| James P. "Jim" Rhea (1966–2007) | President and CEO | 1984 | 2007 |
| | President and CEO | 2007 | |
| | Zoo Director | 2007 | |
| James P. "Jim" Rhea (1966–2007) | Zoo Director | * 1969 | * 1994 |
| Cynthia Kreider | General Curator | | 2007 |

== In popular culture ==
Comedian Mike Birbiglia once criticized the zoo as part of one of his stand-up comedy routines.
