= Raccoon Creek (Erie County, Pennsylvania) =

Stream in Pennsylvania, USA

Raccoon Creek Tributary to Lake Erie
- Location of Raccoon Creek mouth Raccoon Creek (Erie County, Pennsylvania) (the United States)

Location
- Country: United States
- State: Pennsylvania
- County: Erie

Physical characteristics
- Source: Conneaut Creek divide
  - location: about 2 miles south of West Springfield, Pennsylvania
  - coordinates: 41°55′35.00″N 080°28′5.00″W
  - elevation: 865 ft (264 m)
- Mouth: Lake Erie
  - location: about 6 miles north of West Springfield, Pennsylvania
  - coordinates: 41°59′25.20″N 080°28′57.25″W
  - elevation: 571 ft (174 m)
- Length: 6.58 mi (10.59 km)
- Basin size: 8.31 square miles (21.5 km^{2})
- Discharge
  - location: Lake Erie
  - average: 12.10 cu ft/s (0.343 m^{3}/s) at mouth with Lake Erie

Basin features
- Progression: Lake Erie → Niagara River → Lake Ontario → St. Lawrence River → Atlantic Ocean
- River system: Lake Erie
- Bridges: Huntley Road, Griffey Road, US 6N, Old Albion Road, I-90, Sanford Road, Coon Creek Road, West Ridge Road, West Lake Road, Elmwood Home Road, Ellis Road, Old Lake Road

Raccoon Creek is located in northwestern Pennsylvania just west of West Springfield in Erie County. Its mouth opens into Lake Erie not far from the Ohio border. Raccoon Creek Park is a township picnic area located just to the east of the creeks.

== Course ==
Raccoon Creek rises in a pond on the Conneaut Creek divide about 2 miles south of West Springfield, Pennsylvania and then flows northeast and turns north-northwest to join Lake Erie about 6 miles north of West Springfield, Pennsylvania.

== Watershed ==
Raccoon Creek drains 8.31 square miles (21.5 km^{2}) of area, receives about 41.9 in/year of precipitation, has a wetness index of 499.60, and is about 53.74% forested.

== See also ==
- List of rivers of Pennsylvania
