= Presque Isle Bay =

- Erie Harbor
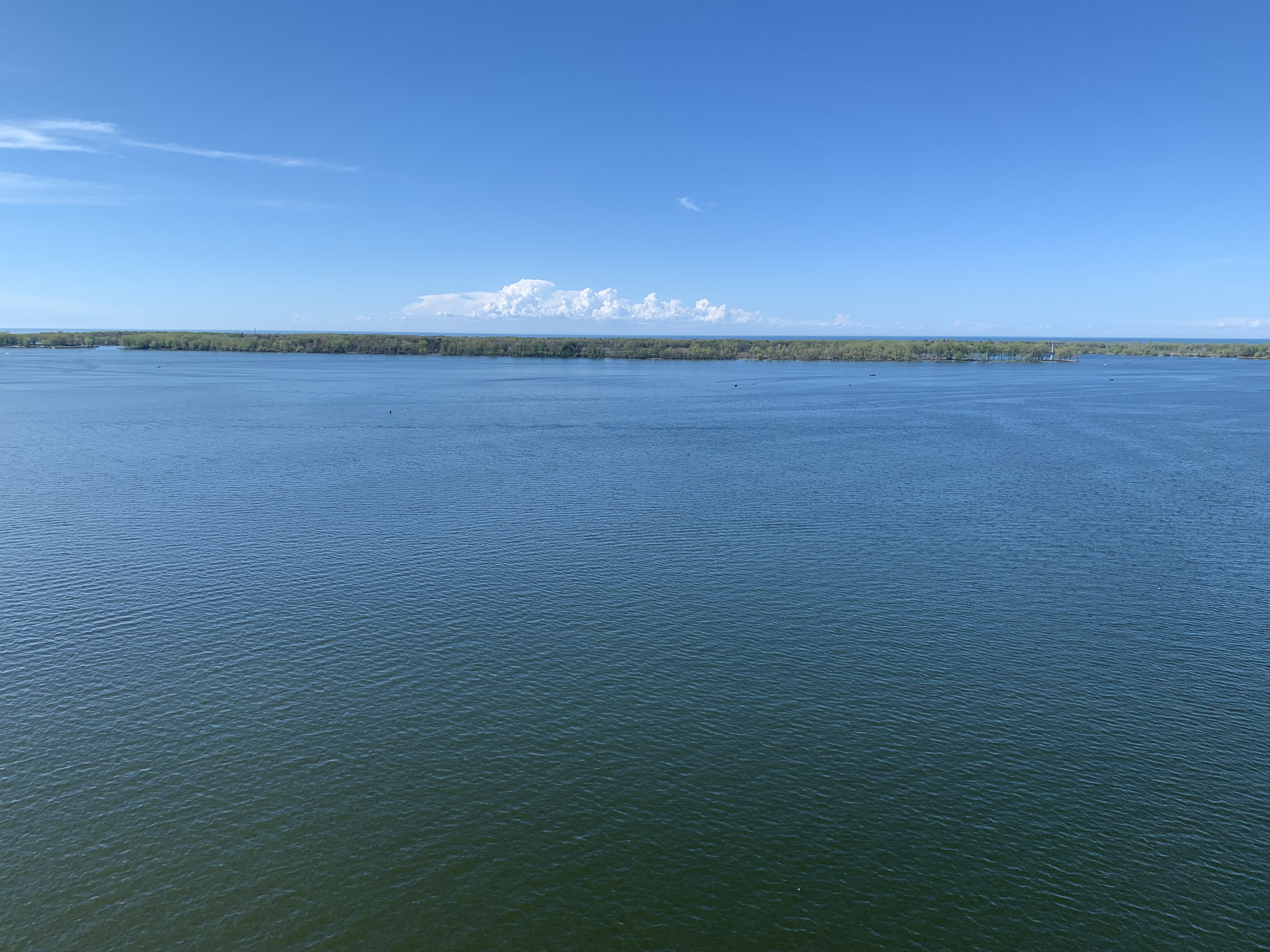
- Presque Isle Bay in May 2022

- Location of Presque Isle in Pennsylvania
- Location: Millcreek, Pennsylvania, U.S.
- Coordinates: 42°8′15″N 80°6′54″W
- Type: Bay
- Catchment area: 25 sq mi (65 km^{2})
- Max. length: 4.6 mi (7.4 km)
- Max. width: 1.8 mi (2.9 km)
- Surface area: 5.8 sq mi (15 km^{2})
- Average depth: 20 ft (6.1 m)
- Surface elevation: 571 ft (174 m)

Presque Isle Bay is a natural bay located off the coast of Erie, Pennsylvania. Its 5.8-square-mile (15 km^{2}) embayment is about 4.6 miles (7.4 km) in length, about 1.8 mi (2.9 km) across at its widest point, and an average depth of about 20 feet (6.1 m).

The bay is at an elevation of 571 ft (174 m) above sea level. It is bounded on the north and west by a recurved peninsula that makes up Presque Isle State Park. On the south, the bay is edged by the urban Erie shoreline, which hosts the Port of Erie Marine Terminal, as well as an assortment of parks, tourist attractions and marinas such as the Erie Yacht Club. Fishing, water skiing, swimming, and boating, are a few examples of common activities among visitors who come to appreciate this natural bay for its sheltered waters and captivating views of Erie’s historic neighborhoods and landmarks.

A channel on the east provides a shipping lane into and out of Lake Erie. Cascade Creek, Garrison Run, Mill Creek, and surface runoff drain the lands of the Presque Isle Bay Watershed into the bay.

== History ==
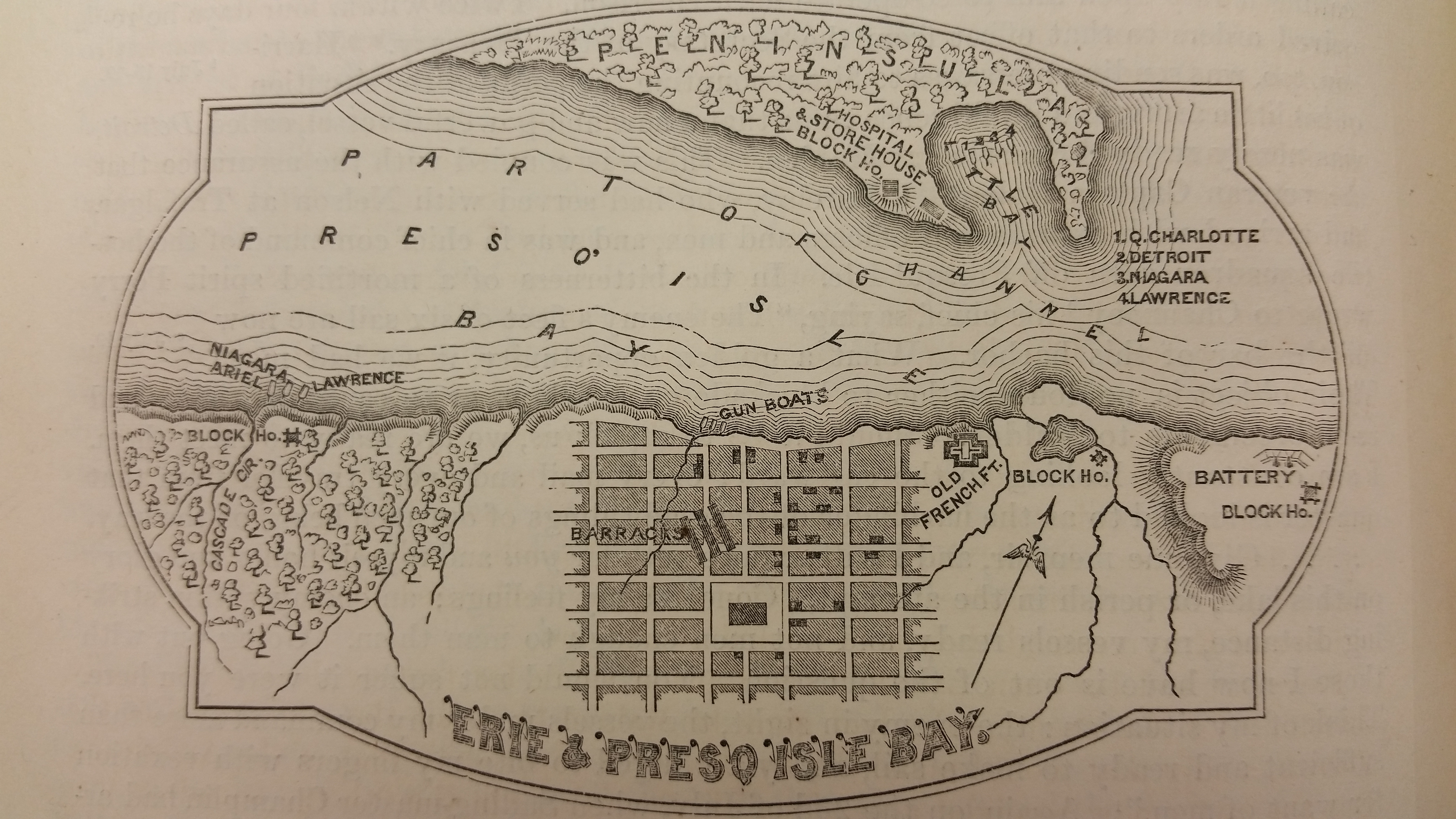
A map of Presque Isle Bay during the War of 1812

Commander Oliver Hazard Perry took command of America's Lake Erie naval fleet at Presque Isle in March 1813. By the end of July 1813, Perry had assembled the necessary crews and escaped a blockade of the channel exit by Commander Robert Heriot Barclay, Perry's British counterpart. With access to the lake, Perry led his fleet west to Put-in-Bay, Ohio, where the Battle of Lake Erie was fought in September 1813.

== Recovery ==
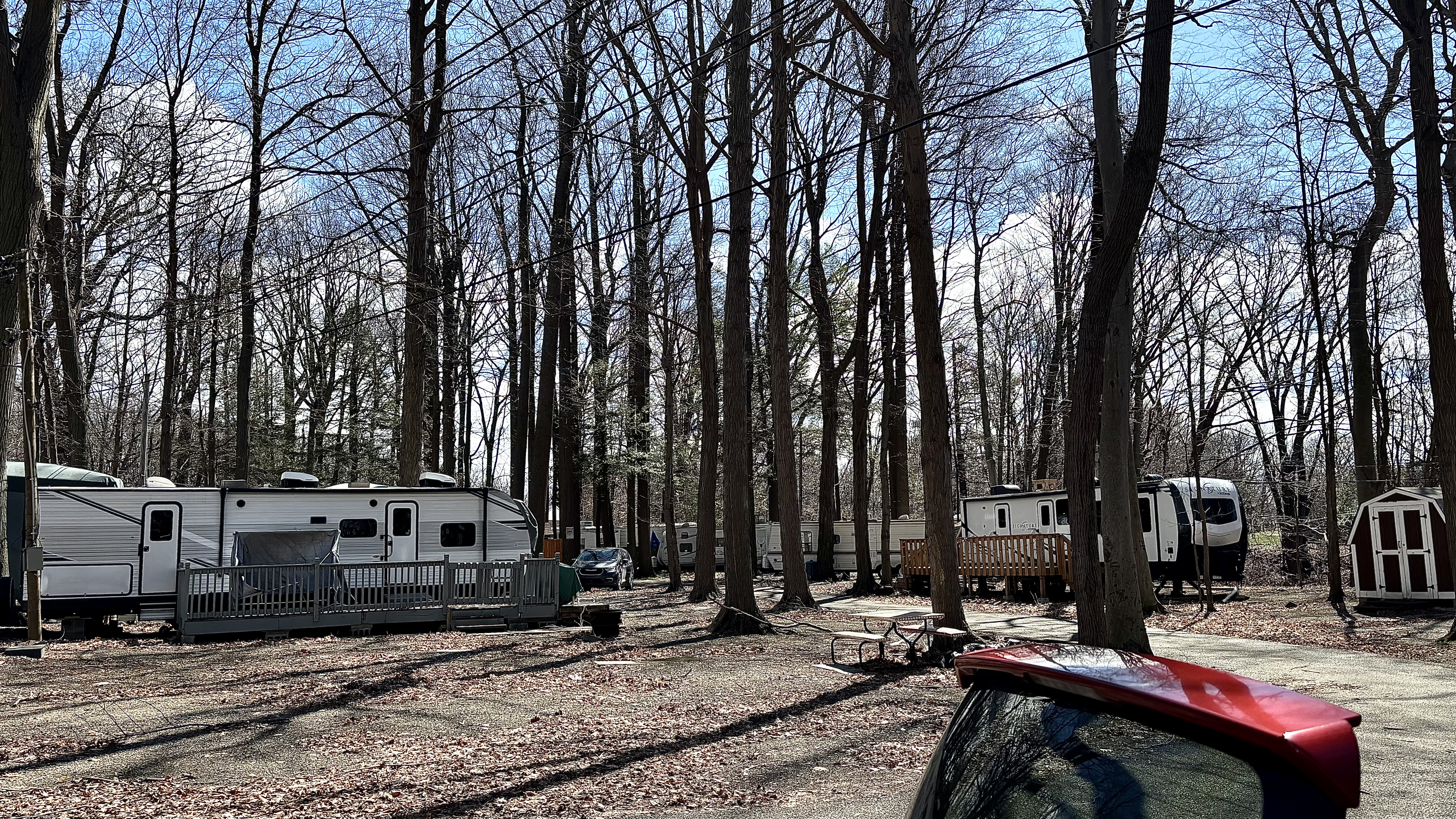
Presque Isle campground in March 2026

After pollution of the bay caused by sewage and industrial waste forced an end to swimming and caused the appearance of tumors on brown bullheads and other fishes, Erie established the Erie Harbor Improvement Council in 1988 to seek remediation. Later called the Presque Isle Bay Public Advisory Committee, the group was instrumental in having the bay listed as one of the Great Lakes Areas of Concern (AOC) in 1991. It then pushed for the establishment of a Remedial Action Plan (RAP) in 1993, which was updated in 1995 and 2002 to make key fixes with the goal of the resumption of swimming and fishing in the bay. In 2002, the bay became the first US AOC to be awarded Recovery Stage status. A ceremonial swim by 300 swimmers was scheduled for 28 June 2008 to celebrate the recovery of the bay.

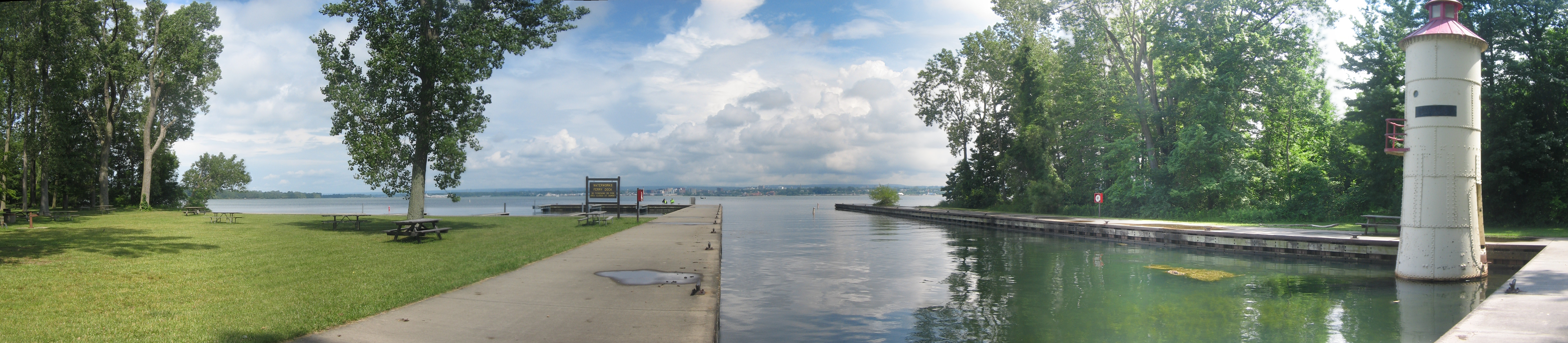
Panoramic view of Waterworks Ferry slip and pump with Presque Isle Bay and Erie, Pennsylvania in the background from Presque Isle State Park
