= Mill Creek (Lake Erie) =

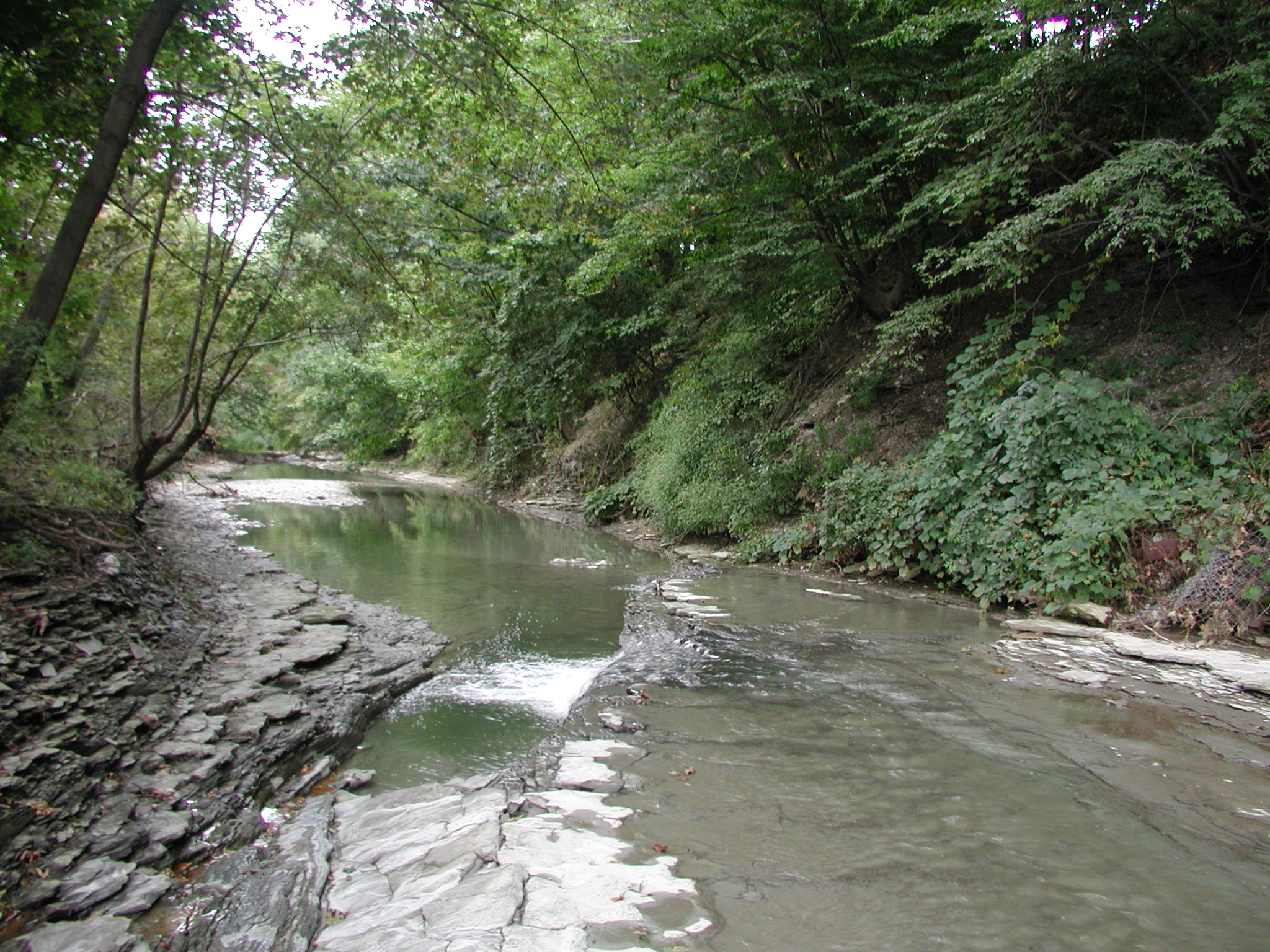
- Mill Creek south of the tube, looking downstream

- Location of the mouth of Mill Creek in Pennsylvania
- Etymology: "mill" built along the creek

Location
- Country: United States
- State: Pennsylvania
- County: Erie

Physical characteristics
- Source
  - location: Millcreek Township, Pennsylvania
  - coordinates: 42°6′29″N 80°0′15″W
  - elevation: 1,029 ft (314 m)
- Mouth: Presque Isle Bay
  - location: Downtown Erie, Pennsylvania
  - coordinates: 42°8′37″N 80°4′49″W
  - elevation: 577 ft (176 m)
- Length: 18.96 mi (30.51 km)
- Basin size: 12.20 sq mi (31.6 km^{2})

Mill Creek is a 19-mile (31 km) long tributary of Lake Erie in Erie County in the U.S. state of Pennsylvania. It flows from Millcreek Township through the city of Erie, into Presque Isle Bay.

Much of the creek in the city was channeled into the Mill Creek Tube, which was constructed after Mill Creek's disastrous flood struck the city in 1915.

== Course ==
Mill Creek begins in extreme eastern Millcreek Township and travels westward until it is joined by a couple of smaller tributary streams. From there, it roughly follows Pennsylvania Route 505 (Glenwood Park Avenue) northward until the creek is diverted underground.

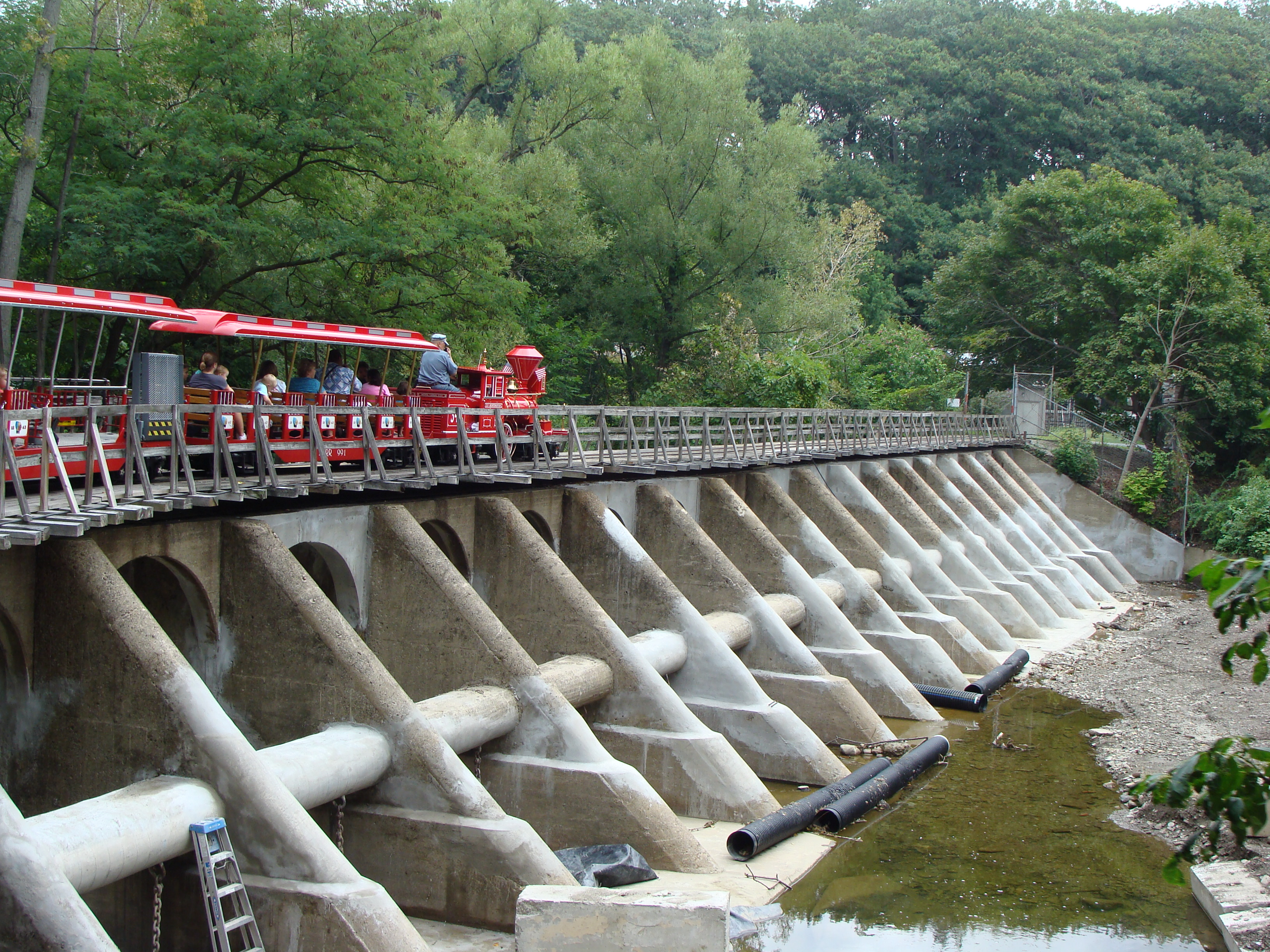
The drift catcher also functions as a bridge for the Erie Zoo train.

The creek passes through the middle of the Erie Zoo, where several bridges span the creek. One of the bridges is designed to act as a "drift catcher", preventing large debris from entering the tube further downstream. The drift catcher is also used by the zoo's train to cross over Mill Creek.

At 30th Street, Mill Creek is diverted underground, for over 2 miles (3 km) through the Mill Creek Tube and passes underneath downtown Erie. The creek reappears above ground on the northern side of the Bayfront Parkway before emptying into Presque Isle Bay at the eastern end of the bay near South Pier.

== History ==
The city of Erie and Millcreek Township were both settled in 1795. Erie County was formed from portions from Allegheny County on March 12, 1800, with the township being incorporated at the same time.

=== Mills ===
The first mill in Erie County was built at the mouth of the creek, giving the creek its name. By 1835, four gristmills and thirteen sawmills were located along and powered by the Mill Creek.

=== Flood ===
Mill Creek had a history of overflowing its banks, with one happening in 1893; however the worst such flood occurred on August 3, 1915. After a series of storms produced over 5.77 inches (147 mm) of rain in 13 hours, saturated soil on the banks collapsed, carrying numerous small outbuildings into the creek. The resulting debris obstructed a culvert under 26th Street, producing a reservoir extending for four city blocks. Attempts to clear the blockage involving the use of dynamite failed.

Around 8:30 PM the culvert gave way, releasing the pent-up floodwaters into downtown Erie. The flood traveled through the city at 25 miles per hour (40 km/h), leaving a path of destruction 3 miles (4.8 km) long and 6 blocks wide. In all, 225 houses were damaged or destroyed, along with over 300 other buildings and 36 fatalities. To prevent another flood, the city enclosed Mill Creek in a concrete tube running underneath the city.

== Mill Creek Tube ==
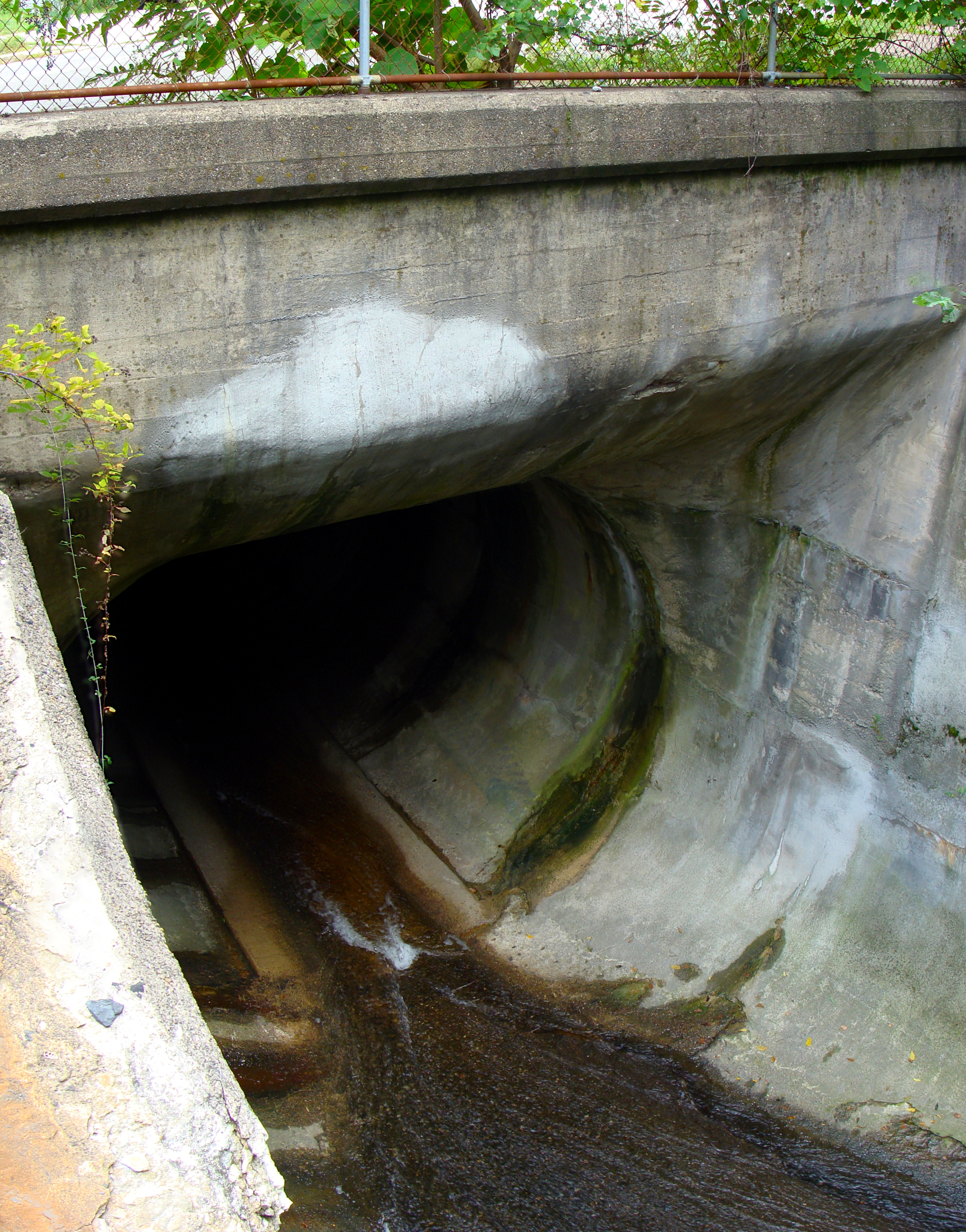
The entrance to the tube at 30th Street

The Mill Creek Tube is a 22-foot (6.7 m) wide, 19-foot (5.8 m) tall, and 12,280-foot (3,740 m) long, reinforced concrete tube that carries Mill Creek under the city of Erie. Built to prevent another catastrophic flood similar to the one in 1915, the tube was completed in 1923. It begins on the southern side of West 30th Street and terminates on the northern side of the Bayfront Parkway. The tube contains over 70,000 barrels, or 13,600 short tons (12,300 t), of cement and drops 200 feet (61 m) over its total length.

As the tube is "large enough for a Jeep or [a] pickup to ride through—and turn around in", it is occasionally the site of water rescues when people have been swept into it when the creek is high and have become stranded. One such rescue occurred on July 26, 2007, after three teenagers were caught up in the swiftly moving Mill Creek. One was rescued by firefighters near the mouth of the tube, another near 26th Street, and one traversed the entire tube before being rescued.

Situated about a 1 mile (1.6 km) upstream of the tube is a drift catcher used to stop large debris from reaching the tube. The catcher is 209 feet (64 m) long and 18 feet (5.5 m) high. It was built at the same time as the tube. The catcher was modified in 1965 to accommodate the Erie Zoo's miniature railroad. It underwent a $476,800 restoration from May to August 2010 to seal cracks, repair deteriorating concrete and inspect one of the bridge's retaining walls.

== See also ==
- Lake Erie Watershed (Pennsylvania)
- List of rivers of Pennsylvania

== Sources ==
- Bates, Samuel P (1884). History of Erie County, Pennsylvania. Chicago: Warner, Beers & Co.
- Boyd, Brandon (July 1, 2010). "Catch the drift?". Erie Times-News. p. 1B–2B.
- Pennsylvania Gazetteer of Streams (PDF). Harrisburg: Pennsylvania Department of Environmental Protection. 2001. Archived from the original (PDF) on June 25, 2008.
- "Confining Mill Creek to a Concrete Tube". Concrete. 12 (5). Detroit: Concrete–Cement Age Publishing: 187. May 1918.
- "Erie's Blackest Day & Other Accounts of Phenomenal Weather" (PDF). Erie County Historical Society. October 2008. Archived from the original (PDF) on July 24, 2011.
- Hottenstein, JoAnne; Welch, Sibyl (1965). "Erie County". Incorporation dates of Pennsylvania municipalities (PDF). Harrisburg: Bureau of Municipal Affairs, Pennsylvania Department of Internal Affairs.
- Sweeney, Steven M; Rhodes, Kara (July 27, 2007). "A dangerous and wild ride". Erie Times-News. pp. 1A, 4A.
