= Summit Township, Erie County, Pennsylvania =

Township in Pennsylvania, US

Coordinates: 41°59′59″N 80°00′59″W

Summit Township, Pennsylvania
- Township
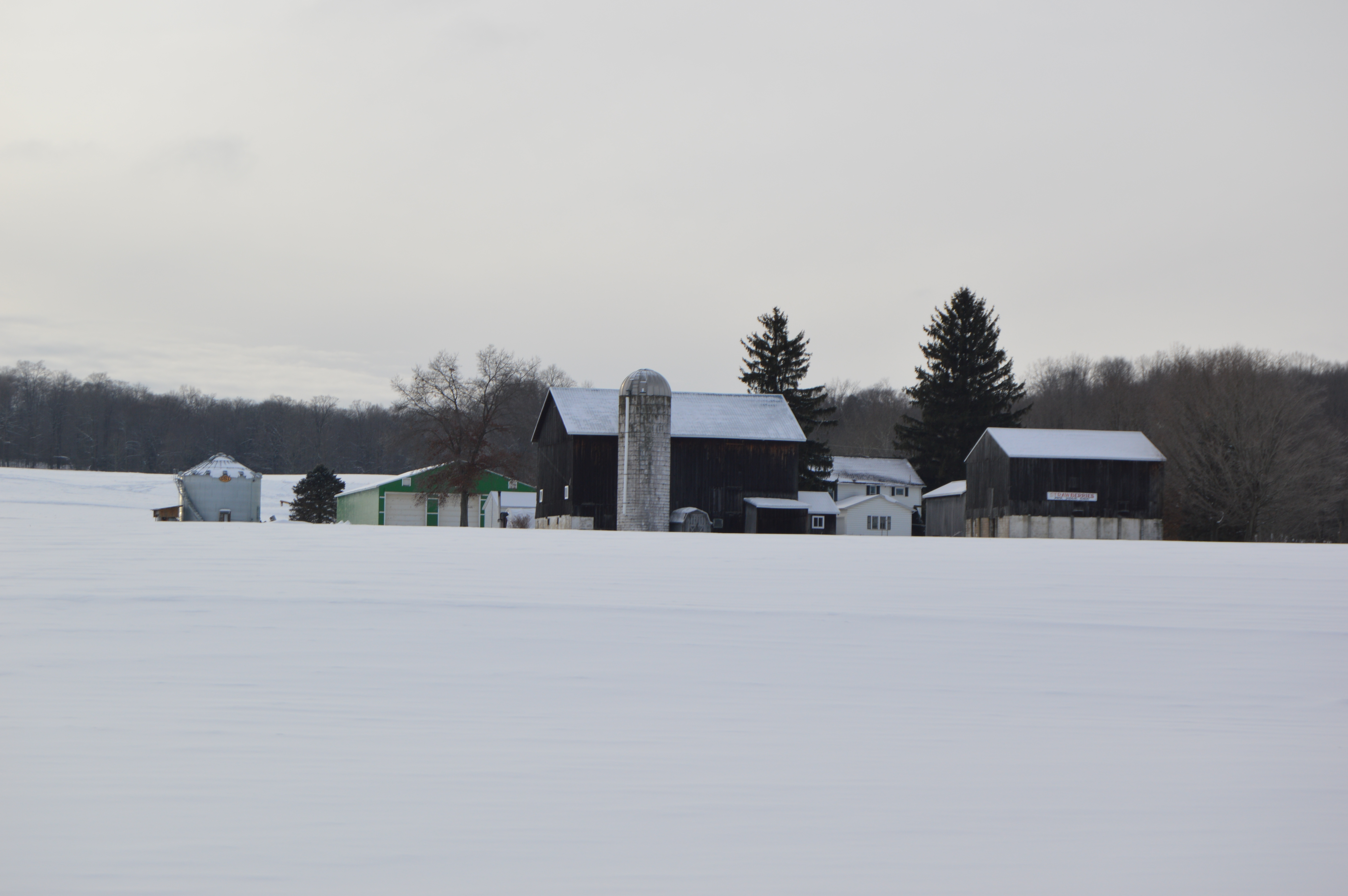
- Farm near Pennsylvania Route 97

- Flag Logo

- Location in Erie County and the U.S. state of Pennsylvania
- Country: United States
- State: Pennsylvania
- County: Erie

Area
  - Total: 24.06 sq mi (62.32 km^{2})
  - Land: 24.05 sq mi (62.29 km^{2})
  - Water: 0.012 sq mi (0.03 km^{2})

Population (2020)
  - Total: 7,339
  - Estimate (2023): 7,273
  - Density: 287.6/sq mi (111.03/km^{2})
- Time zone: UTC-4 (EST)
  - Summer (DST): UTC-5 (EDT)
- Area code: 814
- FIPS code: 42-049-75208
- Website: www.summittownship.com

Summit Township is a township in Erie County, Pennsylvania. The population was 7,339 at the time of the 2020 census, up from 6,603 at the 2010 census.

== Geography ==
The township is in central Erie County and sits on the high ground separating the streams flowing north and west into Lake Erie, part of the St. Lawrence River watershed, from those flowing south towards the Mississippi River and the Gulf of Mexico. Walnut Creek, which flows west through Millcreek and Fairview townships to Lake Erie, rises near the eastern border of the township. At the same time LeBoeuf Creek forms less than one mile to the west, flowing south to French Creek, a tributary of the Allegheny River, and thus to the Ohio and Mississippi as well.

Millcreek Township lies 8 miles (13 km) south of downtown Erie and uses two exits from Interstate 90 for highway access.

According to the United States Census Bureau, Summit Township has a total area of 24.1 square miles (62.3 km^{2}), all land.

== Demographics ==
Historical population
Census	Pop.	Note	%±
1980	5,381		—
1990	5,284		−1.8%
2000	5,529		4.6%
2010	6,603		19.4%
2020	7,339		11.1%
2023 (est.)	7,273		−0.9%
U.S. Decennial Census

As of the census of 2000, there were 5,529 people, 2,110 households, and 1,531 families residing in the township. The population density was 231.6 inhabitants per square mile (89.4/km^{2}). There were 2,212 housing units at an average density of 92.6 per square mile (35.8/km^{2}). The racial makeup of the township was 98.25% White, 0.56% African American, 0.13% Native American, 0.24% Asian, 0.24% from other races, and 0.60% from two or more races. Hispanic or Latino of any race were 0.34% of the population.

Millcreek Township included 2,110 households. Of these, 29.3% had children under the age of 18 living with them, and 61.2% consisted of married couples living together. Female householders with no husband present accounted for 7.5%, while non-family households made up 27.4%. Individuals made up 21.6% of all households, and 8.2% of households had someone living alone who was 65 years of age or older. The average household size was 2.59, and the average family size was 3.03.

In the township, the population was spread out, with 23.5% under the age of 18, 7.0% from 18 to 24, 27.0% from 25 to 44, 27.1% from 45 to 64, and 15.4% who were 65 years of age or older. The median age was 40 years. For every 100 females, there were 98.9 males. For every 100 females age 18 and over, there were 94.3 males.

The median income for a household in the township was $41,688, and the median income for a family was $45,048. Males had a median income of $40,059 versus $22,057 for females. The per capita income for the township was $19,782. About 4.7% of families and 6.9% of the population were below the poverty line, including 10.6% of those under age 18 and 3.1% of those age 65 or over.

== Economy ==
Much of Erie's commercial development has occurred along Peach Street (U.S. Route 19). The township has recently seen the development of the new Presque Isle Downs and Casino, a racino owned by Eldorado Resorts, along with more than ten hotels and many highly rated restaurants. The township has also seen the construction of numerous new housing developments and recreational facilities. Family First Sports Park holds many sporting events from soccer to basketball to golf.

== Emergency response ==
Summit Township's only fire department, Perry Highway Hose Company, is split into two fire stations, one on each side of the township. Station 42, at 501 E. Robison Road, currently houses a complete fire station that contains two ALS ambulances, a Paramedic truck, an engine, and a ladder. Station 43, at 8281 Oliver Road (replacing former station 43 at 8270 Peach Street), less than a mile from the Erie County 911 center, holds a heavy rescue, tanker, engine, a utility truck, and a brush truck. This firehouse, built in 2009, houses members of the live-in program. Station 43 also features a large, attached social hall that hosts firehouse events and is available for rent to the public for weddings, receptions, and birthday parties. Located behind Station 42 are the Erie County regional fire training grounds. All fire departments utilize the training grounds, the Erie County haz-mat team, and the Erie Airport fire/rescue services. Props in the training grounds include a four-story non-burn training tower, a burn facility, a dumpster fire prop, a car fire prop, a flammable gas prop, a semi truck haz-mat prop, and a roof prop. The facility is also home to the PEMA Emergency Response Group, which funded many additional props for use by the Pennsylvania USAR team, the Pennsylvania State Police SERT team, and the Northwest Search and Rescue dogs team. The props brought in by the ERG include multiple dog platforms, a rubble pile, and confined space and trench simulators.
