= Greene Township, Erie County, Pennsylvania =

Township in Pennsylvania, US

Coordinates: 41°59′59″N 79°56′59″W

Greene Township
- Township
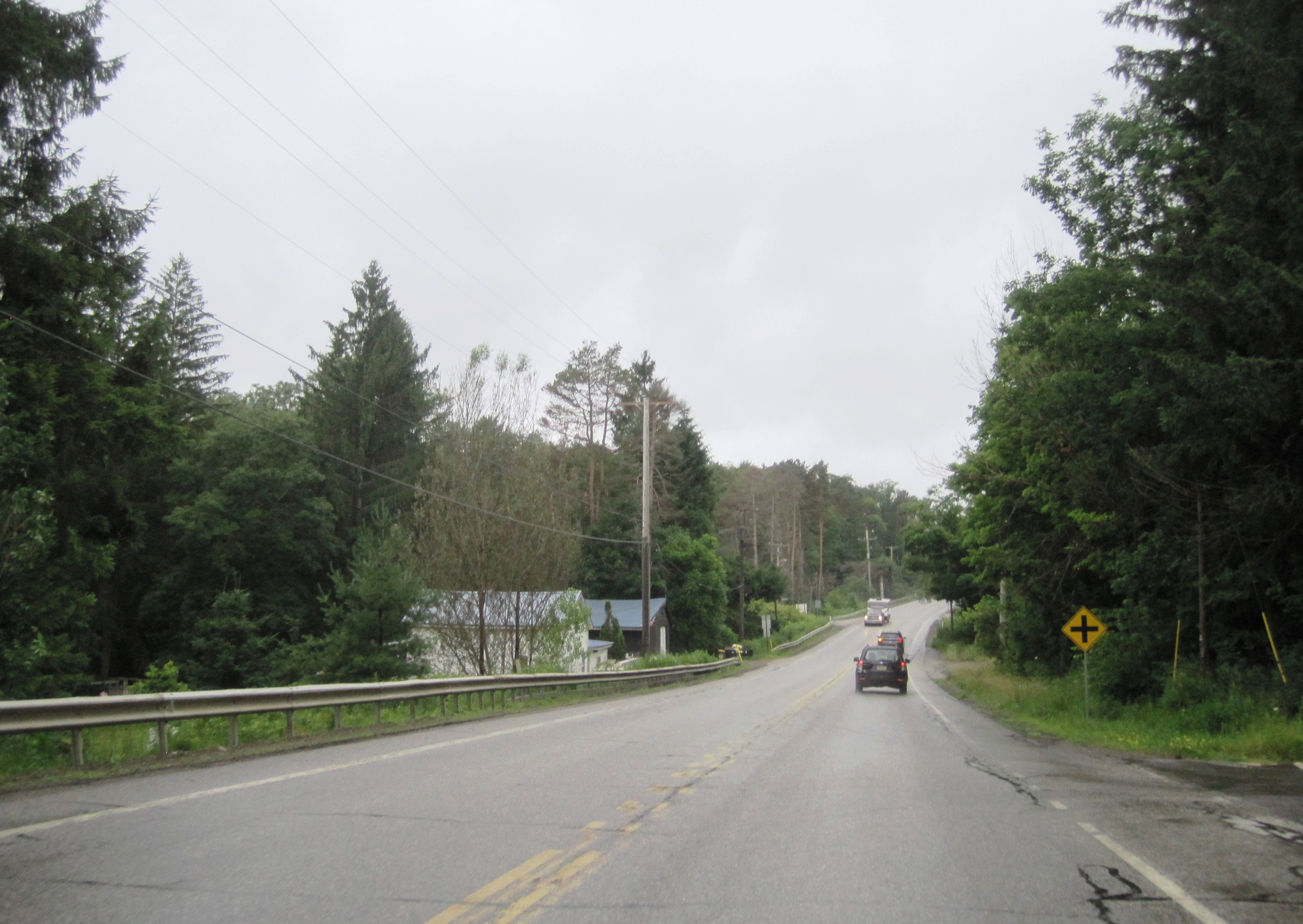
- PA 8 northbound at Bogus Corners within Greene Township

- Flag Seal Logo

- Location in Erie County and the U.S. state of Pennsylvania
- Country: United States
- State: Pennsylvania
- County: Erie

Area
  - Total: 37.51 sq mi (97.14 km^{2})
  - Land: 37.39 sq mi (96.83 km^{2})
  - Water: 0.12 sq mi (0.31 km^{2})
- Highest elevation (west of State Game Lands #161): 1,586 ft (483 m)
- Lowest elevation (Fourmile Creek): 985 ft (300 m)

Population (2020)
  - Total: 4,486 ▼
  - Estimate (2024): 4,438
  - Density: 123.3/sq mi (47.59/km^{2})
- Time zone: UTC-4 (EST)
  - Summer (DST): UTC-5 (EDT)
- Area code: 814
- FIPS code: 42-049-30936
- Website: www.mygreenetownship.com

Greene Township is a township in Erie County, Pennsylvania, United States. The population was 4,486 at the 2020, down from 4,706 at the 2010 census.

== Geography ==
Greene Township is in east-central Erie County, 10 miles (16 km) southeast of downtown Erie. According to the United States Census Bureau, the township has a total area of 37.5 square miles (97.1 km^{2}), of which 37.4 square miles (96.8 km^{2}) is land and 0.1 square miles (0.3 km^{2}), or 0.32%, is water.

== Demographics ==
Historical population
Census	Pop.	Note	%±
2000	4,768		—
2010	4,706		−1.3%
2020	4,486		−4.7%
2024 (est.)	4,438		−1.1%
U.S. Decennial Census

As of the census of 2000, there were 4,768 people, 1,724 households, and 1,379 families residing in the township. The population density was 127.0 inhabitants per square mile (49.0/km^{2}). There were 1,784 housing units at an average density of 47.5 per square mile (18.3/km^{2}). The racial makeup of the township was 99.18% White, 0.08% African American, 0.19% Native American, 0.06% Asian, 0.17% from other races, and 0.31% from two or more races. Hispanic or Latino of any race were 0.25% of the population.

There were 1,724 households, out of which 33.8% had children under the age of 18 living with them, 68.7% were married couples living together, 7.7% had a female householder with no husband present, and 20.0% were non-families. 16.8% of all households were made up of individuals, and 6.6% had someone living alone who was 65 years of age or older. The average household size was 2.76 and the average family size was 3.10.

In the township the population was spread out, with 25.4% under the age of 18, 6.9% from 18 to 24, 27.1% from 25 to 44, 28.0% from 45 to 64, and 12.7% who were 65 years of age or older. The median age was 40 years. For every 100 females there were 103.6 males. For every 100 females age 18 and over, there were 103.1 males.

The median income for a household in the township was $49,030, and the median income for a family was $53,096. Males had a median income of $38,994 versus $23,350 for females. The per capita income for the township was $18,694. About 2.9% of families and 4.1% of the population were below the poverty line, including 5.7% of those under age 18 and 6.0% of those age 65 or over.
