= Northwestern Senior High School (Pennsylvania) =

Coordinates: 41.88903°N 80.35343°W

Location
- 100 Harthan Way; Albion, Pennsylvania 16401; United States

Information
- School type: Public, secondary
- School district: Northwestern School District
- Superintendent: Greg Lehman
- Principal: Natalie Herath, Robert Stauffer
- Teaching staff: 28.64 (FTE)
- Grades: 9-12
- Enrollment: 413 (2023–2024)
- Student to teacher ratio: 14.42
- Campus type: rural
- Colors: red black
- Mascot: Wildcat
- Team name: Wildcats
- Website: www.nwsd.org

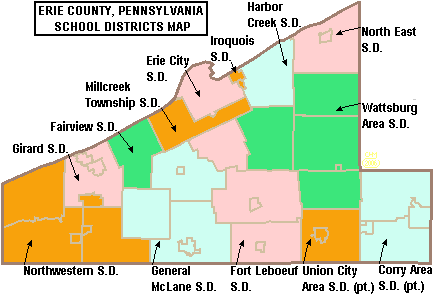
A map of the school district

Northwestern Senior High School is the westernmost active high school in Erie County, Pennsylvania.

Its student body is approximately 451. The school serves the boroughs of Albion, Platea, Cranesville, Springfield Township, Conneaut Township, and Elk Creek Township.

Notable alumni include John Williams, a 1972 Olympics gold medal winner archery champion, who was born in Cranesville; and David Lohr, a 1992 graduate who is a crime journalist for Discovery Communications, truTV and AOL.
