= Girard Township, Erie County, Pennsylvania =

Township in Pennsylvania, US

Coordinates: 41°58′00″N 80°20′59″W

Girard Township
- Township
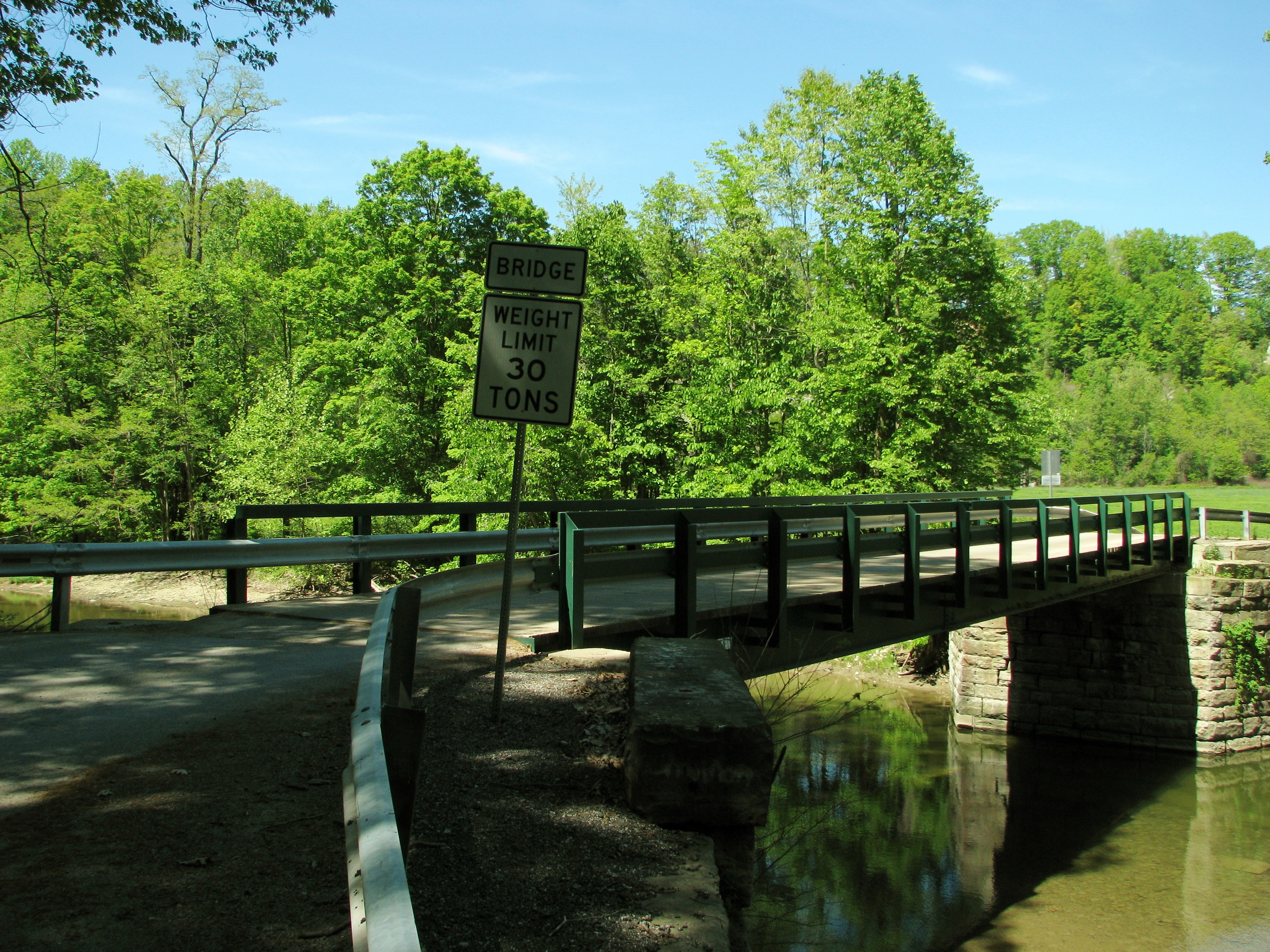
- Bridge on Gudgeonville Road
- Etymology: Stephen Girard
- Motto: "Erie County's Community of Vision"
- Location in Erie County and the U.S. state of Pennsylvania
- Country: United States
- State: Pennsylvania
- County: Erie

Area
  - Total: 31.75 sq mi (82.23 km^{2})
  - Land: 31.50 sq mi (81.58 km^{2})
  - Water: 0.25 sq mi (0.65 km^{2})
- Highest elevation (southeast corner): 1,100 ft (340 m)
- Lowest elevation (Lake Erie): 572 ft (174 m)

Population (2020)
  - Total: 4,872 ▼
  - Estimate (2024): 4,800
  - Density: 156.8/sq mi (60.56/km^{2})
- Time zone: UTC-4 (EST)
  - Summer (DST): UTC-5 (EDT)
- Area code: 814
- FIPS code: 42-049-29240
- Website: www.girardtownship.com

Girard Township is a township in Erie County, Pennsylvania, United States. The population was 4,872 at the 2020 census, down from the population of 5,102 at the 2010 census.

== History ==
The Gudgeonville Covered Bridge was listed on the National Register of Historic Places in 1980.

== Geography ==
The township is in western Erie County, bordered by Lake Erie to the north, Fairview Township and Franklin Township to the east, Elk Creek Township and Conneaut Township to the south, and Springfield Township to the west. In addition, Girard Township surrounds the boroughs of Lake City and Girard and is bordered to the south by the borough of Platea.

According to the United States Census Bureau, the township has a total area of 31.7 square miles (82.2 km^{2}), of which 31.5 square miles (81.6 km^{2}) is land and 0.2 square miles (0.6 km^{2}), or 0.79%, is water. Elk Creek flows through the township from the east to its mouth at Lake Erie in the northwest part of the township.

Interstate 90 crosses the southeastern part of the township, with access from Exit 9 near Platea. U.S. Route 20 crosses the center of the township, passing through Girard, and Pennsylvania Route 5 crosses the northern section, close to Lake Erie, passing through Lake City. Pennsylvania Route 18 runs north–south through the township, connecting the three boroughs.

== Demographics ==
Historical population
Census	Pop.	Note	%±
2000	5,133		—
2010	5,102		−0.6%
2020	4,872		−4.5%
2024 (est.)	4,800		−1.5%
U.S. Decennial Census

As of the census of 2000, there were 5,133 people, 1,955 households, and 1,429 families residing in the township. The population density was 161.6 inhabitants per square mile (62.4/km^{2}). There were 2,073 housing units at an average density of 65.2 per square mile (25.2/km^{2}). The racial makeup of the township was 98.93% White, 0.19% African American, 0.16% Native American, 0.19% Asian, 0.04% Pacific Islander, 0.06% from other races, and 0.43% from two or more races. Hispanic or Latino of any race were 0.27% of the population.

There were 1,955 households, out of which 35.4% had children under the age of 18 living with them, 59.4% were married couples living together, 9.4% had a female householder with no husband present, and 26.9% were non-families. 22.8% of all households were made up of individuals, and 8.8% had someone living alone who was 65 years of age or older. The average household size was 2.62 and the average family size was 3.08.

In the township the population was spread out, with 27.1% under the age of 18, 6.7% from 18 to 24, 30.5% from 25 to 44, 24.5% from 45 to 64, and 11.2% who were 65 years of age or older. The median age was 37 years. For every 100 females, there were 98.1 males. For every 100 females age 18 and over, there were 92.5 males.

The median income for a household in the township was $39,125, and the median income for a family was $43,244. Males had a median income of $33,043 versus $24,275 for females. The per capita income for the township was $17,222. About 5.5% of families and 6.5% of the population were below the poverty line, including 7.5% of those under age 18 and 4.2% of those age 65 or over.
