= Northwestern School District =

School district in Pennsylvania

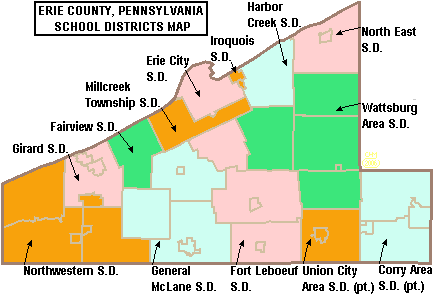

Location
- 100 Harthan Way, Albion, Pennsylvania Erie County; United States

District information
- Type: Public

Students and staff
- Colors: Red and Black

Other information
- Website: www.nwsd.org

Northwestern School District is a small, rural, public school district based in Albion, Pennsylvania, United States. The district is located in Erie County, which is in the northwestern corner of Pennsylvania bordering Lake Erie and the State of Ohio. Northwestern School District encompasses approximately 122 square miles (320 km^{2}). Three boroughs (Albion, Cranesville, and Platea) and three townships (Conneaut, Elk Creek, and Springfield) are served by the Northwestern School District.

According to 2000 federal census data, Northwestern School District serves a resident population of 11,767. In 2009, the district residents’ per capita income was $13,725, while the median family income was $41,810. In the Commonwealth, the median family income was $49,501 and the United States median family income was $49,445, in 2010.

In 2025 the board of trustees voted in favor of building an athletic facility; 5 voted for, and 4 against.

== Schools ==
The district operates four schools. Three are located in Albion, while one is located in the unincorporated community of East Springfield (Springfield Township).

- Grades 9-12
  - Northwestern High School (Albion)
- Grades 6-8
  - Northwestern Middle School (Albion)
- Grades K-5
  - Northwestern Elementary School (Albion)
  - Springfield Elementary School (East Springfield).
