= Waterford Covered Bridge =

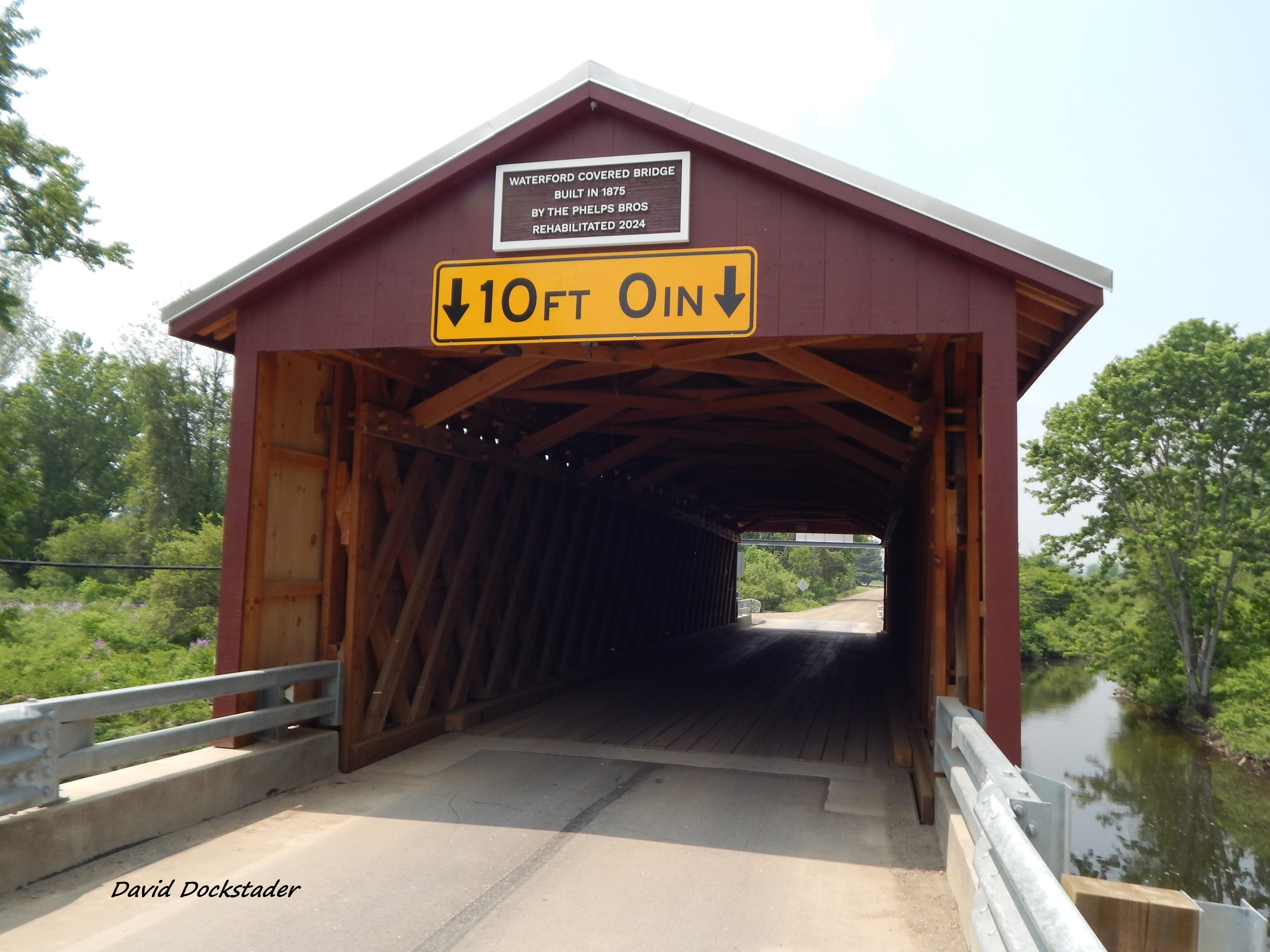
- The bridge in June 2025
- Coordinates: 41°56′28″N 79°57′48″W
- Carries: Niemeyer Road (T 463)
- Crosses: LeBoeuf Creek
- Locale: Erie, Pennsylvania, United States
- Other name(s): Wattsburg Road, Old Kissing, Brotherton
- Maintained by: Waterford Township
- NBI number: 000000000016497

Characteristics
- Total length: 85.9 ft (26.2 m)
- Width: 14 ft (4.3 m)
- Height: 10.3 ft (3.1 m)
- Clearance above: 10 ft 0 in (3.05 m)

History
- Constructed by: Charles and James Phelps
- Built: 1875
- Rebuilt: 2024
- Closed: 2011–2024
- Waterford Covered Bridge
- U.S. National Register of Historic Places
- MPS: Covered Bridges of Erie County TR
- NRHP reference No.: 80003492
- Added to NRHP: September 17, 1980

Location
- Interactive map of Waterford Covered Bridge

The Waterford Covered Bridge is a Town lattice truss covered bridge spanning LeBoeuf Creek in Waterford Township, Erie County in the U.S. state of Pennsylvania. The bridge was built in 1875, and is 85 feet 11 inches (26.2 m) in length. The Waterford Covered Bridge is one of two remaining covered bridges in Erie County, along with the Harrington Covered Bridge. The bridge is also the only Town lattice truss bridge in the county and one of only 19 in Pennsylvania. It was documented by the Historic American Buildings Survey in 1936 and was listed on the National Register of Historic Places in 1980. In 2011, the bridge was closed due to its deteriorating condition. Bridge was rebuilt and then reopened in November 2024.

== Design ==
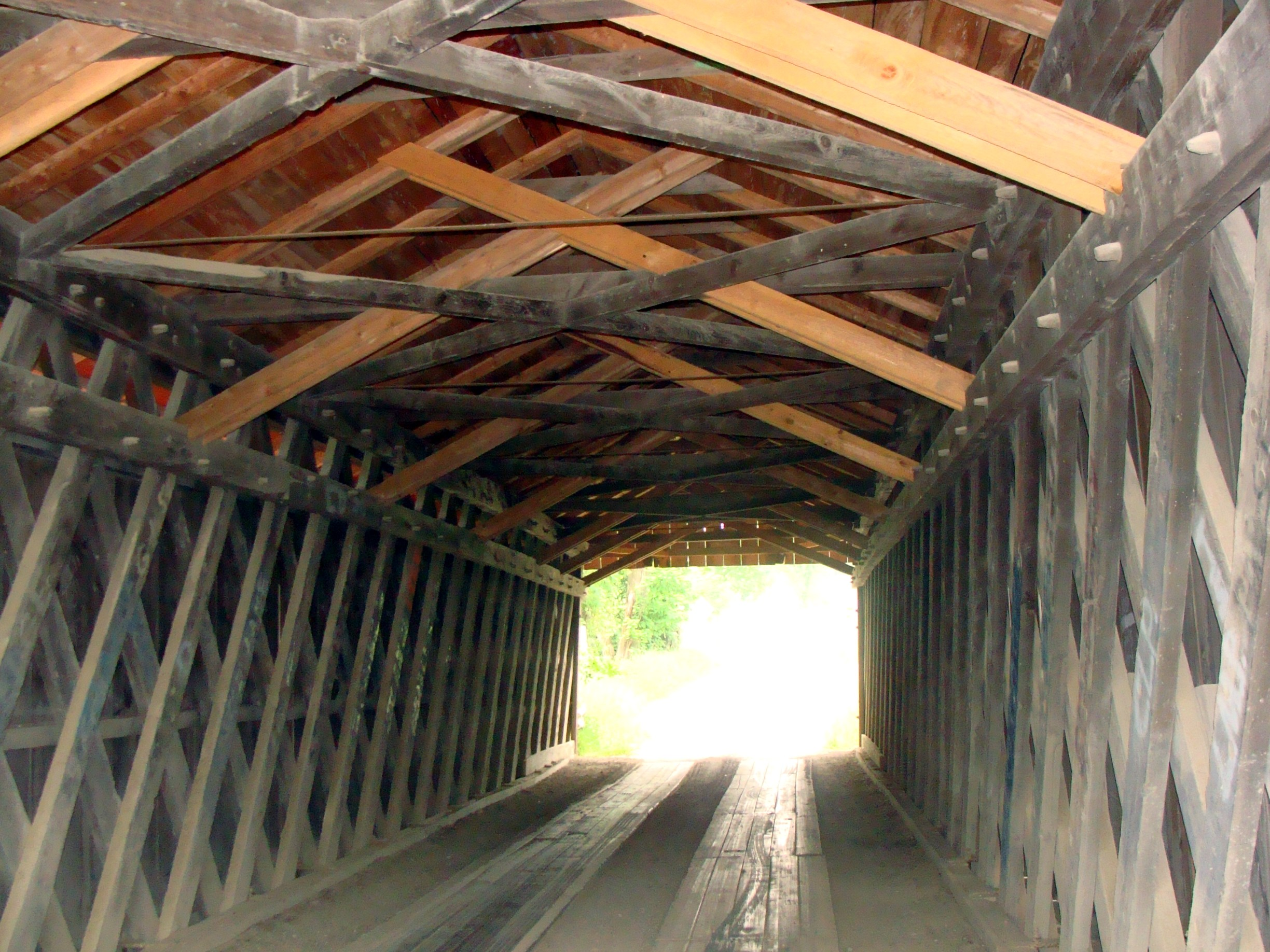
The interior of the Waterford Covered Bridge.

The Waterford Covered Bridge is situated southeast of the borough of Waterford in Waterford Township. The bridge spans the 78 feet (24 m) over LeBoeuf Creek, and has an overall length of 85 feet 11 inches (26.2 m). It is 15 feet 1 inch (4.6 m) wide and carries a single lane of Niemeyer Road (Township Road 463). The road deck itself is 13 feet 5 inches (4.1 m) wide, and is made up of "transverse decking" and a pair of 2-foot-wide (1 m), linear runners to reduce the noise from loose boards and to guide automobiles. The bridge only has clearance of 10 feet 4 inches (3.1 m), which has played a role in repeated collisions by oversized vehicles.

The bridge was designed by Richard Cross using a Town lattice truss. The truss consists of a lattice of beams crossing at 45 to 60-degree angles and connected by wooden pins. There are only nineteen bridges remaining in Pennsylvania using the Town lattice, and the Waterford Covered Bridge is only one in Erie County. It is the also the only covered bridge in the county to have been painted, with the exterior of the bridge painted barn red. The bridge also has "an unusual, blue, metal pipe structure" attached to the abutments on the bridge's south side. The structure is supported with a king post framework and, presumably, connects to nearby pipelines.

Originally, a white sign was mounted above each portal that declared "Old Kissing Bridge built in 1875 by the Phelps Bros." Sometime in the mid-2000s, the sign was taken down. When the bridge was closed, large "Bridge Closed" signs were mounted in the same location with concrete barricades placed across the road on the bridge's approaches.

== History ==
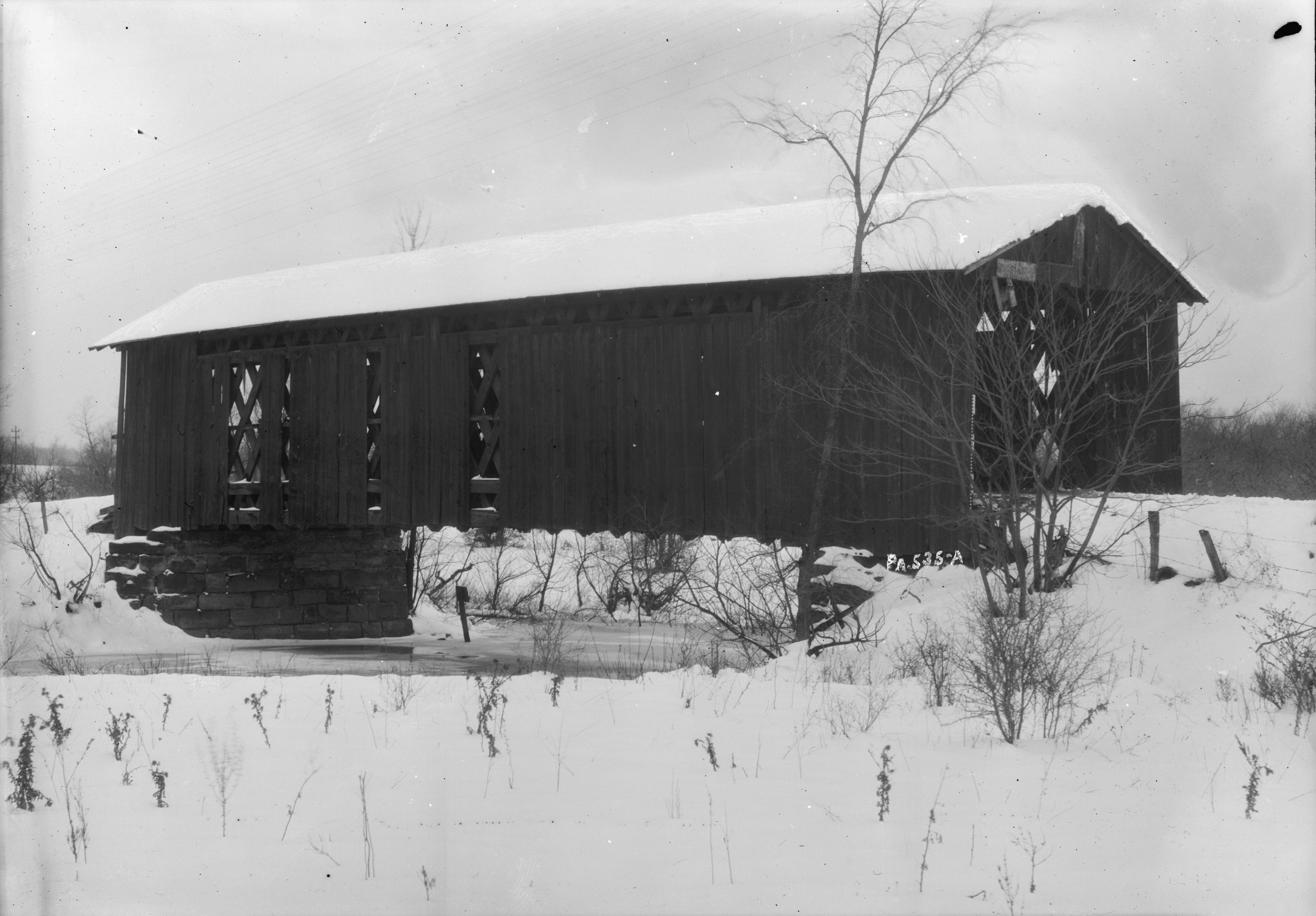
HABS/HAER photo of the Waterford Covered Bridge in 1936.

The first covered bridge in the United States was built in 1805 over the Schuylkill River in Philadelphia, Pennsylvania. By the end of the 19th century, over 1,500 covered bridges were constructed across the state. In 1820, Ithiel Town patented his namesake lattice truss. The truss became particularly popular as it used smaller piece of lumber instead of the larger, heavier timbers that were more expensive to fabricate, and could easily be built by relatively unskilled builders. It was also strong enough that it became appropriated for using in wooden and iron railroad bridges.

The Waterford Covered Bridge was built in 1875 by the brothers Charles and James Phelps. An eyewitness to the construction recounted in 1936 that it took approximately two months to complete.

In 2001, Waterford Township was given a $54,000 grant by the Pennsylvania Historical and Museum Commission (PHMC) to replace the rafters, roofing, and shake shingles on the bridge.

=== Modern use and status ===
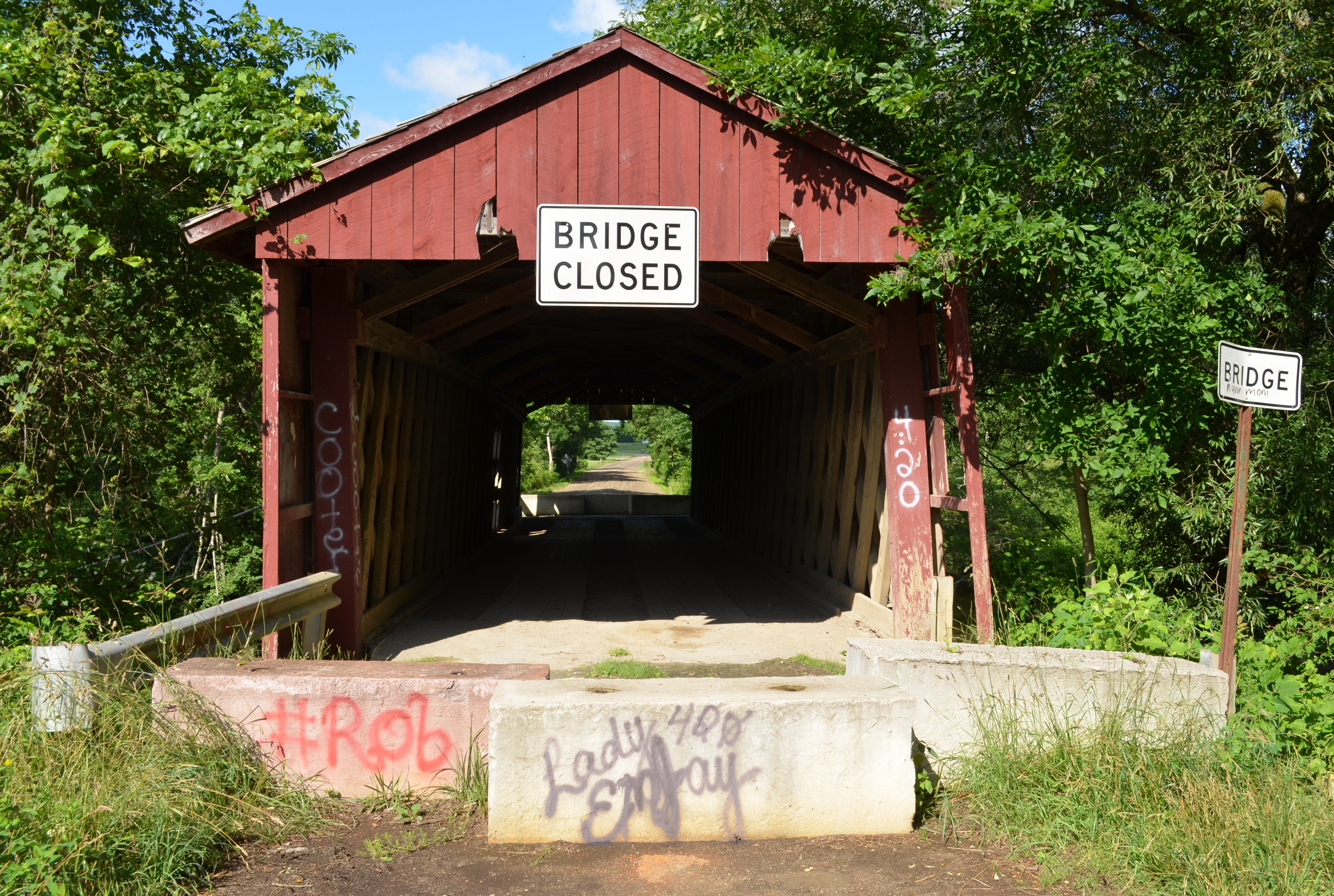
The Waterford Covered Bridge, in 2014, closed to traffic.

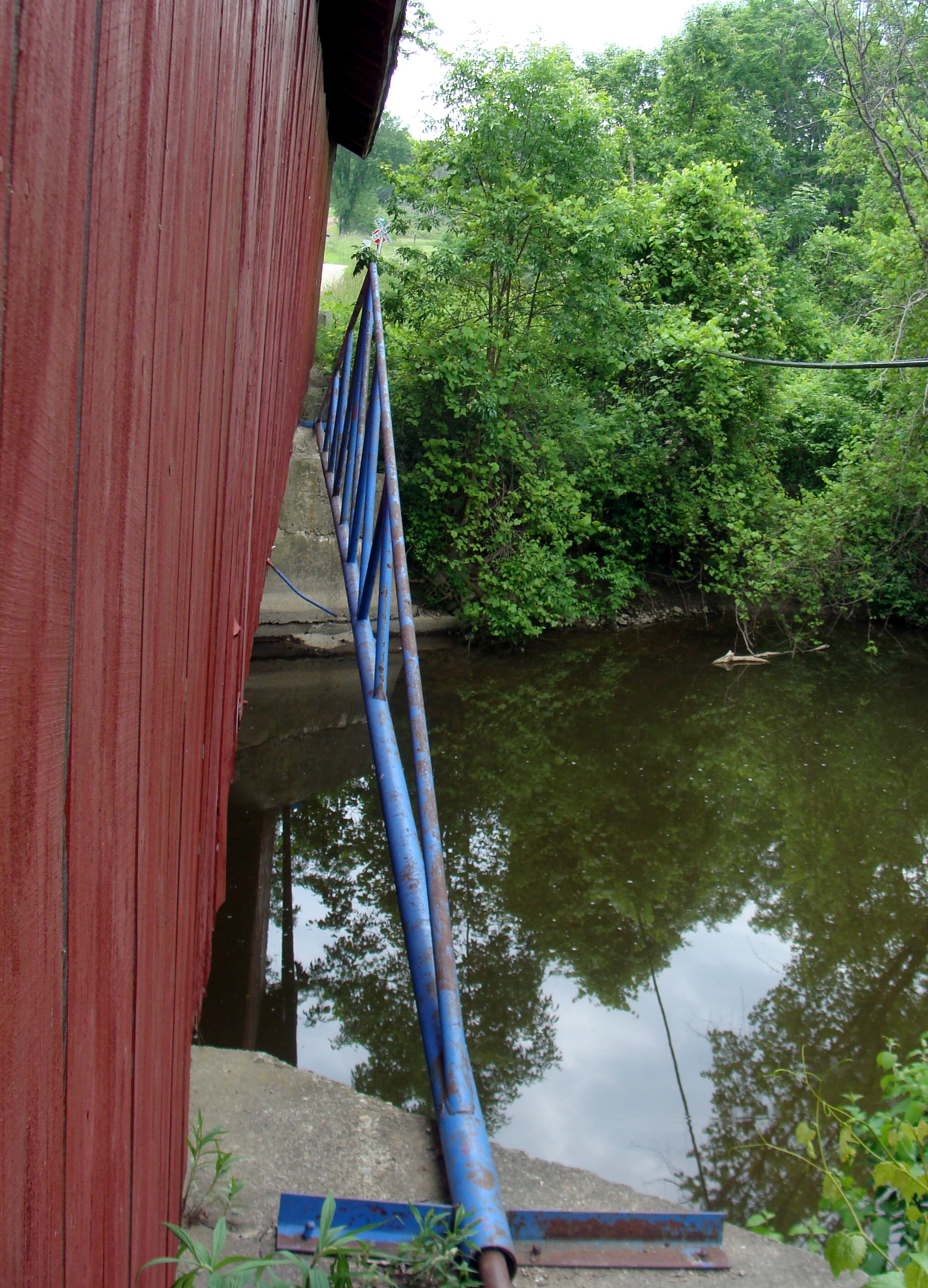
The south side of the Waterford Covered Bridge. Note the blue pipe structure.

As of 2014, they are only two covered bridges in Erie County— the Waterford Covered Bridge and the Harrington Covered Bridge; both the Carman Covered Bridge and Gudgeonville Covered Bridge were lost to arsons in 1996 and 2008, respectively. The bridge has been damaged by oversized trucks attempting to cross it with the first incident occurring on June 17, 2003 involving a box truck. Another incident on December 9, 2005 involved a FedEx truck that was 8 inches (20 cm) taller than the bridge's posted clearance and 3,580 pounds (1,620 kg) over the posted load limit, at the time, of 3 short tons (2.7 metric tons). Several of the bridge's deck planks, support beams, and cross pieces were damaged, although the bridge's integrity was not compromised and was never closed to traffic. It has also been subjected to repeated vandalism with graffiti marking bridge surfaces. At one point, a deer carcass was even found hanging from the bridge's rafters.

After an assessment by state and federal highway officials in 2014, the Waterford Covered Bridge was found to need a substantial refurbishment before it could be safely reopened. Structural boards were found to be missing or loose, and the entire substructure needing to be replaced. PennDOT also proposed an overhead bar ahead of the bridge to prevent oversize trucks from reaching it, as well as lighting and security cameras to deter vandals.

== See also ==
- List of bridges on the National Register of Historic Places in Pennsylvania
- National Register of Historic Places listings in Erie County, Pennsylvania

== Sources ==
- Baxter, Annie Scott (December 21, 1936). "Waterford Covered Bridge". Historic American Buildings Survey. National Park Service. HABS PA-535.
- Breon, Laura (July 2, 2003). "Truck smacks Kissing Bridge". Erie Times-News.
- Claridge, John R (December 27, 1979). "Covered Bridges of Erie County TR: Waterford Covered Bridge" (PDF). National Register of Historic Places—Nomination Form. National Park Service.
- Hahn, Tim (December 11, 2005). "FedEx truck smacks into historic 'Kissing Bridge'". Erie Times-News. pp. 1B, 6B.
- Evans, Benjamin D; Evans, June R (2001). Pennsylvania's Covered Bridges: A Complete Guide (2nd ed.). Pittsburgh: University of Pittsburgh Press. ISBN 0-8229-5764-7.
- Wagner, Paul (April 11, 2014). "Plans to Repair and Reopen Waterford Covered Bridge". WICU-TV/WSEE-TV.
- Zacher, Susan M (1986). The Covered Bridges of Pennsylvania: A Guide (Revised ed.). Harrisburg: Pennsylvania Historical and Museum Commission. ISBN 0-89271-019-5.
