= Hugo López (basketball) =

Spanish professional basketball coach

Liaoning Flying Leopards
- Position: Head coach
- League: Chinese Basketball Association

Personal information
- Born: 29 July 1975 (age 51) Valladolid, Spain

Career information
- High school: Northwestern SHS (Albion, Pennsylvania)

Career history

Coaching
- 2000–2001: Northwestern SHS (assistant)
- 2001–2002: Edinboro University
- 2002–2009: Villa de Los Barrios (assistant)
- 2009–2011: Gipuzkoa (assistant)
- 2011–2014: Real Madrid (assistant)
- 2014: Malabo Kings
- 2015: Fuenlabrada
- 2015–2016: Halifax Hurricanes
- 2016–2017: Rec do Libolo
- 2018–2021: Sweden
- 2019–2021: Real Valladolid
- 2021–2022: Tokyo Z
- 2022–2023: Liaoning Flying Leopards (assistant)
- 2023–2024: Liaoning Flying Leopards
- 2024–2026: Liaoning Flying Leopards (assistant)
- 2026: Liaoning Flying Leopards (interim)
- 2026–present: Liaoning Flying Leopards

Career highlights
- 2× CBA champion (2023, 2024); NBL Canada Coach of the Year (2016); CBA All-Star Game Northern Division head coach (2024)

Hugo López Muñoz (born 29 July 1975) is a Spanish professional basketball coach, currently serving as the head coach for the Liaoning Flying Leopards in the Chinese Basketball Association (CBA). López was previously also head coach of the Sweden national team from 2018 until 2021, and has coached many others throughout his career.

== Playing career ==
López was trained in the sport of basketball with Fórum Valladolid and Northwestern Senior High School in Albion, Pennsylvania.

== Coaching career ==
López began his career as an assistant basketball coach at his alma mater Northwestern High School in the United States in 2000. He remained in the country for the following season, coaching Edinboro University of Pennsylvania. In 2002, López moved back to his home country of Spain and began serving as an assistant under various head coaches for CB Villa de Los Barrios until 2009. In his final season there, he landed the same job with the Liga ACB team Lagun Aro GBC, where the head coach was Pablo Laso. In 2014, López moved to the Malabo Kings of the Equatoguinean League in Africa. In January 2015, López was named the head coach of Baloncesto Fuenlabrada in the ACB league in Spain, succeeding Luis Casimiro. He was sacked in April 2015 after not avoiding the relegation positions in the table.

On 30 September 2015, López was appointed the first head coach of the newly created Halifax Hurricanes of the National Basketball League of Canada (NBL). Team CEO Mike Brien said, "We are excited to bring a coach of this caliber to Halifax’s new NBL Canada team." After one season, the Hurricanes and López were unable to reach to come to terms on a new agreement and parted ways.
