= Carman Covered Bridge =

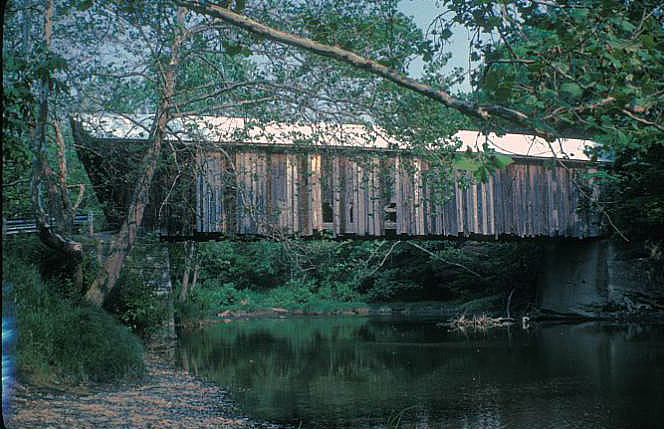
- Coordinates: 41°55′11.7″N 80°25′49.6″W
- Carried: McKee Road (T-338)
- Crossed: Conneaut Creek
- Locale: Springfield / Conneaut Townships, Erie County, Pennsylvania
- Other name(s): Carmen Covered Bridge

Characteristics
- Total length: 75 feet (23 m)
- Width: 14 feet (4.3 m)
- Load limit: 4 short tons (3.6 t)
- Clearance above: 12 feet (3.7 m)

History
- Constructed by: William Sherman
- Built: c. 1870
- Destroyed: April 19, 1996

Former U.S. National Register of Historic Places
- Designated: September 18, 1980
- Delisted: April 28, 1996
- Part of: Covered Bridges of Erie County TR
- Reference no.: 80003493

The Carman Covered Bridge was a covered bridge that spanned Conneaut Creek between Springfield Township and Conneaut Township, Erie County in the U.S. state of Pennsylvania. Listed on the National Register of Historic Places in 1980, it was destroyed by fire in 1996. At the time of its destruction, it was one of four covered bridges in Erie County.

== Design ==
The Carman Covered Bridge was 75 feet (23 m) long and carried McKee Road (Township 338) over Conneaut Creek. It was designed as single-span, multiple King post-truss bridge in 1870 by William Sherman, who also built the nearby Gudgeonville and Harrington covered bridges. The bridge was known for carrying a painted advertisement for the Stines and Wingate Clothing Store, a department store in Conneaut, Ohio that closed in early-20th century, on the north portal.

== History ==
The Carman Covered Bridge was listed on the National Register of Historic Places on September 18, 1980, along with the other covered bridges in Erie County. The covered bridge was destroyed by fire on April 19, 1996. At the time, it was not known if the cause was either a from lightning strike or by arson. The bridge was removed from the National Register of Historic Places later that month. A replacement bridge was not built, with McKee Road terminating at either side of the creek.

== See also ==
- List of covered bridges on the National Register of Historic Places in Pennsylvania
- National Register of Historic Places in Erie County, Pennsylvania

== Sources ==
- Claridge, John R (December 27, 1979). "Covered Bridges of Erie County Thematic Resources". National Register of Historic Places—Nomination Form. National Archives and Records Administration. NAID 71992896.
