= Harrington Covered Bridge =

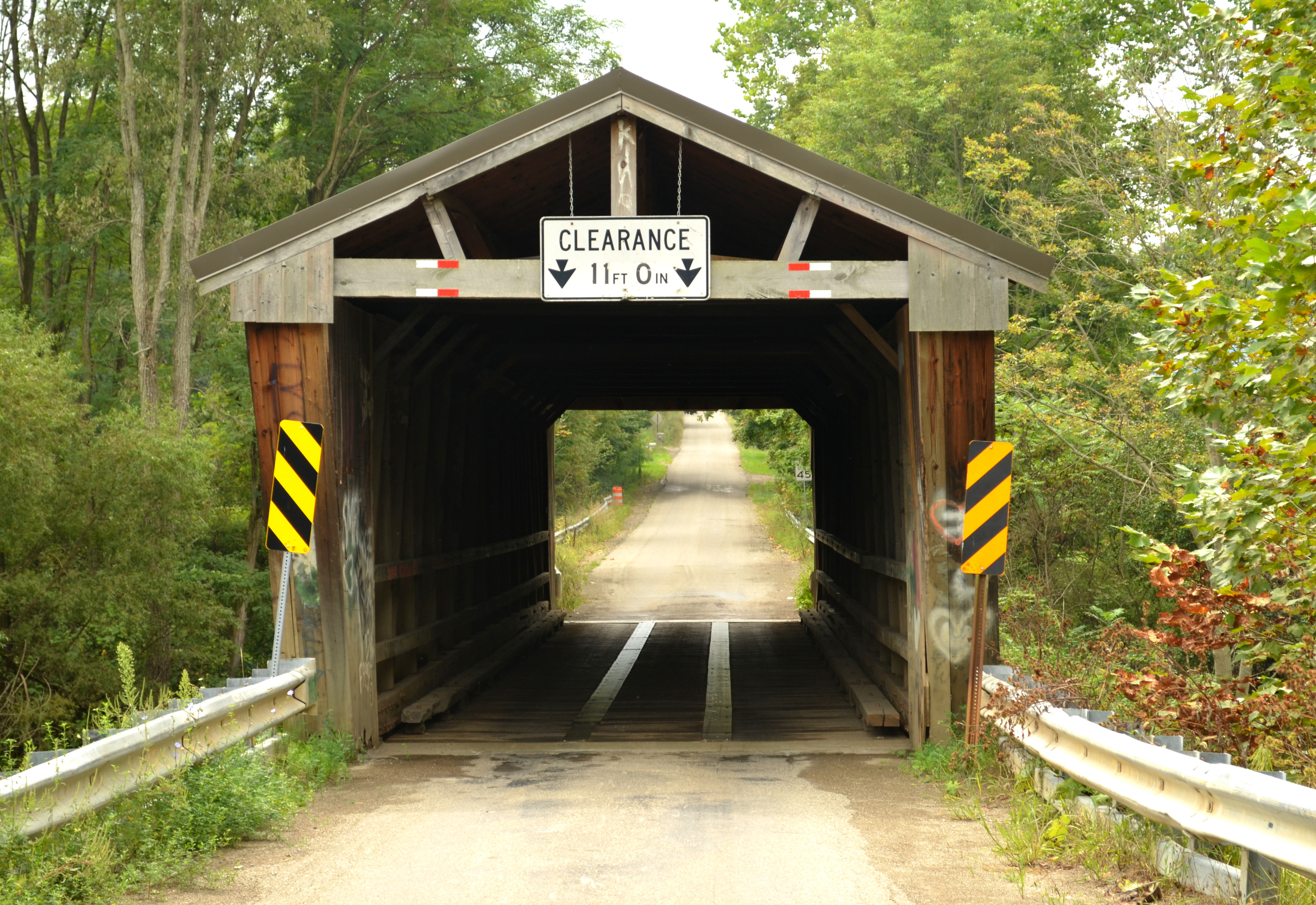
- The bridge in September 2013
- Coordinates: 41°52′8″N 80°25′45″W
- Carries: Barney Road (SR 3003)
- Crosses: Conneaut Creek
- Locale: Conneaut Township, Erie County, Pennsylvania
- Other name: Sherman Covered Bridge

Characteristics
- Design: King post-truss
- Total length: 72 feet (22 m)
- Width: 14 feet (4.3 m)
- Load limit: 4 short tons (3.6 t)
- Clearance above: 10 feet 11 inches (3.33 m)

History
- Constructed by: William Sherman
- Built: 1870

U.S. National Register of Historic Places
- Designated: September 17, 1980
- Part of: Covered Bridges of Erie County TR
- Reference no.: 80003488

Location
- Interactive map of Harrington Covered Bridge

Harrington Covered Bridge is a covered bridge that spans Conneaut Creek in Conneaut Township, Erie County in the U.S. state of Pennsylvania. It was constructed about 1870, and rebuilt in 1962. The Harrington Covered Bridge is one of two remaining covered bridges in Erie County, along with the Waterford Covered Bridge.

The Harrington Covered Bridge is 72 feet (22 m) long and carries Barney Road (State Route 3003) over Conneaut Creek. It was designed as single-span, multiple King post-truss bridge in 1870 by William Sherman, who also built the Gudgeonville and Carman covered bridges that were located nearby. Like the other two covered bridges, it is clad in a unpainted, vertical wooden plank siding.

The Harrington Covered Bridge was listed on the National Register of Historic Places on September 18, 1980 along with the other covered bridges in Erie County.

== See also ==
- List of covered bridges on the National Register of Historic Places in Pennsylvania
- National Register of Historic Places in Erie County, Pennsylvania

== Sources ==
- Claridge, John R (December 27, 1979). "Covered Bridges of Erie County Thematic Resources". National Register of Historic Places—Nomination Form. National Archives and Records Administration. NAID 71992896.
