= Platea, Pennsylvania =

Borough in Pennsylvania, US

- Borough
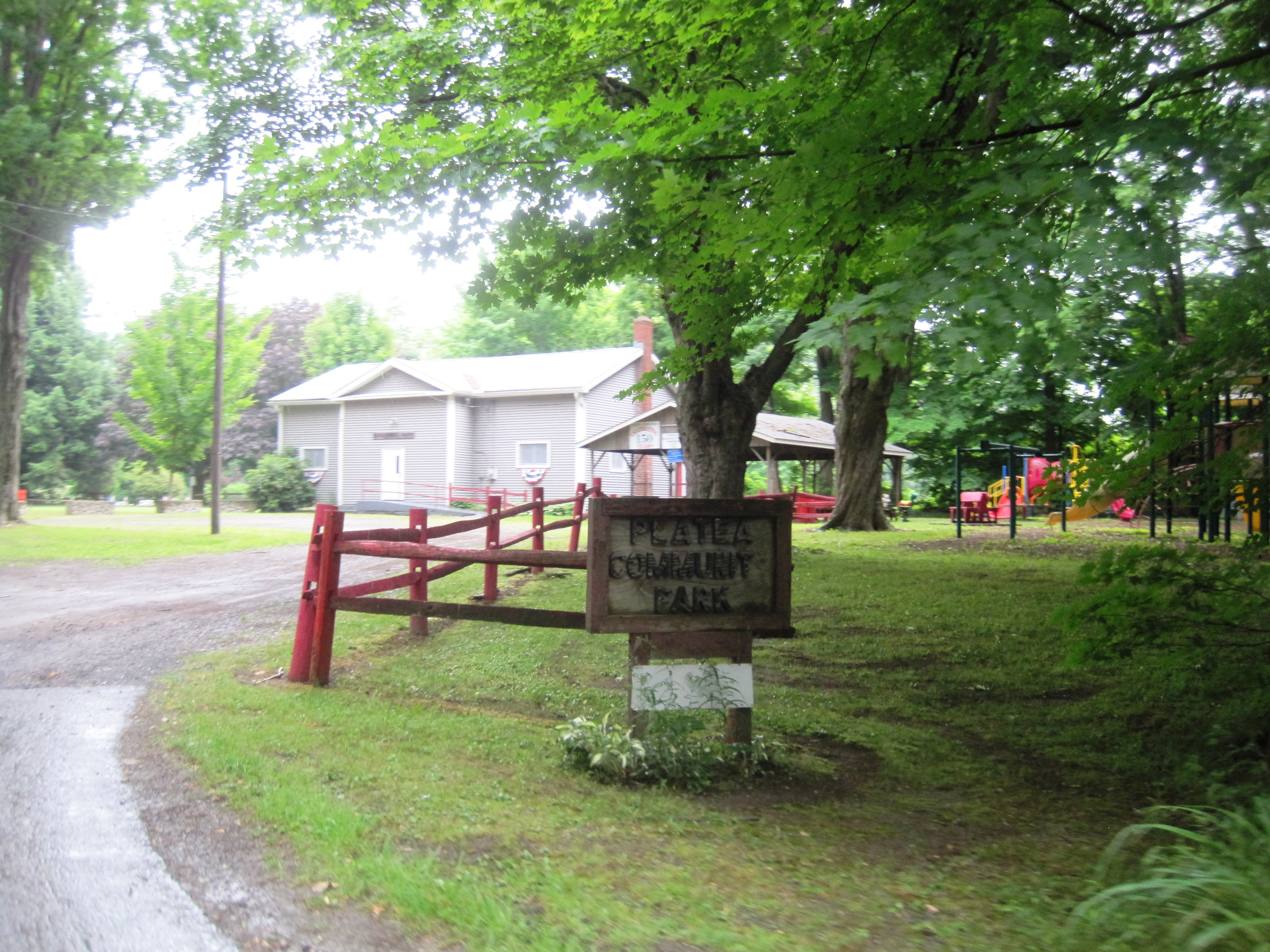
- Borough hall and Community Park

- Location in Erie County and the U.S. state of Pennsylvania.
- Coordinates: 41°57′4″N 80°19′31″W
- Country: United States
- State: Pennsylvania
- County: Erie

Government
  - Mayor: Mike Simpkins

Area
  - Total: 3.34 sq mi (8.66 km^{2})
  - Land: 3.34 sq mi (8.66 km^{2})
  - Water: 0 sq mi (0.00 km^{2})
- Elevation (Borough benchmark): 876 ft (267 m)
- Highest elevation (southeast corner of borough): 990 ft (300 m)
- Lowest elevation (Tributary to Crooked Creek): 780 ft (240 m)

Population (2020)
  - Total: 442
  - Density: 132.2/sq mi (51.05/km^{2})
- Time zone: UTC-4 (EST)
  - Summer (DST): UTC-5 (EDT)
- Area code: 814
- FIPS code: 42-61168

Platea is a borough in Erie County, Pennsylvania, United States. The population was 443 at the 2020 census.

== Geography ==
Platea is located in western Erie County at 41°57′4″N 80°19′31″W (41.951078, -80.325143). It is bordered to the west, north, and east by Girard Township, to the south by Elk Creek Township, and at its southwestern corner by Conneaut Township.

According to the United States Census Bureau, the borough has a total area of 3.4 square miles (8.7 km^{2}), all land.

== Demographics ==
Historical population
| Census | Pop. | Note | %± |
|---|---|---|---|
| 1890 | 240 | | — |
| 1900 | 225 | | −6.2% |
| 1910 | 220 | | −2.2% |
| 1920 | 239 | | 8.6% |
| 1930 | 249 | | 4.2% |
| 1940 | 281 | | 12.9% |
| 1950 | 290 | | 3.2% |
| 1960 | 357 | | 23.1% |
| 1970 | 354 | | −0.8% |
| 1980 | 492 | | 39.0% |
| 1990 | 467 | | −5.1% |
| 2000 | 474 | | 1.5% |
| 2010 | 430 | | −9.3% |
| 2020 | 442 | | 2.8% |
| 2021 (est.) | 441 | ▼ | −0.2% |

As of the census of 2000, there were 474 people, 172 households, and 137 families residing in the borough. The population density was 144.0 inhabitants per square mile (55.6/km^{2}). There were 184 housing units at an average density of 55.9 per square mile (21.6/km^{2}). The racial makeup of the borough was 97.89% White, 0.42% African American, 0.84% from other races, and 0.84% from two or more races. Hispanic or Latino of any race were 1.05% of the population.

There were 172 households, out of which 36.6% had children under the age of 18 living with them, 65.7% were married couples living together, 7.6% had a female householder with no husband present, and 20.3% were non-families. 13.4% of all households were made up of individuals, and 5.2% had someone living alone who was 65 years of age or older. The average household size was 2.76 and the average family size was 3.04.

In the borough the population was spread out, with 25.1% under the age of 18, 6.5% from 18 to 24, 32.5% from 25 to 44, 25.9% from 45 to 64, and 9.9% who were 65 years of age or older. The median age was 38 years. For every 100 females there were 101.7 males. For every 100 females age 18 and over, there were 107.6 males.

The median income for a household in the borough was $38,125, and the median income for a family was $39,063. Males had a median income of $30,078 versus $22,500 for females. The per capita income for the borough was $14,555. About 6.8% of families and 12.9% of the population were below the poverty line, including 24.1% of those under age 18 and 7.8% of those age 65 or over.

== Education ==
Platea is part of the Northwestern School District.
