= Lake LeBoeuf =

Lake in Erie County, Pennsylvania, United States

- Location within Pennsylvania Location within the United States
- Location: Waterford, Pennsylvania
- Coordinates: 41°55′59″N 79°59′13″W
- Type: Glacial
- Primary inflows: Trout Run, LeBoeuf Creek
- Primary outflows: LeBoeuf Creek
- Basin countries: United States
- Managing agency: Waterford Township
- Max. length: 2,535 ft (773 m)
- Max. width: 2,365 ft (721 m)
- Surface area: 0.12 sq mi (0.32 km^{2})
- Surface elevation: 1,166 ft (355 m) above sea level
- Frozen: Late October Early November–March yearly
- Islands: 1
- Settlements: Waterford, Pennsylvania

Lake LeBoeuf is a natural lake that is approximately 70 acres (28 ha) in size. It is located in Waterford Township immediately adjacent to the Borough of Waterford in Erie County, Pennsylvania.

== History and features ==
The lake, with two public boat ramps, is available for public boating and fishing. Fish species in the lake include black crappie, yellow perch, largemouth bass, muskellunge, walleye, and northern pike.

Like all of the glacial lakes in Pennsylvania, Lake LeBoeuf is a kettle lake. It has a muddy, relatively shallow bottom.

Inlets to the lake include Trout Run and LeBoeuf Creek. LeBoeuf Creek is the primary outlet.

In 2014, the Pennsylvania Department of Environmental Protection confirmed the presence of the aquatic invasive species commonly known as round goby at Lake LeBoeuf.
