= LeBoeuf Creek (Pennsylvania) =

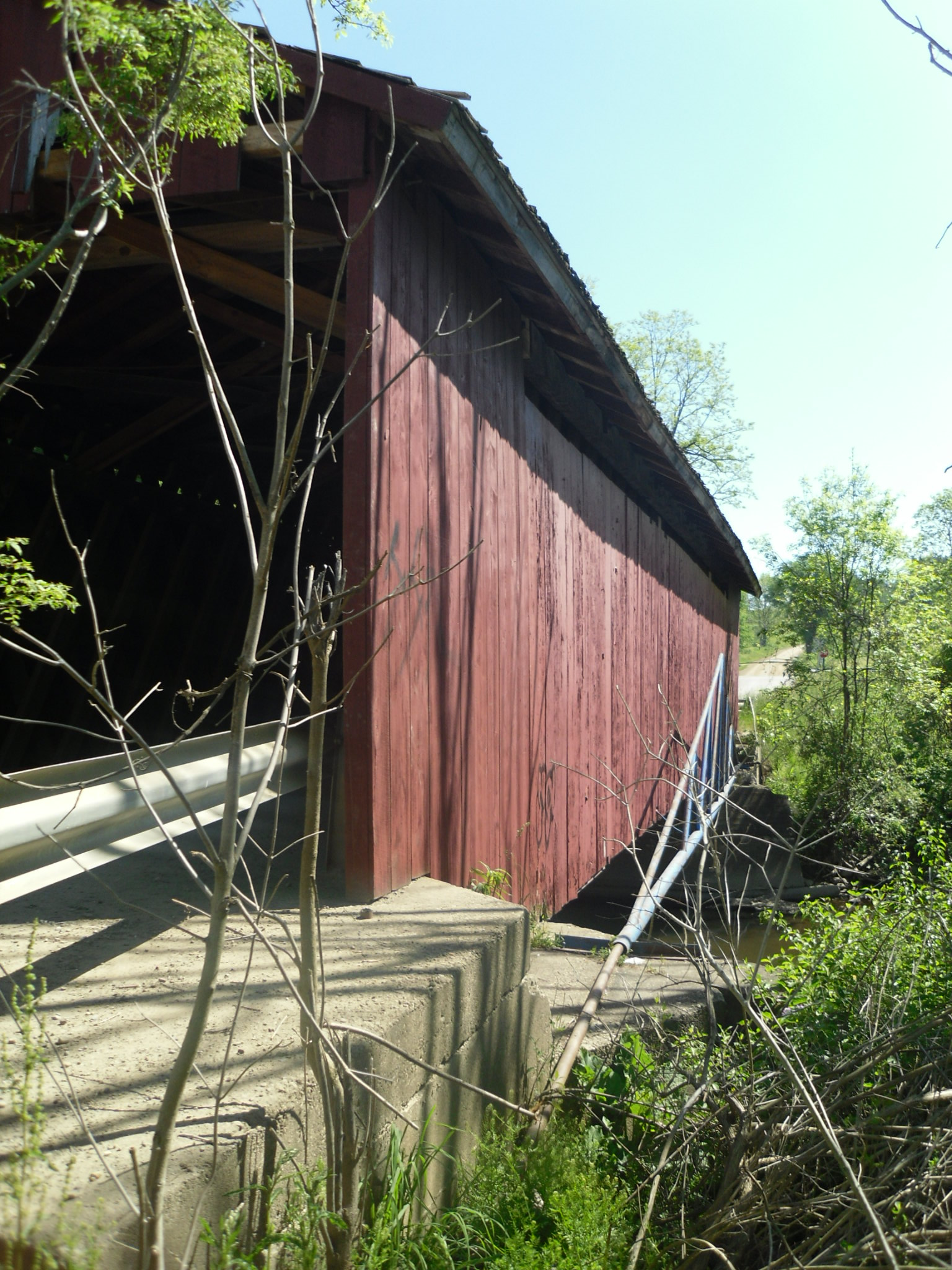

- Location of the mouth of LeBoeuf Creek in Pennsylvania
- Etymology: le bœuf, French for "buffalo"

Location
- Country: United States
- State: Pennsylvania
- County: Erie

Physical characteristics
- Source
  - location: Summit Township, Erie County, Pennsylvania
  - coordinates: 42°1′46″N 80°3′46″W
  - elevation: 1,420 ft (430 m)
- Mouth: French Creek
  - location: Mill Village, Erie County, Pennsylvania
  - coordinates: 41°54′8″N 79°59′9″W
  - elevation: 1,160 ft (350 m)
- Length: 18.0 mi (29.0 km)
- Basin size: 63.6 sq mi (165 km^{2})

Basin features
- Progression: French Creek → Allegheny River → Ohio River → Mississippi River → Gulf of Mexico
- Tributaries
  - left: East Branch LeBoeuf Creek

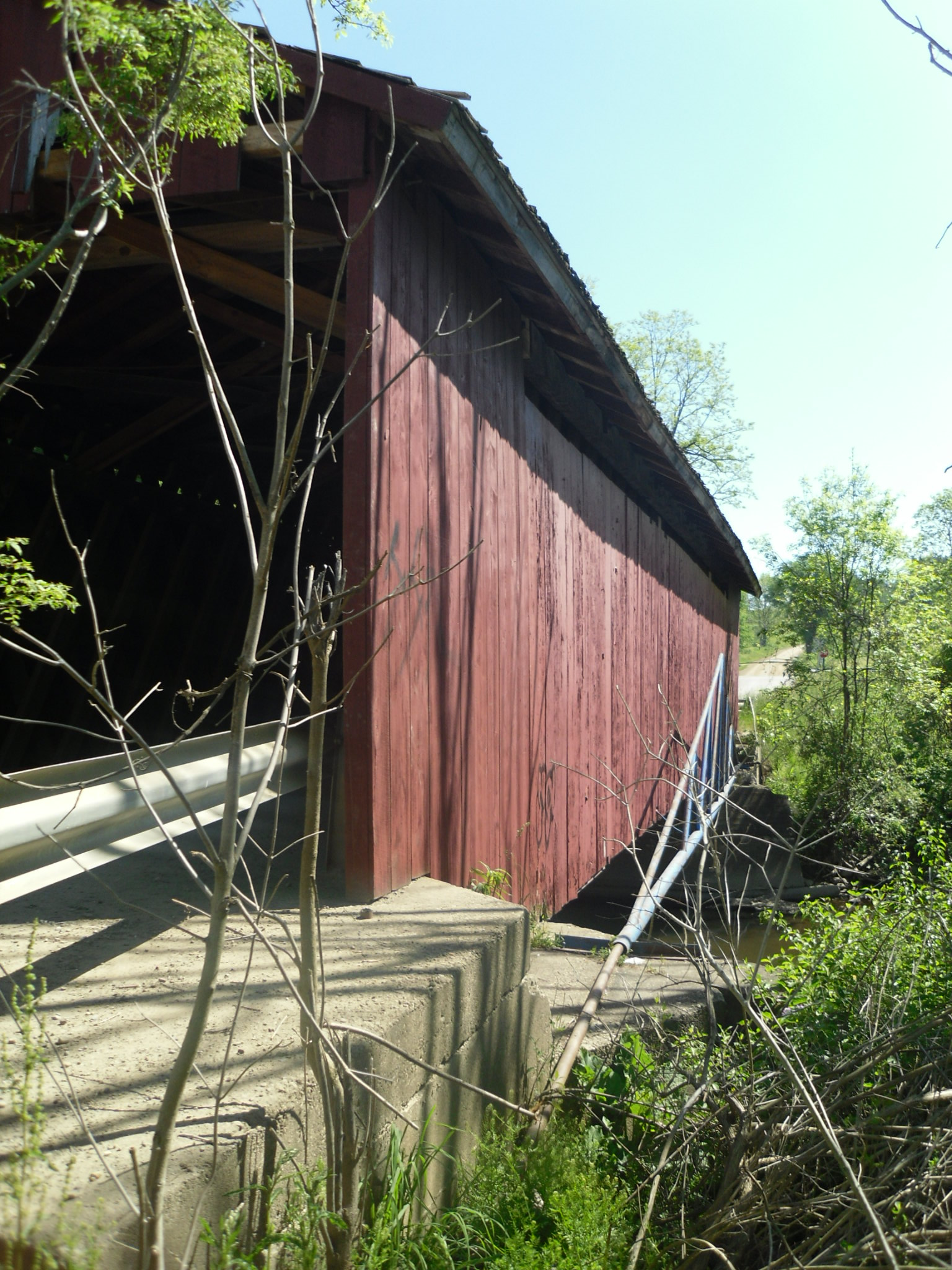
Waterford Covered Bridge

LeBoeuf Creek is an 18-mile (29 km) long tributary of French Creek in Erie County, Pennsylvania in the United States. It has a drainage basin of 63.6 square miles (165 km^{2}).

== Course ==
LeBoeuf Creek originates in Summit Township and meanders south before crossing under U.S. Route 19. Its East Branch tributary originates in Greene Township and flows south until meets with the main branch in Waterford Township. In Waterford, it passes under the Waterford Covered Bridge and heads west, back under US 19 and flows into Lake LeBoeuf. Lake LeBoeuf empties into LeBoeuf Creek at its southern end. The creek crosses under US 19 again and continues south where empties into French Creek near Mill Village.

== History ==
The creek was named for the buffalo at its banks seen by early French pioneers.

In 1753, Fort Le Boeuf was built by Paul Marin de la Malgue along the banks of LeBoeuf Creek, near present-day Waterford, to help protect French interests in the Ohio Country from the British. George Washington was sent by British to Fort Le Boeuf to deliver a message to the French that demanded that they leave the Ohio Country.

== See also ==
- List of rivers of Pennsylvania
- List of tributaries of the Allegheny River
