= Albion, Pennsylvania =

Borough in Pennsylvania, US

- Borough
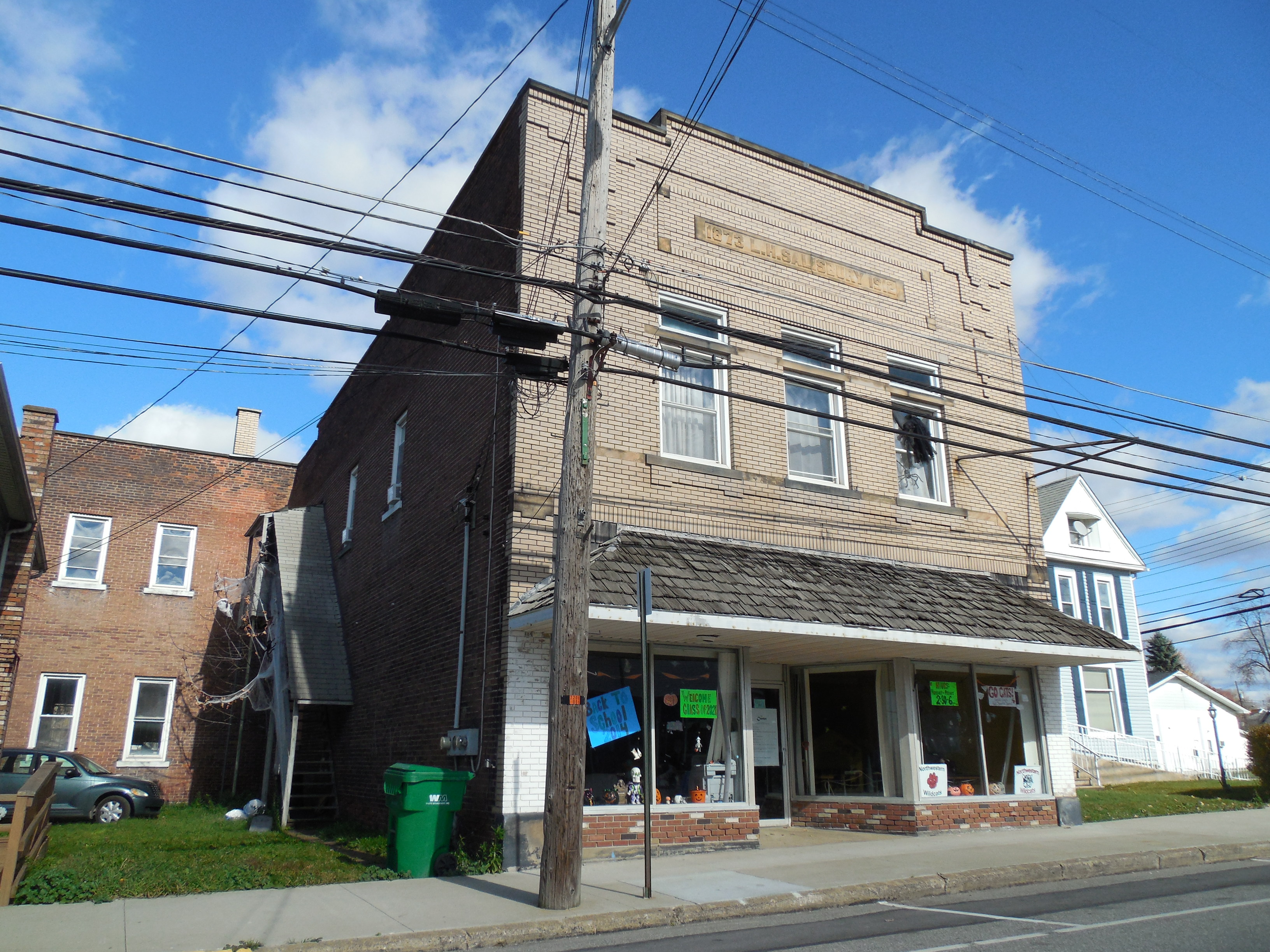
- Youth center in Albion
- Nickname: "The most northwestern borough in Pennsylvania"
- Location in Erie County and the U.S. state of Pennsylvania

- Location in Pennsylvania Location in the United States Location in North America
- Coordinates: 41°53′28″N 80°21′42″W
- Country: United States
- State: Pennsylvania
- County: Erie

Government
  - Mayor: William Rogers

Area
  - Total: 1.09 sq mi (2.83 km^{2})
  - Land: 1.08 sq mi (2.79 km^{2})
  - Water: 0.015 sq mi (0.04 km^{2})
- Elevation (Middle of downtown): 890 ft (270 m)
- Highest elevation (southeast border): 1,000 ft (300 m)
- Lowest elevation (East Branch Conneaut Creek): 840 ft (260 m)

Population (2020)
  - Total: 1,528
  - Density: 1,417.0/sq mi (547.09/km^{2})
- Time zone: UTC-4 (EST)
  - Summer (DST): UTC-5 (EDT)
- ZIP code: 16401
- Area code: 814
- FIPS code: 42-00628
- Website: albionborough.org

Albion is a borough in Erie County, Pennsylvania, United States. As of the 2020 census, Albion had a population of 1,528. It is part of the Erie Metropolitan Statistical Area. One of their main industries is the Albion State Correctional Institute (SCI Albion).

The town was ravaged by an F4 tornado that was part of the 1985 United States-Canada tornado outbreak on May 31, 1985.

== Geography ==
Albion is located in southwestern Erie County and is surrounded by Conneaut Township. According to the United States Census Bureau, the borough has a total area of 1.1 square miles (2.8 km^{2}), of which 0.02 square miles (0.04 km^{2}), or 1.27%, is water.

U.S. Route 6N and Pennsylvania Route 18 pass through the center of Albion. US 6N leads east 12 miles (19 km) to Edinboro and west then north 8 miles (13 km) to West Springfield and Interstate 90. PA 18 leads east out of Albion with US 6N but turns north to Cranesville, a total of 2 miles (3 km) northeast of Albion. In the other direction, PA 18 leads south 22 miles (35 km) to Conneaut Lake. The city of Erie is 28 miles (45 km) northeast via PA 18, Interstate 90, and Interstate 79.

== Demographics ==
Historical population
Census	Pop.	Note	%±
1870	452		—
1880	433		−4.2%
1890	366		−15.5%
1900	695		89.9%
1910	1,534		120.7%
1920	1,549		1.0%
1930	1,681		8.5%
1940	1,604		−4.6%
1950	1,729		7.8%
1960	1,630		−5.7%
1970	1,768		8.5%
1980	1,818		2.8%
1990	1,575		−13.4%
2000	1,607		2.0%
2010	1,516		−5.7%
2020	1,528		0.8%

As of the census of 2010, there were 1,616 people, 701 households, and 425 families residing in the borough. By 2020 the population is predicted to be around 1,700 people. The population density was 1,510.7 inhabitants per square mile (583.3/km^{2}). There were 695 housing units at an average density of 653.4 per square mile (252.3/km^{2}). The racial makeup of the borough was 98.38% White, 0.50% African American, 0.31% Native American, 0.37% Asian, 0.12% from other races, and 0.31% from two or more races. Hispanic or Latino of any race were 1.18% of the population.

There were 655 households, out of which 34.0% had children under the age of 18 living with them, 49.0% were married couples living together, 12.2% had a female householder with no husband present, and 35.0% were non-families. 30.2% of all households were made up of individuals, and 15.4% had someone living alone who was 65 years of age or older. The average household size was 2.45 and the average family size was 3.07.

In the borough the population was spread out, with 28.6% under the age of 18, 6.4% from 18 to 24, 30.4% from 25 to 44, 20.3% from 45 to 64, and 14.2% who were 65 years of age or older. The median age was 35 years. For every 100 females there were 87.3 males. For every 100 females age 18 and over, there were 82.1 males.

The median income for a household in the borough was $33,007, and the median income for a family was $40,650. Males had a median income of $31,620 versus $21,157 for females. The per capita income for the borough was $15,361. About 10.6% of families and 11.8% of the population were below the poverty line, including 14.2% of those under age 18 and 13.4% of those age 65 or over.

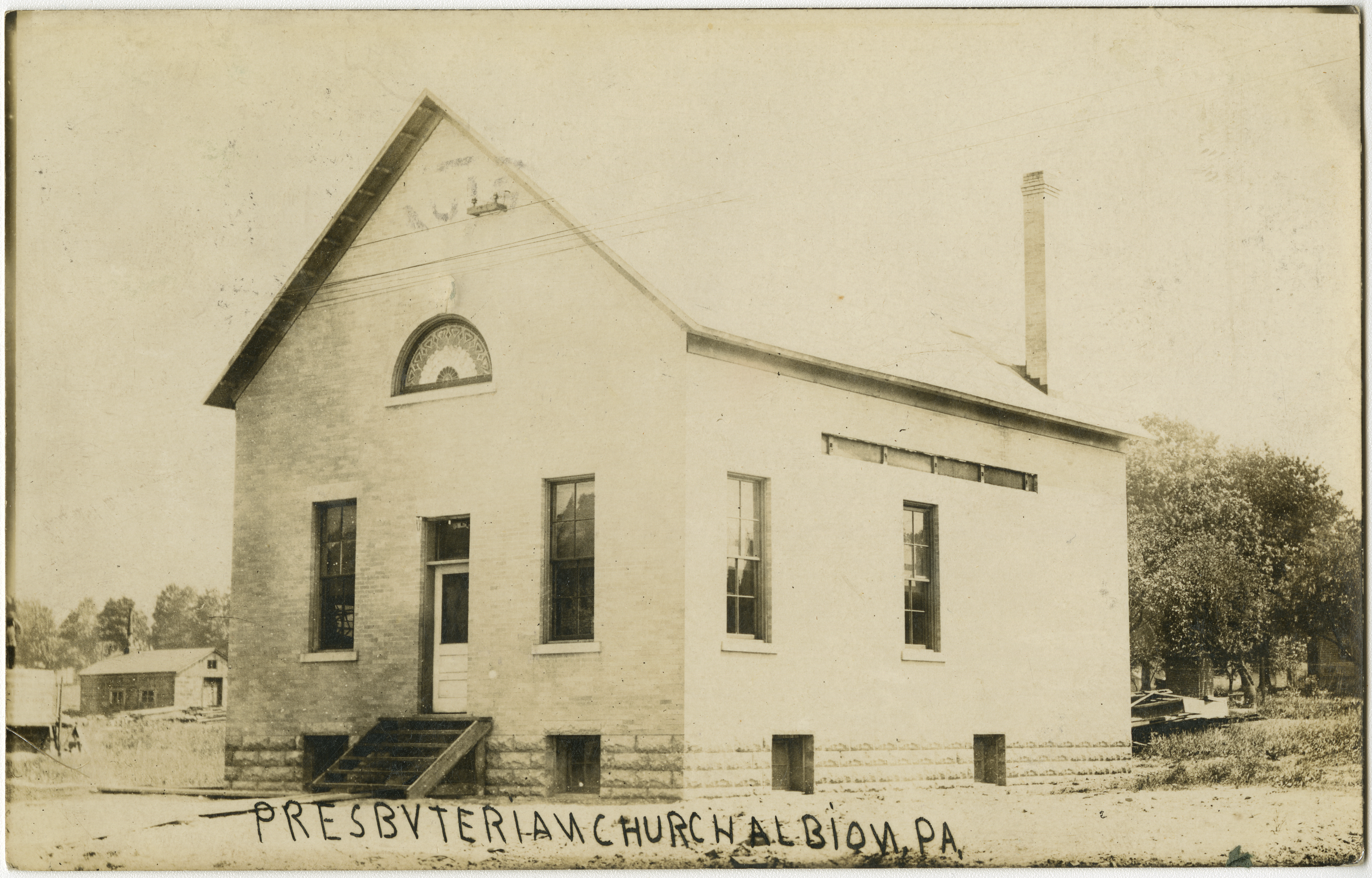
Albion Presbyterian Church from a pre-1923 postcard

== Education ==
Albion is part of the Northwestern School District. The borough has four schools in total. There is the Northwestern Elementary School, the Springfield Elementary School, the Northwestern Middle School, and the Northwestern Senior High School. The team mascot for all four schools is the Northwestern Wildcat, "Willie."

== Sports ==
The Northwestern School District has teams for baseball, softball, volleyball, track and field, cross country, basketball, wrestling and football. The Northwestern Wildcats football teams play their home games at Rogers Field, which is located beside the high school. Youth sports in Albion include Northwestern Little League (baseball and softball) and Northwest Little Gridders Football.

== Nicknames ==
Albion is "the most northwestern borough in Pennsylvania" and is home to "the most northwestern high school in Pennsylvania", which is fitting due to the fact that their high school is called Northwestern.

Albion contains Conneaut Creek and two of its tributaries. Therefore, anglers sometimes refer to Albion as "The country's best trout fishery", due to Conneaut Creek being called that.

== Transportation ==
U.S. Route 6N and State Route 18 pass through Albion.

The Bessemer and Lake Erie Railroad passes through Albion on its way to the P & C Dock Company in Conneaut, Ohio.

== Notable people ==
- Walter Dobrogosz (born 1933 in Albion), microbiologist
- David Lohr (born 1974), crime journalist for Discovery Communications, truTV and AOL
