= Cranesville, Pennsylvania =

Borough in Pennsylvania, US

- Borough
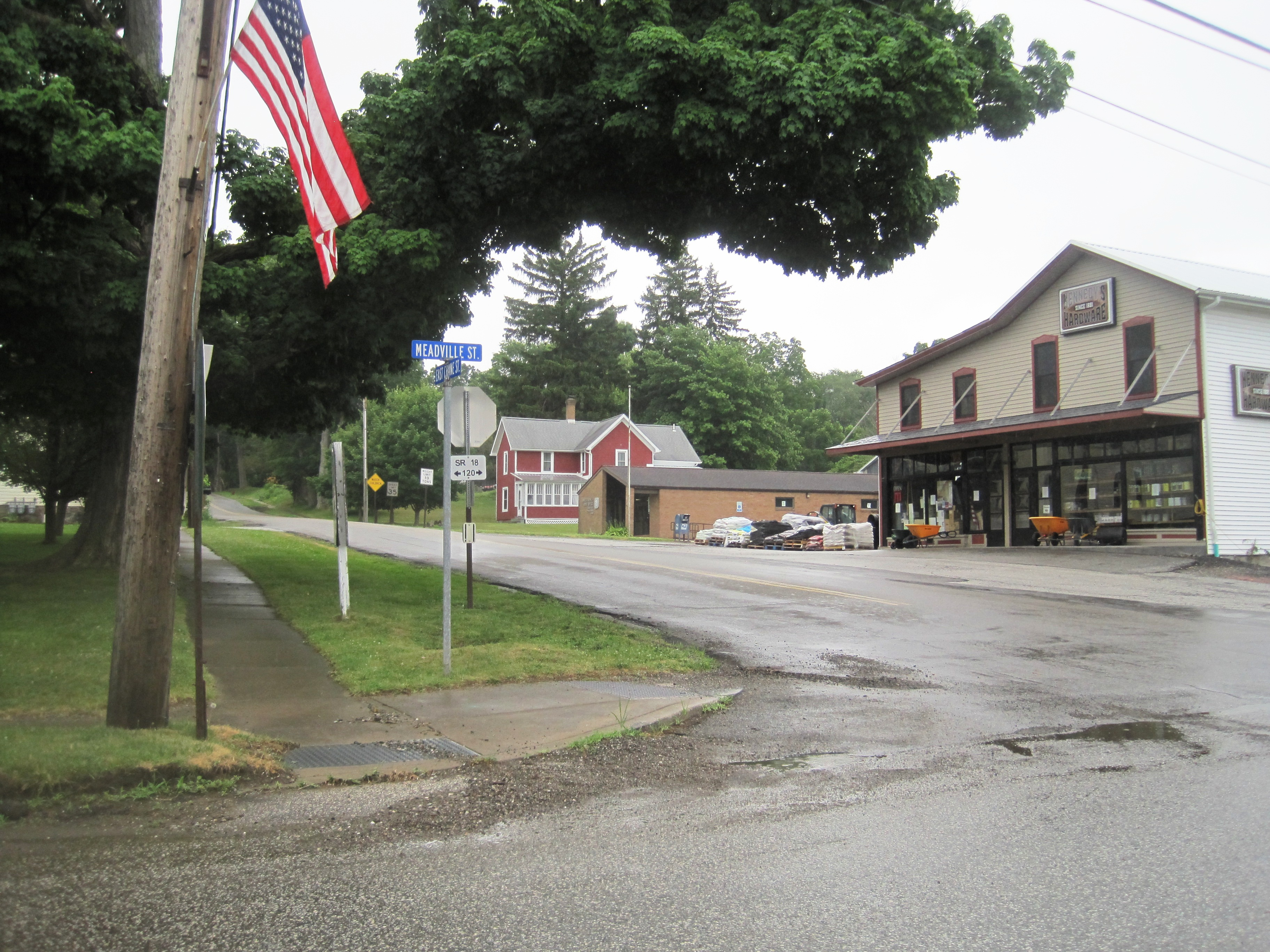
- Looking east along East Crane Street

- Location in Erie County and the U.S. state of Pennsylvania.
- Coordinates: 41°54′12″N 80°20′50″W
- Country: United States
- State: Pennsylvania
- County: Erie

Government
  - Mayor: Ashley Mills

Area
  - Total: 0.94 sq mi (2.43 km^{2})
  - Land: 0.93 sq mi (2.42 km^{2})
  - Water: 0.0039 sq mi (0.01 km^{2})
- Elevation: 945 ft (288 m)

Population (2020)
  - Total: 570
  - Density: 609.4/sq mi (235.29/km^{2})
- Time zone: UTC-4 (EST)
  - Summer (DST): UTC-5 (EDT)
- ZIP code: 16410
- Area code: 814
- FIPS code: 42-16960
- GNIS feature ID: 1172645

Cranesville is a borough in Erie County, Pennsylvania, United States. The population was 572 at the 2020 census. It is part of the Erie Metropolitan Statistical Area.

Cranesville is the birthplace of Olympic gold medalist John Williams.

== History ==
Cranesville was named after its founder, Fowler Crane. On May 31, 1985, the borough was devastated by a F4 tornado, which killed three people in Cranesville and another nine in nearby Albion.

== Geography ==
Cranesville is located in southwestern Erie County at 41°54′12″N 80°20′50″W (41.903313, -80.347089). It is bordered to the west by Conneaut Township and to the north, east, and south by Elk Creek Township. The borough of Albion is 2 miles (3 km) southwest of Cranesville.

According to the United States Census Bureau, the borough has a total area of 0.93 square miles (2.4 km^{2}), of which 0.004 square miles (0.01 km^{2}), or 0.51%, is water.

Pennsylvania Route 18 (Meadville Street) passes through the center of the borough, leading north 7 miles (11 km) to Girard and south 12 miles (19 km) to Conneautville. The city of Erie is 25 miles (40 km) northeast via PA 18, Interstate 90, and Interstate 79.

== Demographics ==
Historical population
Census	Pop.	Note	%±
1920	548		—
1930	554		1.1%
1940	548		−1.1%
1950	602		9.9%
1960	575		−4.5%
1970	705		22.6%
1980	703		−0.3%
1990	598		−14.9%
2000	600		0.3%
2010	638		6.3%
2020	570		−10.7%
2021 (est.)	567	▼	−0.5%

As of the census of 2000, there were 600 people, 216 households, and 166 families residing in the borough. The population density was 648.7 inhabitants per square mile (250.5/km^{2}). There were 221 housing units at an average density of 238.9 per square mile (92.2/km^{2}). The racial makeup of the borough was 99.17% White, 0.33% Asian, and 0.50% from two or more races.

There were 216 households, out of which 40.7% had children under the age of 18 living with them, 64.8% were married couples living together, 7.9% had a female householder with no husband present, and 22.7% were non-families. 18.5% of all households were made up of individuals, and 8.3% had someone living alone who was 65 years of age or older. The average household size was 2.78 and the average family size was 3.18.

In the borough the population was spread out, with 29.3% under the age of 18, 6.8% from 18 to 24, 32.3% from 25 to 44, 19.8% from 45 to 64, and 11.7% who were 65 years of age or older. The median age was 33 years. For every 100 females there were 103.4 males. For every 100 females age 18 and over, there were 99.1 males.

The median income for a household in the borough was $35,000, and the median income for a family was $37,500. Males had a median income of $28,068 versus $23,214 for females. The per capita income for the borough was $14,403. About 5.4% of families and 7.8% of the population were below the poverty line, including 8.8% of those under age 18 and none of those age 65 or over.

== Education ==
Cranesville is part of the Northwestern School District.
