= Steve Dobrogosz =

American composer, songwriter and pianist

- Born: January 26, 1956 (age 70); Bellefonte, Pennsylvania, U.S.
- Education: Berklee College of Music
- Occupations: Composer, songwriter and pianist
- Children: 3 sons, including Jonathan Fritzén
- Parent(s): Walter Dobrogosz and Donna Bartone

Steve Dobrogosz (born January 26, 1956 in Bellefonte, Pennsylvania) is an American composer, songwriter and pianist.

Dobrogosz is the son of Walter Dobrogosz and Donna Bartone and grew up in Raleigh, North Carolina, and attended Jesse O. Sanderson High School. He studied at the Berklee College of Music in Boston, Massachusetts, and afterwards moved in 1978 to Stockholm, Sweden, where he began recording and performing. Dobrogosz continues to reside in Stockholm.

Dobrogosz's more than 1700 compositions span several genres, including jazz, pop, and classical. He has written a number of popular choral compositions, including Mass (1992), which has been performed in more than 40 countries.

He has collaborated with singers such as Radka Toneff, Jeanette Lindström, Berit Andersson and Anna Christoffersson. His albums with Christoffersson, It's Always You and Rivertime, were nominated for the Grammis Award in the jazz album category. His 1982 album with Radka Toneff, Fairy Tales, was named best Norwegian album of all time in a 2012 Norwegian artist poll.

Dobrogosz is married to Swedish flutist Katarina Fritzén. They have three sons, including Jonathan Fritzén, a contemporary jazz pianist and multi-instrumentalist.

== Partial discography ==
- Songs (1980)
- Confessions (1981)
- Fairytales (1982), with Radka Toneff
- The Child's Gift (1986), with Steve Dobrogosz Vocal Ensemble
- Pianopieces (1994), solo, duets with Petur Östlund
- Duckwalk (1996)
- Mass and Chamber Music (1997), with St. Jacob's Chamber Choir
- Ebony Moon (1998)
- Best of Dobrogosz and Andersson (1999), with Berit Andersson
- Feathers (2000), with Jeanette Lindstrom
- Requiem/Te Deum (2004), with St. Jacob's Chamber Choir
- It's Always You (2006), with Anna Christoffersson
- When Lilacs Last in the Dooryard Bloom'd (2006), with St. Jacob's Chamber Choir
- Rivertime (2008), with Anna Christoffersson
- My Rose (2009), with Projectkoor Opus, Netherlands
- Stream (2009)
- Poems (2007), with Annika Skoglund
- Golden Slumbers (2009)
- Your Songs (2010)
- Covers (2010), with Anna Christoffersson
- World (2010)
- Celebratory Music (2010), with Andrew Canning, organ
- Charts (2011)
- Christmas Cantata (2012), Linköpings Akademiskakören
- The Water of Life (2013)
- Forest (2014)
- Dreams (2014)
- Free Country (2015)
- Bara (2015), with Chikako Hino
- The Wild Bird Flies (2016)
- Stabat Mater (2016), Hiroshima Chuo Choir, Nozomi Terasawa
- Silencer (2016)
- Anthology (2017), with Berit Andersson
- Sha-La (2017), Steve Dobrogosz Vocal Ensemble
- The Earth Is Singing (2018), with SYC Ensemble Singers, Jennifer Tham
- Rocking Chair (2019)
- Mood (2020)
- The Gospel Chord (2021)
- Yuletide (2022)
- Almost Live (2022), with Anna Christoffersson
- The Wild Bird Flies (2022) jazz collection
- Leaves in the Grass (2023)
- Parables (2024)
- Candlelight Candlelight Two (2024)
- Blues Conspiracy (2024)
- Relived (2024), covers
- Whirligig (2024)
- Ambient Land Scapes (2025)
- 17 Reels (2025), original Scottish reels
- Relived Again (2025), covers
- Lounge (2025), piano trio jazz
