= Walter Dobrogosz =

American microbiologist

- Born: September 3, 1933; Albion, Pennsylvania, U.S.
- Died: August 4, 2023 (aged 89); Raleigh, North Carolina, U.S.
- Education: Pennsylvania State University
- Spouse: Donna
- Children: Four, including Steve Dobrogosz
- Scientific career
- Fields: Bacteriology, biochemistry
- Workplaces: University of Illinois at Urbana-Champaign, North Carolina State University

Walter Dobrogosz (September 3, 1933 – August 4, 2023) was an American microbiologist who was professor emeritus of North Carolina State University, best known for his discovery and further research on the probiotic bacterium Lactobacillus reuteri.

== Early life and career ==
Dobrogosz was born in Albion, Pennsylvania on September 3, 1933. He grew up in Erie, Pennsylvania, and received his B.S., Masters, and Ph.D. degrees in bacteriology and biochemistry from Penn State University. In 1960–62, Dobrogosz held an NIH-supported postdoctoral fellowship at the University of Illinois at Urbana-Champaign, and afterwards began teaching at N.C. State University. He became a full Professor of Microbiology at N. C. State in 1968 and remained there until his retirement in 2003. While at N. C. State, he taught the graduate courses 'Metabolic Regulatory Mechanisms,' 'Microbial Physiology and Bioenergetics,' and 'Metabolism, Growth, and Regulation,' and the undergraduate courses "General Microbiology,' 'Microbial Metabolism,' and 'Microbes and World Affairs.'

Early in his research career, Dobrogosz studied metabolic regulation in such species as Escherichia coli and Salmonella typhimurium. In particular, his research focused on the phenomenon of catabolite repression, a regulatory system involving interactions of cyclic AMP, the catabolite repressor protein (CRP) complex, and the lac operon and other inducible systems in bacteria.

The focus of Dobrogosz's research shifted in 1985, when he and student Lars Axelsson identified L. reuteri, a new lactic acid bacterium. Later that year, while on a Fulbright Fellowship to study in Sweden, Dobrogosz and colleague Sven Lindgren discovered that L. reuteri produces a potent anti-microbial substance, which they termed "reuterin." Based on this, they hypothesized that the human-specific strain of L. reuteri had the potential to be a protective probiotic. Dobrogosz and his fellows obtained patents on both the bacterium and reuterin, and later began to market L. reuteri for its benefits to human and animal health.

Dobrogosz founded Probiologics International (PBI) in 1987, a company devoted to the commercial prospects of L. reuteri. PBI began to carry out human clinical trials, and found that L. reuteri is effective in preventing diarrheal diseases and other gut infections. L. reuteri is now known to maintain intestinal health, prevent fungal, bacterial, and protozoal infections, and mediate the body's immune response. PBI was purchased by public investors in 1990, and later its name was changed to BioGaia AB. It continues to market L. reuteri, often contained in yogurt or milk-based products, worldwide.

Dobrogosz was involved with the American Society for Microbiology (ASM) throughout his career. He served on the editorial board of the ASM journal, chaired the Genetics and Physiology section of the ASM, and presided for two terms over the ASM's North Carolina branch.

After retirement, Dobrogosz remained an active advocate of the "probiotic concept"; the importance of microbes in human health. He continued to publish review articles on L. reuteri, in addition to attending and lecturing at conferences on probiotic and microbiological research.

== Personal life and death ==
Though born in the United States, Dobrogosz was of Eastern European ancestry. His father was born in Warsaw, Poland (then under Russian control), and his mother was Slovac.

Dobrogosz married his wife Donna in 1953 and was the father of four children, including musician Steve Dobrogosz, and grandfather of nine. He later lived in Raleigh, North Carolina.

Dobrogosz was an avid athlete since his youth. In high school, he lettered in basketball, American football, and track and field. At Penn State University, he competed on the varsity track and field team as a hurdler. In his adulthood Dobrogosz discovered handball, at which he also became very competitive. One of the premier handball players in North Carolina during the 1970s, Dobrogosz won many tournaments, including the 1975 and 1977 North Carolina amateur men's singles championships, and the 1972, 1974, 1980, and 1981 Raleigh YMCA doubles titles.

Dobrogosz died in Raleigh on August 4, 2023, at the age of 89.

== Selected publications ==
Casas, Ivan A.; Dobrogosz, Walter J. (December 1, 2000). "Validation of the Probiotic Concept: Lactobacillus reuteri Confers Broad-spectrum Protection against Disease in Humans and Animals". Microbial Ecology in Health and Disease. 12 (4). doi:10.3402/mehd.v12i4.8196.

Edens FW, Parkhurst CR, Casas IA, Dobrogosz WJ (January 1997). "Principles of ex ovo competitive exclusion and in ovo administration of Lactobacillus reuteri". Poult. Sci. 76 (1): 179–96. doi:10.1093/ps/76.1.179. PMID 9037704.

Lindgren SE, Dobrogosz WJ (September 1990). "Antagonistic activities of lactic acid bacteria in food and feed fermentations". FEMS Microbiol. Rev. 7 (1–2): 149–63. doi:10.1111/j.1574-6968.1990.tb04885.x. PMID 2125429.

Talarico TL, Dobrogosz WJ (May 1989). "Chemical characterization of an antimicrobial substance produced by Lactobacillus reuteri". Antimicrob. Agents Chemother. 33 (5): 674–9. doi:10.1128/aac.33.5.674. PMC 172512. PMID 2751282.

Talarico TL, Casas IA, Chung TC, Dobrogosz WJ (December 1988). "Production and isolation of reuterin, a growth inhibitor produced by Lactobacillus reuteri". Antimicrob. Agents Chemother. 32 (12): 1854–8. doi:10.1128/aac.32.12.1854. PMC 176032. PMID 3245697.

Lee JH, Dobrogosz WJ (May 1983). "Effects of aerobic and anaerobic shock on catabolite repression in cyclic AMP suppressor mutants of Escherichia coli". J. Bacteriol. 154 (2): 992–4. doi:10.1128/jb.154.2.992-994.1983. PMC 217556. PMID 6302089.

== Sources ==
- http://microbiology.ncsu.edu/WJD/WJD.html
- http://www.biogaia.se/
