= David Lohr =

American crime journalist

David Lohr (born 1974) is an American journalist who has written about and interviewed many of the world's most notorious criminals.

Lohr gained national prominence in 2003 when Wichita, Kansas serial killer Dennis Rader (then known only as BTK), wrote letters to news outlets. One of his letters included a list of book chapters titled "The BTK Story" that were similar to a list of book chapters about BTK's crimes written by Lohr. This communication by Rader to the local media was but one of 11 similar communications made by him at the time, which led directly to Rader's February 2005 arrest, eventual confession, and conviction for the killing of 10 people between 1974 and 1991.

Previously, Lohr was senior investigative crime writer for the former CourtTV’s Crime Library and Discovery Channel, where he headed the Criminal Report at Investigation Discovery and reported on true crime cases in the news. Lohr currently is a senior crime reporter for The Huffington Post. He was instrumental in helping gain the freedom of Mac, a hip hop artist who Lohr alleges was wrongfully convicted of killing a fan in 2000.

Lohr lives in New Orleans, Louisiana.
