= Gudgeonville Covered Bridge =

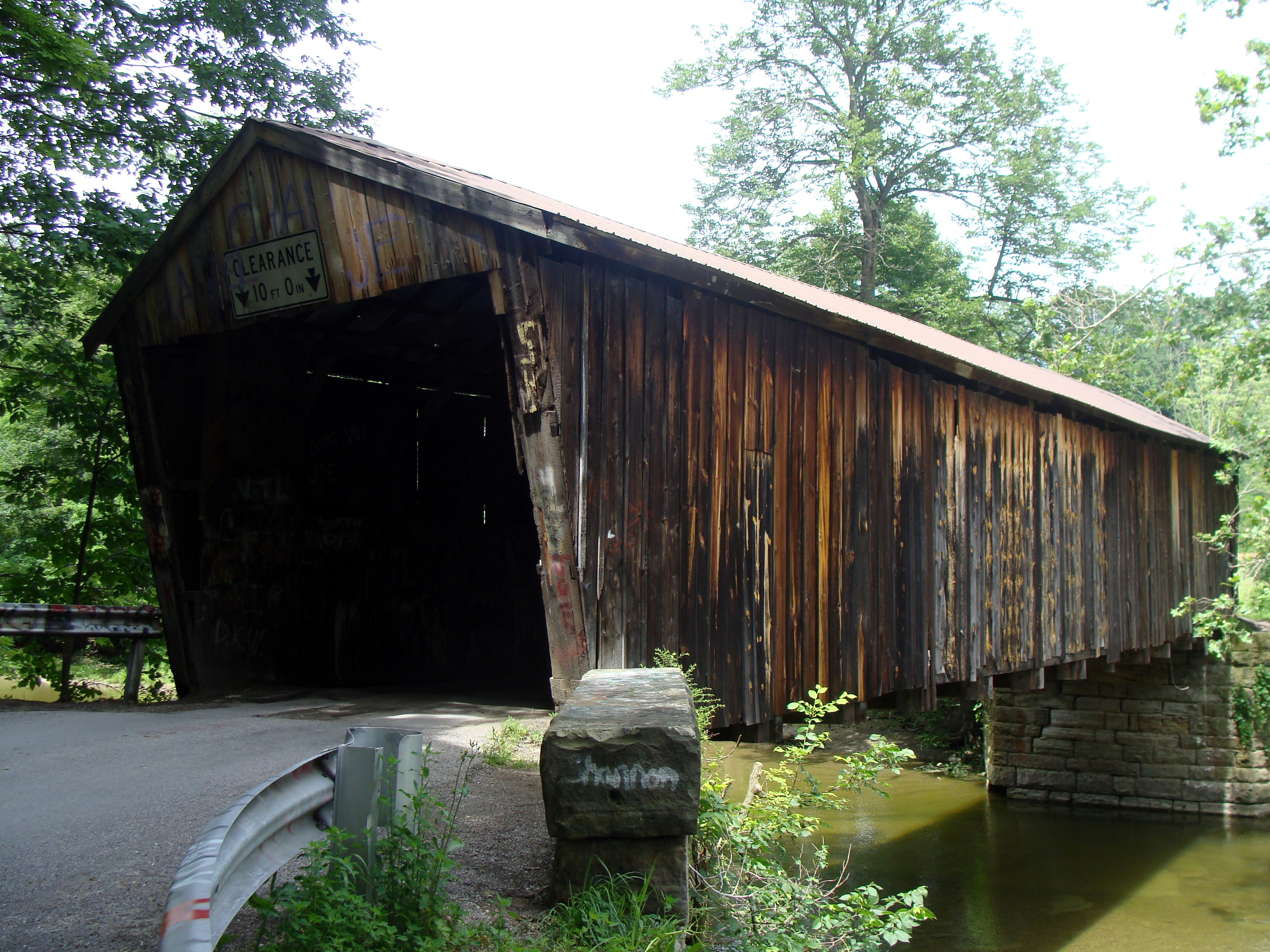
- The bridge before its destruction, July 2008
- Coordinates: 41°58′56″N 80°16′01″W
- Carried: Township 400
- Crossed: Elk Creek
- Locale: Erie, Pennsylvania, United States
- Official name: Gudgeonville Covered Bridge
- Other name: Gudgeonville Road
- Maintained by: Girard Township
- NBI Number: 257207040040080

Characteristics
- Total length: 84 ft (26 m)
- Width: 14 ft (4.3 m)
- Height: 10 ft (3.0 m)
- Load limit: 4.5 t (5.0 short tons)

History
- Constructed by: William Sherman
- Built: 1868
- Destroyed: November 8, 2008; 17 years ago
- Gudgeonville Covered Bridge
- U.S. National Register of Historic Places
- MPS: Covered Bridges of Erie County TR
- NRHP reference No.: 80003491
- Added to NRHP: September 17, 1980

Location
- Interactive map of Gudgeonville Covered Bridge

The Gudgeonville Covered Bridge was an 84-foot (25.6 m) long Multiple King-post Truss covered bridge over Elk Creek in Girard Township, Erie County in the U.S. state of Pennsylvania. It was built in 1868 and was listed on the National Register of Historic Places on September 17, 1980. It was destroyed by arson on November 8, 2008.

It was the oldest of the three remaining covered bridges in Erie County. The bridge structure's sufficiency rating on the Federal Highway Administration National Bridge Inventory was only 14.6 percent and its condition was deemed "basically intolerable requiring high priority of corrective action".

== History ==
=== Construction ===
The Gudgeonville Bridge was constructed around 1868 and was rebuilt in the early 1870s after a fire. The bridge was located in Girard Township and crossed Elk Creek. The bridge was built and designed by William Sherman. The foundation of the bridge is believed to be remnants of the Erie Extension Canal. The name of the bridge has been a mystery with some sources indicating that the bridge was constructed to provide access to a gudgeon factory.

=== Modern use and status ===
The bridge had been damaged from numerous small fires and has been the site of constant vandalism over the years. There were several proposals to dismantle the bridge and move it to a more secure location where it would not be vandalized. Another proposal was to build another bridge to bypass the original bridge, as it is too narrow to allow a variety of vehicles to cross it, including snowplows, fire trucks, and ambulances.

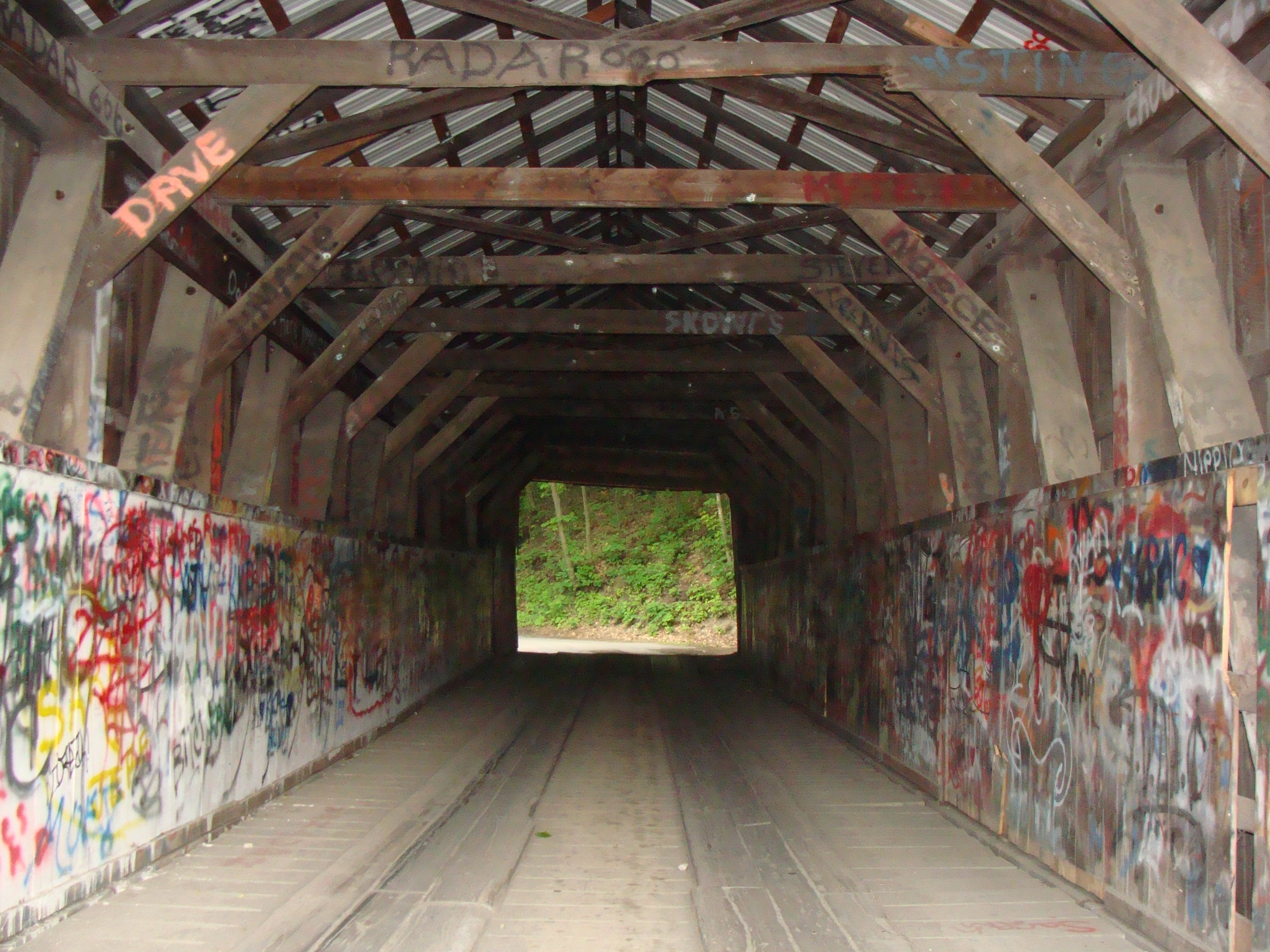
The interior of the Gudgeonville Covered Bridge, July 2008

Evans' 2001 Pennsylvania's Covered Bridges: A Complete Guide described the bridge to be "structurally sound," but its general appearance to be "most disappointing". The Federal Highway Administration National Bridge Inventory found the sufficiency rating^{[a]} of the bridge structure to be only 14.6 percent. It found that the bridge's foundations were determined to "scour critical," meaning that the bridge's foundations were "determined to be unstable for the calculated scour conditions," and that the railing "does not meet currently acceptable standards". Its overall condition was deemed "basically intolerable requiring high priority of corrective action", with an estimated cost to improve the bridge of $107,000 (equivalent to $171,000 in 2025).

=== Destruction ===
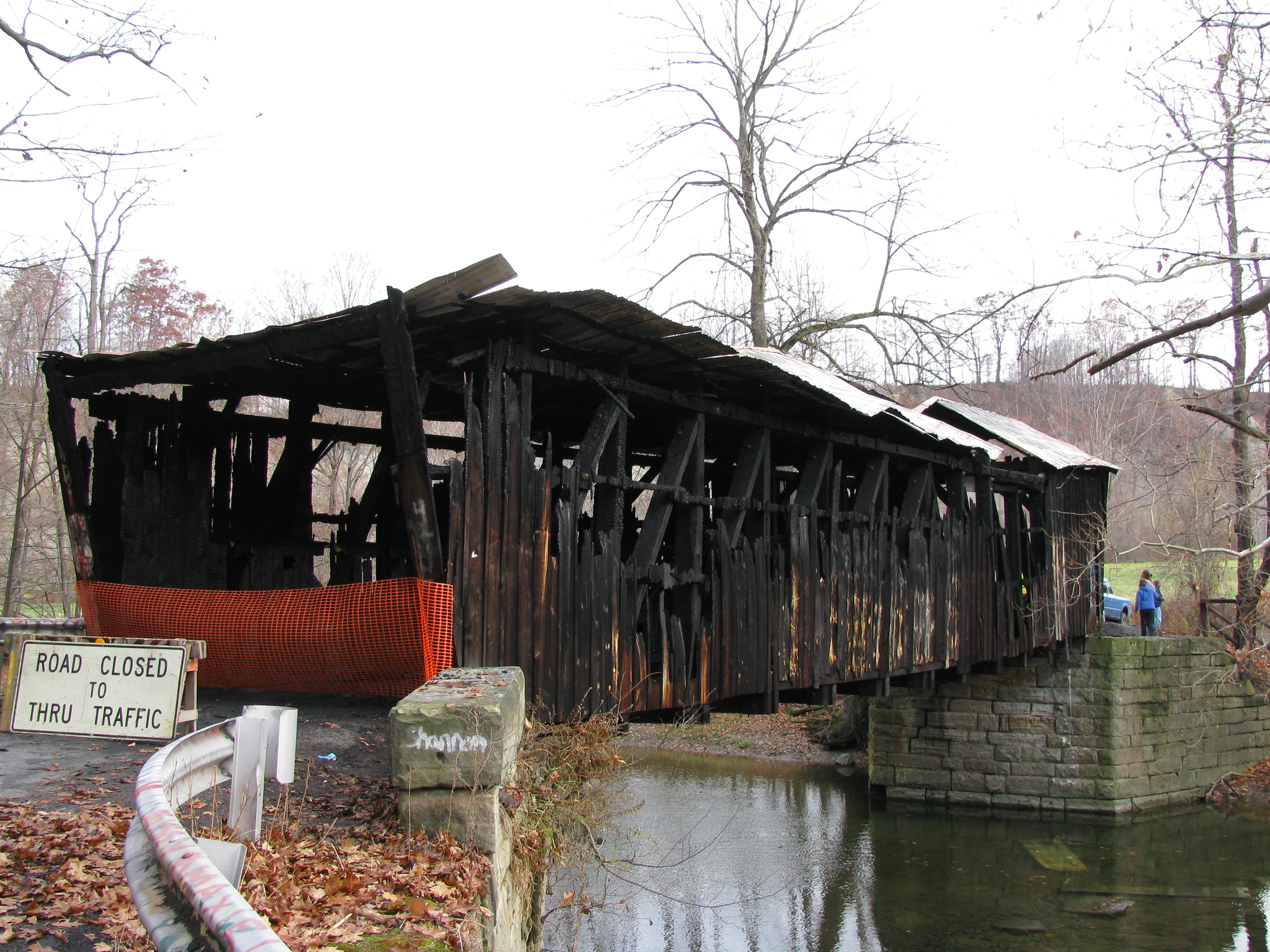
The Gudgeonville Covered Bridge after the fire on November 8, 2008

The Gudgeonville Covered Bridge caught fire around 1:40 am local time on November 8, 2008. The blaze was determined by the Pennsylvania State Police to have been an arson. On December 17, the State Police arrested two suspects after they confessed to dousing the bridge in gasoline and setting it on fire. The suspects were also involved in several other incidents in northern Crawford County and western Erie County. In August 2009, one of the arsonists was convicted and sentenced to 5 to 10 years in prison for the destruction of the bridge and for an unrelated charge. The other arsonist was sentenced to 5 1/2 to 14 years for the fire and for a string of other crimes.

=== Replacement bridge ===
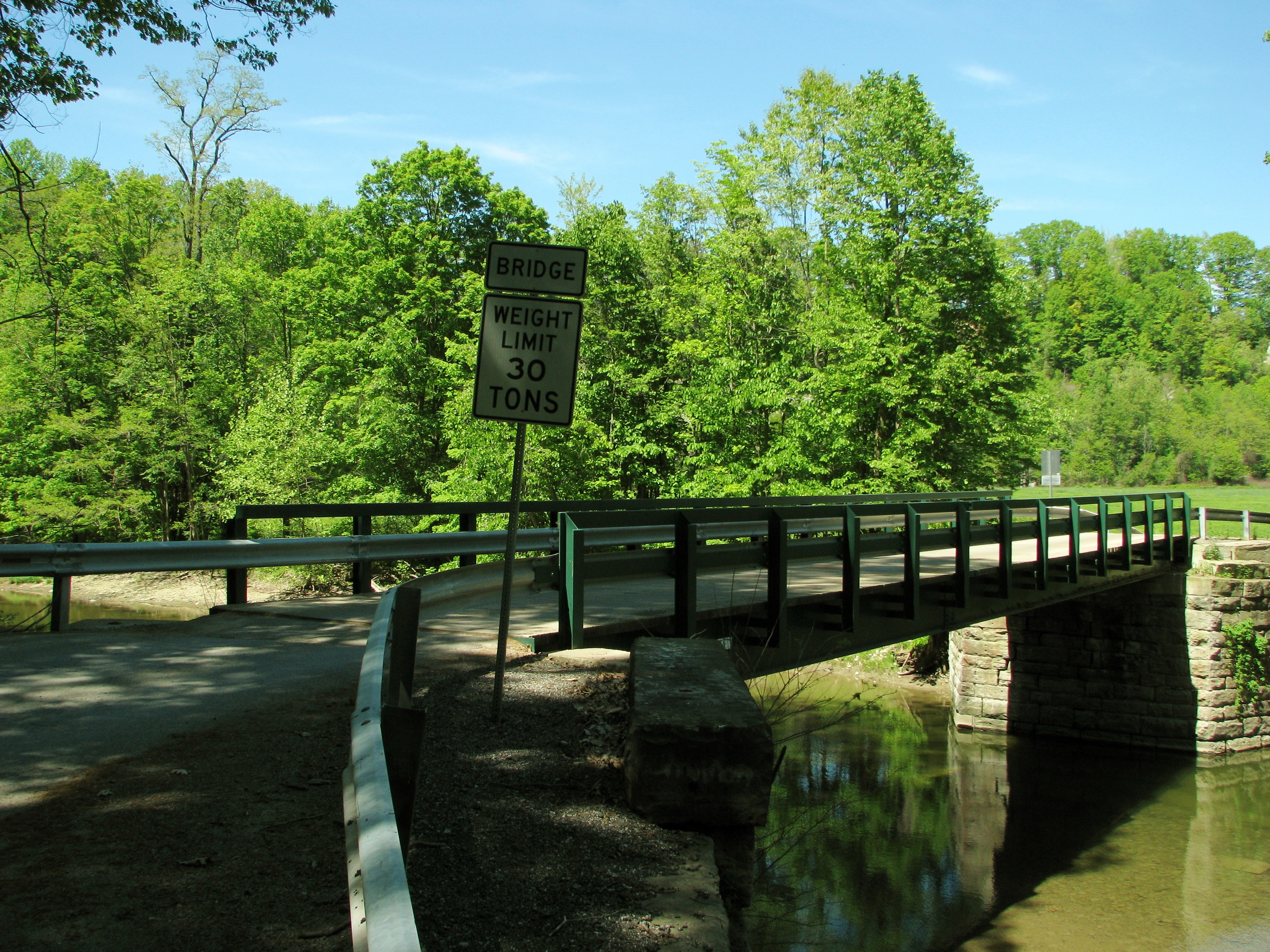
The replacement bridge in May 2015.

The remains of the bridge were lifted from its abutments and set in a nearby field and dismantled to allow for a temporary bridge to be built in its place on January 26. The Pennsylvania Department of Transportation (PennDOT) would not allow an exact replica of the covered bridge as it still would not be up to code. The temporary, prefabricated bridge was erected in August 2009, funded by an insurance policy held by the township. The new bridge was needed quickly as a permanent, concrete bridge would have taken three years to design and build. Without a bridge, traffic would have had to make a 2-mile (3 km) detour.

== Bridge dimensions ==
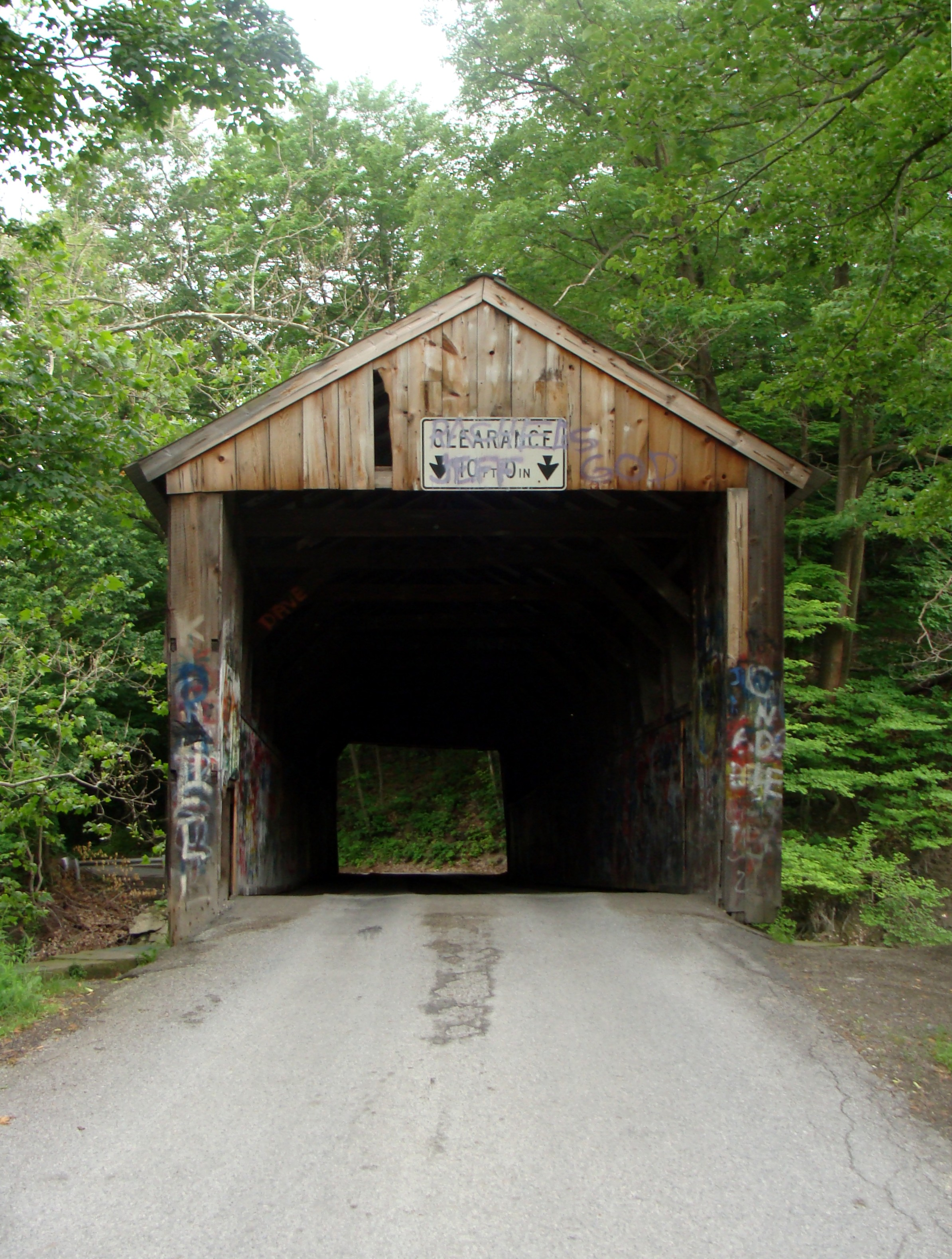
The north portal of the Gudgeonville Covered Bridge, July 2008

The following table is a comparison of published measurements of length, width and load recorded in different sources using different methods, as well as the name or names cited. NBI measures bridge length between the "backwalls of abutments" or pavement grooves and the roadway width as "the most restrictive minimum distance between curbs or rails". The NRHP form was prepared by the Pennsylvania Historical and Museum Commission (PHMC), which surveyed county engineers, historical and covered bridge societies, and others for all the covered bridges in the commonwealth. The Evans visited every covered bridge in Pennsylvania in 2001 and measured each bridge's length (portal to portal) and width (at the portal) for their book. The data in Zacher's book was based on a 1991 survey of all covered bridges in Pennsylvania by the PHMC and PennDOT, aided by local government and private agencies. The article uses primarily the NBI and NRHP data, as they are national programs.

Length feet (m)	Width feet (m)	Load short tons (MT)	Source (Year)
25.6 metres (84.0 ft)	4.3 metres (14.1 ft)	4.5 metric tons (5.0 short tons)	NBI (2007)
72 feet (21.9 m)*	11 feet (3.4 m)	3 short tons (2.7 t)	NRHP (1979)
85 feet 9 inches (26.1 m)	14 feet 1 inch (4.3 m)	NA	Evans (2001)
72 feet (21.9 m)*	14 feet (4.3 m)	NA	Zacher (1986)

* Listed mainspan length only

== See also ==
- List of bridges on the National Register of Historic Places in Pennsylvania

== Notes ==
a. The National Highway Administration established the sufficiency rating, which can vary from a low of 0 to a high of 100, as a way to prioritize federal funding for bridges. The rating is calculated based on "structural adequacy, whether the bridge is functionally obsolete, and level of service provided to the public". Federal funds are available for replacement of bridges with a rating of 50 or below, while those with a rating of 80 or below qualify for rehabilitation. In 2007, Pennsylvania had 22,291 bridges over 20 feet (6.1 m) long, of which 42.9 percent were either structurally deficient or functionally obsolete.
