= Elk Creek Township, Pennsylvania =

Township in Pennsylvania, US

Elk Creek
- Township
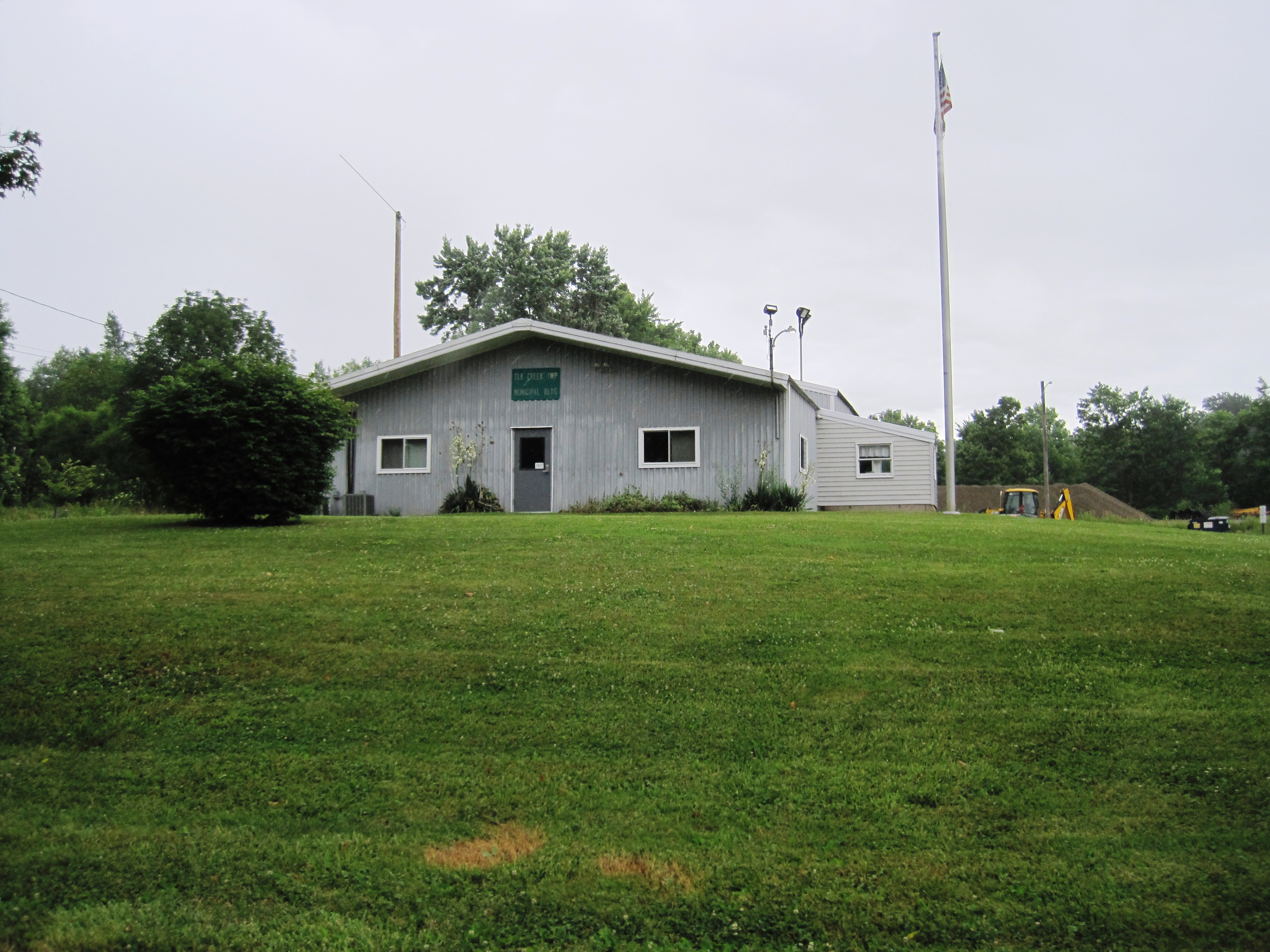
- Municipal building

- Logo

- Location in Erie County and the U.S. state of Pennsylvania
- Coordinates: 41°52′00″N 80°15′59″W
- Country: United States
- State: Pennsylvania
- County: Erie

Area
  - Total: 34.84 sq mi (90.24 km^{2})
  - Land: 34.74 sq mi (89.97 km^{2})
  - Water: 0.10 sq mi (0.27 km^{2})
- Highest elevation (southeast township boundary by Eureka Road): 1,370 ft (420 m)
- Lowest elevation (tributary to Crooked Creek): 850 ft (260 m)

Population (2020)
  - Total: 1,786 ▼
  - Estimate (2024): 1,818
  - Density: 50.7/sq mi (19.56/km^{2})
- Time zone: UTC-4 (EST)
  - Summer (DST): UTC-5 (EDT)
- Area code: 814
- FIPS code: 42-049-23088
- Website: elkcreektwp.org

Elk Creek Township is a township in Erie County, Pennsylvania, United States. The population was 1,786 at the 2020 census, down from 1,798 at the 2010 census.

== Geography ==
Elk Creek Township is in southern Erie County and is bordered to the south by Crawford County. The borough of Cranesville, a separate municipality, is on the western edge of the township.

According to the United States Census Bureau, the township has a total area of 34.8 square miles (90.2 km^{2}), of which 34.7 square miles (90.0 km^{2}) is land and 0.1 square miles (0.3 km^{2}), or 0.30%, is water.

== Demographics ==
Historical population
Census	Pop.	Note	%±
2000	1,800		—
2010	1,798		−0.1%
2020	1,786		−0.7%
2024 (est.)	1,818		1.8%
U.S. Decennial Census

As of the census of 2000, there were 1,800 people, 653 households, and 519 families residing in the township. The population density was 51.8 inhabitants per square mile (20.0/km^{2}). There were 700 housing units at an average density of 20.2/sq mi (7.8/km^{2}). The racial makeup of the township was 98.22% White, 0.28% African American, 0.22% Native American, 0.28% from other races, and 1.00% from two or more races. Hispanic or Latino of any race were 0.78% of the population.

There were 653 households, out of which 34.2% had children under the age of 18 living with them, 69.2% were married couples living together, 6.3% had a female householder with no husband present, and 20.5% were non-families. 16.4% of all households were made up of individuals, and 7.5% had someone living alone who was 65 years of age or older. The average household size was 2.76 and the average family size was 3.10.

In the township the population was spread out, with 25.8% under the age of 18, 7.6% from 18 to 24, 28.5% from 25 to 44, 26.0% from 45 to 64, and 12.1% who were 65 years of age or older. The median age was 39 years. For every 100 females, there were 101.6 males. For every 100 females age 18 and over, there were 100.1 males.

The median income for a household in the township was $42,269, and the median income for a family was $45,417. Males had a median income of $35,184 versus $25,132 for females. The per capita income for the township was $17,424. About 4.3% of families and 6.0% of the population were below the poverty line, including 4.4% of those under age 18 and 3.6% of those age 65 or over.
