= Conneaut Township, Erie County, Pennsylvania =

Township in Pennsylvania, US

Coordinates: 41°52′00″N 80°21′59″W

- Township
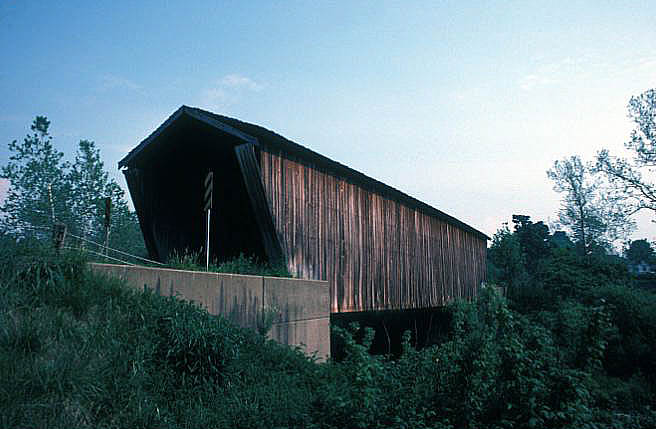
- Harrington Covered Bridge

- Location in Erie County and the U.S. state of Pennsylvania
- Country: United States
- State: Pennsylvania
- County: Erie

Area
  - Total: 43.43 sq mi (112.48 km^{2})
  - Land: 43.07 sq mi (111.56 km^{2})
  - Water: 0.36 sq mi (0.92 km^{2})
- Highest elevation (southeast corner of township): 1,120 ft (340 m)
- Lowest elevation (Conneaut Creek): 770 ft (230 m)

Population (2020)
  - Total: 4,187 ▼
  - Estimate (2024): 3,969
  - Density: 101.0/sq mi (38.99/km^{2})
- Time zone: UTC-4 (EST)
  - Summer (DST): UTC-5 (EDT)
- Area code: 814
- FIPS code: 42-049-15736

Conneaut Township is a township in Erie County, Pennsylvania, United States. The population was 4,187 at the 2020 census, down from 4,290 at the 2010 census, up from 3,908 in 2000.

== History ==
The Harrington Covered Bridge was listed on the National Register of Historic Places in 1980.

== Geography ==
Conneaut Township occupies the southwest corner of Erie County. It is bordered to the south by Crawford County and to the west by Ashtabula County in Ohio. The township surrounds the borough of Albion, a separate municipality.

According to the United States Census Bureau, the township has a total area of 43.4 square miles (112.5 km^{2}), of which 43.1 square miles (111.6 km^{2}) is land and 0.3 square miles (0.9 km^{2}), or 0.82%, is water. Conneaut Creek, a tributary of Lake Erie, crosses the east side of the township from south to north, then turns west and forms the northern border of the township until it enters Ohio.

== Demographics ==
Historical population
Census	Pop.	Note	%±
1980	1,893		—
1990	1,938		2.4%
2000	3,908		101.7%
2010	4,290		9.8%
2020	4,187		−2.4%
2024 (est.)	3,969		−5.2%
U.S. Decennial Census

As of the census of 2000, there were 3,908 people, 740 households, and 563 families residing in the township. The population density was 90.2 inhabitants per square mile (34.8/km^{2}). There were 771 housing units at an average density of 17.8/sq mi (6.9/km^{2}). The racial makeup of the township was 73.39% White, 25.28% African American, 0.46% Native American, 0.36% Asian, 0.05% from other races, and 0.46% from two or more races. Hispanic or Latino of any race were 5.17% of the population.

There were 740 households, out of which 34.5% had children under the age of 18 living with them, 62.6% were married couples living together, 8.4% had a female householder with no husband present, and 23.9% were non-families. 19.3% of all households were made up of individuals, and 7.7% had someone living alone who was 65 years of age or older. The average household size was 2.73 and the average family size was 3.08.

In the township the population was spread out, with 14.0% under the age of 18, 14.9% from 18 to 24, 46.7% from 25 to 44, 17.5% from 45 to 64, and 6.9% who were 65 years of age or older. The median age was 33 years. For every 100 females there were 295.9 males. For every 100 females age 18 and over, there were 361.7 males.

The median income for a household in the township was $35,682, and the median income for a family was $38,421. Males had a median income of $32,391 versus $21,957 for females. The per capita income for the township was $7,971. About 8.5% of families and 11.1% of the population were below the poverty line, including 15.8% of those under age 18 and 8.0% of those age 65 or over.
