= 2004 Pennsylvania House of Representatives election =

- November 2, 2004

All 203 seats in the Pennsylvania House of Representatives 102 seats needed for a majority
	Majority party	Minority party
Leader	John Perzel	Bill DeWeese
Party	Republican	Democratic
Leader since	March 29, 2003	January 3, 1995
Leader's seat	172nd	50th
Last election	110	93
Seats before	109	94
Seats after	110	93
Seat change	▲1	▼1
- Results: Republican hold Republican gain Democratic hold Democratic gain
Speaker before election
John Perzel
Republican
Elected Speaker
John Perzel
Republican

The 2004 Elections for the Pennsylvania House of Representatives were held on November 2, 2004, with all districts being contested. Necessary primary elections were held on April 27, 2004. Necessary primary elections were held on May 21, 2002. The term of office for those elected in 2004 ran from January 4, 2005 through November 2006. State Representatives are elected for two-year terms, with the entire House of Representatives up for a vote every two years.

== Predictions ==
Source	Ranking	As of
Rothenberg	Likely R	October 1, 2004

== Overview ==
Affiliation	Seats at Last Election	Seats at End of Legislative Session	Seats after Election	Change Since Last Election
Democratic	93	94	93	+/-0
Republican	110	109	110	+/-0

=== Special elections ===
A special election for the 99th legislative district was held on March 18, 2003, following the December 2002 death of Leroy M. Zimmerman. Republican Gordon Denlinger easily defeated Democrat Bernadette C. Johnson to keep the seat in Republican hands.

A special election for the 168th legislative district was held on June 17, 2003, following the March 2003 death of Matthew J. Ryan. Republican Tom Killion easily defeated Democrat William A. Thomas to keep the seat in Republican hands.

A special election for the 44th legislative district was held on June 17, 2003, following the election of John Pippy to the Pennsylvania Senate. Republican Mark Mustio defeated Democrat Frederich Liechti to keep the seat in Republican hands.

A special election for the 3rd legislative district was held on July 22, 2003, following the May 2003 death of Karl Boyes. Republican Matthew W. Good easily defeated Democrat Brian C. McGrath to take the seat.

A special election for the 109th legislative district was held on January 27, 2004, following the election of John Gordner to the Pennsylvania Senate. Republican David R. Millard defeated Democrat Paul Reichart to keep the seat in Republican hands.

A special election for the 152nd legislative district was held on March 9, 2004, following the January 2004 death of Roy Cornell. Republican Susan Cornell easily defeated Democrat Ross Schriftmann to keep the seat in Republican hands.

=== Primary election ===
In the primary election held on April 27, 2004, only one incumbent legislator was defeated for their party's nomination. In the 190th legislative district Democrat Michael Horsey was defeated by Thomas W. Blackwell.

=== Retirements ===
Five seats left open by Republican retirements were kept by Republicans, with Jeff Pyle succeeding Jeff Coleman, Kathy Rapp succeeding Jim Lynch, Mark Keller succeeding Allan Egolf, Tom Quigley succeeding Mary Ann Dailey, and Glen Grell succeeding Pat Vance. Democrat Susan Laughlin was succeeded by fellow Democrat Sean M. Ramaley.

The seat vacated by the retirement of Democrat Guy Travaglio was won by Republican Brian L. Ellis. The seat occupied by Jeffrey Coy was filled by Republican Rob Kauffman. Republican Ellen Bard's seat was taken by Democrat Josh Shapiro when she left her seat to run for Congress.

=== 4th legislative district ===
In the 4th legislative district, incumbent Democrat Tom Scrimenti was defeated by Republican Curt Sonney.

=== 148th legislative district ===
In the 148th legislative district, incumbent Republican Melissa Murphy Weber was defeated by Democrat Mike Gerber.

== General election ==
District	Party	Incumbent	Status	Party	Candidate	Votes	%
1	Democratic	Linda Bebko-Jones	re-elected	Democratic	Linda Bebko-Jones	16,008	100
2	Democratic	Florindo J. Fabrizio	re-elected	Democratic	Florindo J. Fabrizio	18,008	100
3	Republican	Matthew W. Good	re-elected	Republican	Matthew W. Good	29,666	100
4	Democratic	Tom Scrimenti	defeated	Republican	Curt Sonney	13,148	50.3
4	Democratic	Tom Scrimenti	defeated	Democratic	Tom Scrimenti	12,968	49.7
5	Republican	John R. Evans	re-elected	Republican	John R. Evans	17,446	71.3
5	Republican	John R. Evans	re-elected	Democratic	Jason White	7,019	28.7
6	Republican	Teresa Forcier	re-elected	Republican	Teresa Forcier	14,878	63.6
6	Republican	Teresa Forcier	re-elected	Democratic	Keith Abbott	8,522	36.4
7	Democratic	Michael C. Gruitza	re-elected	Democratic	Michael C. Gruitza	20,360	100
8	Republican	Dick Stevenson	re-elected	Republican	Dick Stevenson	22,784	100
9	Democratic	Chris Sainato	re-elected	Democratic	Chris Sainato	25,029	100
10	Democratic	Frank LaGrotta	re-elected	Democratic	Frank LaGrotta	19,137	100
11	Democratic	Guy A. Travaglio	retired	Republican	Brian L. Ellis	15,376	55.9
11	Democratic	Guy A. Travaglio	retired	Democratic	Fred M. Vero	10,926	39.7
11	Democratic	Guy A. Travaglio	retired	Constitution	Mike Rock	1,188	4.3
12	Republican	Daryl Metcalfe	re-elected	Republican	Daryl Metcalfe	27,191	100
13	Republican	Arthur D. Hershey	re-elected	Republican	Arthur D. Hershey	16,958	58.7
13	Republican	Arthur D. Hershey	re-elected	Democratic	Nancy L. Cox	11,950	41.3
14	Democratic	Mike Veon	re-elected	Democratic	Mike Veon	19,944	100
15	Democratic	Vince Biancucci	re-elected	Democratic	Vince Biancucci	21,601	100
16	Democratic	Susan Laughlin	retired	Democratic	Sean M. Ramaley	17,498	59.9
16	Democratic	Susan Laughlin	retired	Republican	Pat Geho	11,721	40.1
17	Republican	Rod E. Wilt	re-elected	Republican	Rod E. Wilt	19,002	100
18	Republican	Gene D. Digirolamo	re-elected	Republican	Gene Digirolamo	16,688	62
18	Republican	Gene D. Digirolamo	re-elected	Democratic	Victor Corsino	10,249	38
19	Democratic	Jake Wheatley	re-elected	Democratic	Jake Wheatley	18,253	100
20	Democratic	Don Walko	re-elected	Democratic	Don Walko	20,131	100
21	Democratic	Frank J. Pistella	re-elected	Democratic	Frank J. Pistella	19,471	93.1
21	Democratic	Frank J. Pistella	re-elected	Green	Jonah McAllister-Erickson	1,449	6.9
22	Democratic	Michael Diven	re-elected	Democratic	Michael Diven	21,481	100
23	Democratic	Dan B. Frankel	re-elected	Democratic	Dan B. Frankel	24,292	100
24	Democratic	Joseph Preston	re-elected	Democratic	Joseph Preston	23,042	100
25	Democratic	Joseph F. Markosek	re-elected	Democratic	Joseph F. Markosek	20,636	68.7
25	Democratic	Joseph F. Markosek	re-elected	Republican	Ed Nicholson	9,396	31.3
26	Republican	Tim Hennessey	re-elected	Republican	Tim Hennessey	19,899	100
27	Democratic	Thomas C. Petrone	re-elected	Democratic	Thomas C. Petrone	20,033	100
28	Republican	Mike Turzai	re-elected	Republican	Mike Turzai	25,488	73.2
28	Republican	Mike Turzai	re-elected	Democratic	Bradley Cline	9,317	26.8
29	Republican	Bernie O'Neill	re-elected	Republican	Bernie O'Neill	20,563	61.5
29	Republican	Bernie O'Neill	re-elected	Democratic	Brad Kirsch	12,871	38.5
30	Republican	Jeffrey E. Habay	re-elected	Republican	Jeffrey E. Habay	29,311	100
31	Republican	David J. Steil	re-elected	Republican	David J. Steil	19,684	57
31	Republican	David J. Steil	re-elected	Democratic	Judith S. Gordon	14,853	43
32	Democratic	Anthony M. De Luca	re-elected	Democratic	Anthony M. Deluca	22,506	100
33	Democratic	Frank Dermody	re-elected	Democratic	Frank Dermody	18,081	100
34	Democratic	Paul Costa	re-elected	Democratic	Paul Costa	22,530	100
35	Democratic	Marc J. Gergely	re-elected	Democratic	Marc J. Gergely	18,489	92.2
35	Democratic	Marc J. Gergely	re-elected	Libertarian	David Posipanka	1,574	7.8
36	Democratic	Harry Readshaw	re-elected	Democratic	Harry Readshaw	21,509	100
37	Republican	Thomas C. Creighton	re-elected	Republican	Thomas Creighton	21,498	100
38	Democratic	Kenneth W. Ruffing	re-elected	Democratic	Kenneth W. Ruffing	20,230	100
39	Democratic	David Levdansky	re-elected	Democratic	David K. Levdansky	17,597	61.7
39	Democratic	David Levdansky	re-elected	Republican	Brad Grantz	10,911	38.3
40	Republican	John A. Maher	re-elected	Republican	John A. Maher	25,027	100
41	Republican	Katie True	re-elected	Republican	Katie True	21,481	64.8
41	Republican	Katie True	re-elected	Democratic	Cheryl T. Desmond	11,683	35.2
42	Republican	Thomas L. Stevenson	re-elected	Republican	Thomas L. Stevenson	22,847	100
43	Republican	Scott W. Boyd	re-elected	Republican	Scott W. Boyd	20,943	75
43	Republican	Scott W. Boyd	re-elected	Democratic	Ben Donahower	6,978	25
44	Republican	Mark Mustio	re-elected	Republican	Mark Mustio	18,766	58.5
44	Republican	Mark Mustio	re-elected	Democratic	Tim McLaughlin	13,309	41.5
45	Democratic	Nick Kotik	re-elected	Democratic	Nick Kotik	19,982	100
46	Democratic	Victor John Lescovitz	re-elected	Democratic	Victor John Lescovitz	15,245	52.9
46	Democratic	Victor John Lescovitz	re-elected	Republican	Paul Snatchko	13,569	47.1
47	Republican	Keith Gillespie	re-elected	Republican	Keith Gillespie	20,923	100
48	Democratic	Timothy J. Solobay	re-elected	Democratic	Timothy J. Solobay	19,334	68.6
48	Democratic	Timothy J. Solobay	re-elected	Republican	Rick Yochum	8,618	30.6
48	Democratic	Timothy J. Solobay	re-elected	Reform	Demo Agoris	226	0.8
49	Democratic	Peter J. Daley	re-elected	Democratic	Peter J. Daley	17,366	69.3
49	Democratic	Peter J. Daley	re-elected	Republican	Jeffrey J. Baker	7,680	30.7
50	Democratic	Bill DeWeese	re-elected	Democratic	Bill DeWeese	17,799	100
51	Democratic	Larry Roberts	re-elected	Democratic	Larry Roberts	7,742	35.5
51	Democratic	Larry Roberts	re-elected	Independent	Timothy S. Mahoney	5,918	27.1
51	Democratic	Larry Roberts	re-elected	Independent	Gary Gearing	3,826	17.5
51	Democratic	Larry Roberts	re-elected	Republican	Harry Albert	3,732	17.1
51	Democratic	Larry Roberts	re-elected	Independent	Terry Janosek	613	2.8
52	Democratic	James E. Shaner	re-elected	Democratic	James E. Shaner	14,100	66.1
52	Democratic	James E. Shaner	re-elected	Republican	William R. Earnesty	7,232	33.9
53	Republican	Robert W. Godshall	re-elected	Republican	Robert W. Godshall	18,157	100
54	Democratic	John E. Pallone	re-elected	Democratic	John E. Pallone	17,116	60.2
54	Democratic	John E. Pallone	re-elected	Republican	Scott Witon	11,320	39.8
55	Democratic	Joseph A. Petrarca	re-elected	Democratic	Joseph A. Petrarca	17,759	70
55	Democratic	Joseph A. Petrarca	re-elected	Republican	Ben Kissel	7,608	30
56	Democratic	James E. Casorio	re-elected	Democratic	James E. Casorio	18,821	63.1
56	Democratic	James E. Casorio	re-elected	Republican	Scott E. Avolio	11,026	36.9
57	Democratic	Thomas A. Tangretti	re-elected	Democratic	Thomas A. Tangretti	16,559	59.8
57	Democratic	Thomas A. Tangretti	re-elected	Republican	P. Scott Conner	11,132	40.2
58	Democratic	R. Ted Harhai	re-elected	Democratic	R. Ted Harhai	18,900	100
59	Republican	Jess Stairs	re-elected	Republican	Jess Stairs	27,755	100
60	Republican	Jeff Coleman	retired	Republican	Jeff Pyle	14,146	61.6
60	Republican	Jeff Coleman	retired	Democratic	Barry W. Crytzer	8,808	38.4
61	Republican	Kate M. Harper	re-elected	Republican	Kate M. Harper	19,511	59.5
61	Republican	Kate M. Harper	re-elected	Democratic	Doug Ross	13,303	40.5
62	Republican	Dave Reed	re-elected	Republican	Dave Reed	14,231	56.8
62	Republican	Dave Reed	re-elected	Democratic	Owen Dougherty	10,809	43.2
63	Republican	Fred McIlhattan	re-elected	Republican	Fred McIlhattan	20,865	92.8
63	Republican	Fred McIlhattan	re-elected	Libertarian	Michael J. Robertson	1,622	7.2
64	Republican	Scott E. Hutchinson	re-elected	Republican	Scott E. Hutchinson	20,936	100
65	Republican	Jim Lynch	retired	Republican	Kathy Rapp	15,556	63.3
65	Republican	Jim Lynch	retired	Democratic	Steven A. Sigmund	9,026	36.7
66	Republican	Sam Smith	re-elected	Republican	Sam Smith	20,407	100
67	Republican	Martin T. Causer	re-elected	Republican	Martin T. Causer	18,149	100
68	Republican	Matthew E. Baker	re-elected	Republican	Matthew E. Baker	23,925	100
69	Republican	Bob Bastian	re-elected	Republican	Bob Bastian	18,467	70.3
69	Republican	Bob Bastian	re-elected	Democratic	Charles E. Stuby	7,813	29.7
70	Republican	John W. Fichter	re-elected	Republican	John W. Fichter	15,929	55
70	Republican	John W. Fichter	re-elected	Democratic	Matthew Gordon	13,025	45
71	Democratic	Edward P. Wojnaroski	re-elected	Democratic	Edward P. Wojnaroski	18,904	73.1
71	Democratic	Edward P. Wojnaroski	re-elected	Republican	Susan Holmes	6,949	26.9
72	Democratic	Tom Yewcic	re-elected	Democratic	Tom Yewcic	21,893	76.5
72	Democratic	Tom Yewcic	re-elected	Republican	Daniel Branas	6,712	23.5
73	Democratic	Gary Haluska	re-elected	Democratic	Gary Haluska	21,128	100
74	Democratic	Camille George	re-elected	Democratic	Camille George	17,348	73
74	Democratic	Camille George	re-elected	Republican	C. J. Spencer	6,415	27
75	Democratic	Dan A. Surra	re-elected	Democratic	Dan A. Surra	20,789	100
76	Democratic	Mike Hanna	re-elected	Democratic	Mike Hanna	15,168	68.2
76	Democratic	Mike Hanna	re-elected	Republican	John T. Krupa	7,087	31.8
77	Republican	Lynn Herman	re-elected	Republican	Lynn Herman	17,006	57.7
77	Republican	Lynn Herman	re-elected	Democratic	Jon Eich	11,884	40.3
77	Republican	Lynn Herman	re-elected	Libertarian	Thomas A. Martin	598	2
78	Republican	Dick L. Hess	re-elected	Republican	Dick L. Hess	29,647	100
79	Republican	Richard A. Geist	re-elected	Republican	Richard A. Geist	16,495	68.9
79	Republican	Richard A. Geist	re-elected	Democratic	David E. Francis	7,433	31.1
80	Republican	Jerry A. Stern	re-elected	Republican	Jerry A. Stern	26,487	100
81	Republican	Larry O. Sather	re-elected	Republican	Larry O. Sather	19,089	100
82	Republican	C. Adam Harris	re-elected	Republican	C. Adam Harris	23,472	100
83	Republican	Steven W. Cappelli	re-elected	Republican	Steven W. Cappelli	18,063	100
84	Republican	Brett Feese	re-elected	Republican	Brett Feese	20,035	100
85	Republican	Russ Fairchild	re-elected	Republican	Russ Fairchild	19,386	100
86	Republican	Allan Egolf	retired	Republican	Mark K. Keller	21,650	100
87	Republican	Patricia H. Vance	ran for Pennsylvania Senate	Republican	Glen R. Grell	20,276	60.6
87	Republican	Patricia H. Vance	ran for Pennsylvania Senate	Democratic	Marilyn C. Zilli	13,194	39.4
88	Republican	Jerry L. Nailor	re-elected	Republican	Jerry L. Nailor	22,330	72.5
88	Republican	Jerry L. Nailor	re-elected	Democratic	Margaret M. Stuski	8,459	27.5
89	Democratic	Jeffrey W. Coy	retired	Republican	Rob Kauffman	16,043	60.3
89	Democratic	Jeffrey W. Coy	retired	Democratic	Doug Harbach	10,545	39.7
90	Republican	Patrick E. Fleagle	re-elected	Republican	Patrick E. Fleagle	24,449	100
91	Republican	Stephen R. Maitland	re-elected	Republican	Stephen R. Maitland	19,945	73.8
91	Republican	Stephen R. Maitland	re-elected	Democratic	Alan Henry	7,092	26.2
92	Republican	Bruce I. Smith	re-elected	Republican	Bruce I. Smith	22,057	75.3
92	Republican	Bruce I. Smith	re-elected	Democratic	Matt Kelly	7,225	24.7
93	Republican	Ron Miller	re-elected	Republican	Ron Miller	22,078	92.6
93	Republican	Ron Miller	re-elected	Green	Susan L. Savia	1,758	7.4
94	Republican	Stanley E. Saylor	re-elected	Republican	Stanley E. Saylor	20,970	100
95	Democratic	Stephen H. Stetler	re-elected	Democratic	Stephen H. Stetler	12,632	100
96	Democratic	Mike Sturla	re-elected	Democratic	Mike Sturla	13,808	65.7
96	Democratic	Mike Sturla	re-elected	Republican	Tony Allen	7,195	34.3
97	Republican	Roy E. Baldwin	re-elected	Republican	Roy E. Baldwin	24,089	94.7
97	Republican	Roy E. Baldwin	re-elected	Green	Vern Marten	1,356	5.3
98	Republican	David S. Hickernell	re-elected	Republican	David S. Hickernell	19,566	100
99	Republican	Gordon R. Denlinger	re-elected	Republican	Gordon R. Denlinger	18,757	100
100	Republican	Gibson C. Armstrong	re-elected	Republican	Gibson C. Armstrong	18,426	100
101	Republican	Mauree Gingrich	re-elected	Republican	Mauree A. Gingrich	16,412	83.5
101	Republican	Mauree Gingrich	re-elected	Libertarian	Russ Diamond	3,248	16.5
102	Republican	Peter J. Zug	re-elected	Republican	Peter J. Zug	19,959	93.1
102	Republican	Peter J. Zug	re-elected	Libertarian	Raymond S. Ondrusek	1,482	6.9
103	Democratic	Ron Buxton	re-elected	Democratic	Ron Buxton	19,611	100
104	Republican	Mark S. McNaughton	re-elected	Republican	Mark S. McNaughton	22,312	100
105	Republican	Ron Marsico	re-elected	Republican	Ron Marsico	26,058	86.7
105	Republican	Ron Marsico	re-elected	Libertarian	Cheryl L. Gordon	4,001	13.3
106	Republican	John D. Payne	re-elected	Republican	John D. Payne	17,131	59.7
106	Republican	John D. Payne	re-elected	Democratic	Dan Holt	11,572	40.3
107	Democratic	Robert Belfanti	re-elected	Democratic	Robert E. Belfanti	14,099	60.9
107	Democratic	Robert Belfanti	re-elected	Republican	John B. Bulger	9,069	39.1
108	Republican	Merle H. Phillips	re-elected	Republican	Merle H. Phillips	20,069	100
109	Republican	David R. Millard	re-elected	Republican	David R. Millard	14,241	57.7
109	Republican	David R. Millard	re-elected	Democratic	Paul E. Reichart	10,448	42.3
110	Republican	Tina Pickett	re-elected	Republican	Tina Pickett	21,418	100
111	Republican	Sandra J. Major	re-elected	Republican	Sandra J. Major	21,619	90.1
111	Republican	Sandra J. Major	re-elected	Green	Jay Sweeney	2,379	9.9
112	Democratic	Fred Belardi	re-elected	Democratic	Fred Belardi	17,745	100
113	Democratic	Gaynor Cawley	re-elected	Democratic	Gaynor Cawley	19,434	100
114	Democratic	Jim Wansacz	re-elected	Democratic	Jim Wansacz	20,711	71
114	Democratic	Jim Wansacz	re-elected	Republican	Frank Scavo	8,459	29
115	Democratic	Edward Staback	re-elected	Democratic	Edward G. Staback	19,623	100
116	Democratic	Todd A. Eachus	re-elected	Democratic	Todd A. Eachus	15,480	68.6
116	Democratic	Todd A. Eachus	re-elected	Republican	Sean P. Shamany	7,016	31.1
116	Democratic	Todd A. Eachus	re-elected	Socialist	Kristofer N. Barkanic	66	0.3
117	Republican	George C. Hasay	re-elected	Republican	George C. Hasay	16,795	67.7
117	Republican	George C. Hasay	re-elected	Democratic	Nathan Sorber	8,020	32.3
118	Democratic	Thomas M. Tigue	re-elected	Democratic	Thomas M. Tigue	14,900	58.4
118	Democratic	Thomas M. Tigue	re-elected	Republican	Donna M. Asure	10,622	41.6
119	Democratic	John T. Yudichak	re-elected	Democratic	John T. Yudichak	16,686	100
120	Democratic	Phyllis Mundy	re-elected	Democratic	Phyllis Mundy	17,799	100
121	Democratic	Kevin Blaum	re-elected	Democratic	Kevin Blaum	13,477	62.6
121	Democratic	Kevin Blaum	re-elected	Republican	Christine Katsock	8,035	37.4
122	Democratic	Keith McCall	re-elected	Democratic	Keith R. McCall	16,847	100
123	Democratic	Neal Goodman	re-elected	Democratic	Neal P. Goodman	17,856	73.4
123	Democratic	Neal Goodman	re-elected	Republican	Tom Yarnell	6,466	26.6
124	Republican	David G. Argall	re-elected	Republican	David G. Argall	20,111	71.2
124	Republican	David G. Argall	re-elected	Democratic	Christian P. Morrison	8,145	28.8
125	Republican	Bob Allen	re-elected	Republican	Bob Allen	22,704	100
126	Democratic	Dante Santoni	re-elected	Democratic	Dante Santoni	19,650	93.5
126	Democratic	Dante Santoni	re-elected	Green	Scott R. Bussler	1,371	6.5
127	Democratic	Thomas R. Caltagirone	re-elected	Democratic	Thomas R. Caltagirone	13,341	91.2
127	Democratic	Thomas R. Caltagirone	re-elected	Green	Stefan C. Kosikowski	1,292	8.8
128	Republican	Samuel E. Rohrer	re-elected	Republican	Samuel E. Rohrer	23,261	100
129	Republican	Sheila Miller	re-elected	Republican	Sheila Miller	18,382	65.9
129	Republican	Sheila Miller	re-elected	Democratic	Lynn H. Schaeffer	9,523	34.1
130	Republican	Dennis E. Leh	re-elected	Republican	Dennis E. Leh	19,392	65.9
130	Republican	Dennis E. Leh	re-elected	Democratic	Dwayne Clemens	10,035	34.1
131	Republican	Pat Browne	re-elected	Republican	Pat Browne	15,367	90.8
131	Republican	Pat Browne	re-elected	Green	James Goodley	881	5.2
131	Republican	Pat Browne	re-elected	Independent	Drake E. Minder	685	4
132	Democratic	Jennifer Mann	re-elected	Democratic	Jennifer Mann	15,021	71.3
132	Democratic	Jennifer Mann	re-elected	Republican	Adam Marles	6,048	28.7
133	Democratic	T. J. Rooney	re-elected	Democratic	T.J. Rooney	14,252	67.5
133	Democratic	T. J. Rooney	re-elected	Republican	Albert V.F. Nelthropp	6,554	31.1
133	Democratic	T. J. Rooney	re-elected	Green	Guy Gray	293	1.4
134	Republican	Douglas G. Reichley	re-elected	Republican	Douglas G. Reichley	21,171	90.4
134	Republican	Douglas G. Reichley	re-elected	Green	Patrick St. John	2,237	9.6
135	Democratic	Steve Samuelson	re-elected	Democratic	Steve Samuelson	16,960	65.1
135	Democratic	Steve Samuelson	re-elected	Republican	David A. Donio	9,098	34.9
136	Democratic	Robert Freeman	re-elected	Democratic	Robert Freeman	15,363	65.8
136	Democratic	Robert Freeman	re-elected	Republican	John Cusick	7,970	34.2
137	Democratic	Richard T. Grucela	re-elected	Democratic	Richard T. Grucela	17,438	58.5
137	Democratic	Richard T. Grucela	re-elected	Republican	Joe Emrick	12,383	41.5
138	Republican	Craig A. Dally	re-elected	Republican	Craig A. Dally	19,905	100
139	Republican	Jerry Birmelin	re-elected	Republican	Jerry Birmelin	18,331	100
140	Democratic	Thomas C. Corrigan	re-elected	Democratic	Thomas C. Corrigan	18,338	100
141	Democratic	Anthony J. Melio	re-elected	Democratic	Anthony J. Melio	18,340	72
141	Democratic	Anthony J. Melio	re-elected	Republican	George Dranginis	7,126	28
142	Republican	Matthew N. Wright	re-elected	Republican	Matthew N. Wright	18,124	58.7
142	Republican	Matthew N. Wright	re-elected	Democratic	John T. Krimmel, Sr.	12,744	41.3
143	Republican	Chuck McIlhinney	re-elected	Republican	Chuck McIlhinney	19,944	60.6
143	Republican	Chuck McIlhinney	re-elected	Democratic	Neil Samuels	12,960	39.4
144	Republican	Katharine M. Watson	re-elected	Republican	Katharine M. Watson	20,985	66.2
144	Republican	Katharine M. Watson	re-elected	Democratic	James J. Trimble	10,738	33.8
145	Republican	Paul I. Clymer	re-elected	Republican	Paul I. Clymer	19,268	64.9
145	Republican	Paul I. Clymer	re-elected	Democratic	John A. Norvaisas	10,417	35.1
146	Republican	Mary Ann Dailey	retired	Republican	Thomas J. Quigley	13,885	51.9
146	Republican	Mary Ann Dailey	retired	Democratic	Dan Weand	12,882	48.1
147	Republican	Raymond Bunt	re-elected	Republican	Raymond Bunt	19,237	100
148	Republican	Melissa Murphy Weber	defeated	Democratic	Mike Gerber	17,844	50.2
148	Republican	Melissa Murphy Weber	defeated	Republican	Melissa Murphy Weber	17,382	48.9
148	Republican	Melissa Murphy Weber	defeated	Libertarian	Eric R. Ebeling	338	1.0
149	Democratic	Daylin Leach	re-elected	Democratic	Daylin Leach	20,039	62
149	Democratic	Daylin Leach	re-elected	Republican	Brad Murphy	12,274	38
150	Republican	Jacqueline R. Crahalla	re-elected	Republican	Jacqueline R. Crahalla	15,881	55.4
150	Republican	Jacqueline R. Crahalla	re-elected	Democratic	Rebecca Wall	12,761	44.6
151	Republican	Eugene F. McGill	re-elected	Republican	Eugene F. McGill	17,548	58
151	Republican	Eugene F. McGill	re-elected	Democratic	Anita O'Hara Pieri	12,707	42
152	Republican	Susan E. Cornell	re-elected	Republican	Susan E. Cornell	16,729	56.4
152	Republican	Susan E. Cornell	re-elected	Democratic	Ross Schriftman	12,916	43.6
153	Republican	Ellen M. Bard	ran for Congress	Democratic	Josh Shapiro	18,237	54.3
153	Republican	Ellen M. Bard	ran for Congress	Republican	Jon D. Fox	15,022	44.7
153	Republican	Ellen M. Bard	ran for Congress	Libertarian	Matthew Wusinich	316	0.9
154	Democratic	Lawrence H. Curry	re-elected	Democratic	Lawrence H. Curry	25,662	74.8
154	Democratic	Lawrence H. Curry	re-elected	Republican	Jeffrey K. Belford	8,634	25.2
155	Republican	Curt Schroder	re-elected	Republican	Curt Schroder	25,061	100
156	Republican	Elinor Z. Taylor	re-elected	Republican	Elinor Z. Taylor	17,030	54.5
156	Republican	Elinor Z. Taylor	re-elected	Democratic	Barbara McIlvaine Smith	14,200	45.5
157	Republican	Carole A. Rubley	re-elected	Republican	Carole A. Rubley	22,151	88.9
157	Republican	Carole A. Rubley	re-elected	Libertarian	James Babb	2,761	11.1
158	Republican	L. Chris Ross	re-elected	Republican	L. Chris Ross	19,622	65.1
158	Republican	L. Chris Ross	re-elected	Democratic	Mario J. Calvarese	10,516	34.9
159	Democratic	Thaddeus Kirkland	re-elected	Democratic	Thaddeus Kirkland	14,779	69.2
159	Democratic	Thaddeus Kirkland	re-elected	Republican	Nolan O. Woodland	6,585	30.8
160	Republican	Stephen Barrar	re-elected	Republican	Stephen E. Barrar	22,288	65.9
160	Republican	Stephen Barrar	re-elected	Democratic	Mike McGann	11,519	34.1
161	Republican	Tom Gannon	re-elected	Republican	Tom Gannon	19,750	100
162	Republican	Ron Raymond	re-elected	Republican	Ron Raymond	17,443	63.6
162	Republican	Ron Raymond	re-elected	Democratic	Catherine Marie Celley	9727	35.4
162	Republican	Ron Raymond	re-elected	Libertarian	David Jahn	273	1
163	Republican	Nicholas A. Micozzie	re-elected	Republican	Nicholas A. Micozzie	17,866	61
163	Republican	Nicholas A. Micozzie	re-elected	Democratic	Rose Izzo	11,421	39
164	Republican	Mario J. Civera	re-elected	Republican	Mario J. Civera	14,202	55.5
164	Republican	Mario J. Civera	re-elected	Democratic	Josh Richard	11,409	44.5
165	Republican	William F. Adolph	re-elected	Republican	William F. Adolph	20,149	64.7
165	Republican	William F. Adolph	re-elected	Democratic	Dustin L. Gettel	11,003	35.3
166	Democratic	Greg Vitali	re-elected	Democratic	Greg Vitali	20,979	59.9
166	Democratic	Greg Vitali	re-elected	Republican	John P. Williamson	14,041	40.1
167	Republican	Bob Flick	re-elected	Republican	Bob Flick	25,812	100
168	Republican	Thomas H. Killion	re-elected	Republican	Thomas H. Killion	21,698	100
169	Republican	Dennis M. O'Brien	re-elected	Republican	Dennis M. O'Brien	19,231	100
170	Republican	George T. Kenney	re-elected	Republican	George T. Kenney	15,498	57.7
170	Republican	George T. Kenney	re-elected	Democratic	Brendan F. Boyle	11,362	42.3
171	Republican	Kerry A. Benninghoff	re-elected	Republican	Kerry A. Benninghoff	18,190	66.6
171	Republican	Kerry A. Benninghoff	re-elected	Democratic	Rich Rogers	9,143	33.5
172	Republican	John M. Perzel	re-elected	Republican	John M. Perzel	22,210	74.7
172	Republican	John M. Perzel	re-elected	Democratic	Tim Kearney	7,522	25.3
173	Democratic	Michael P. McGeehan	re-elected	Democratic	Michael Patrick McGeehan	17,285	80.7
173	Democratic	Michael P. McGeehan	re-elected	Republican	Don Norlie	4,133	19.3
174	Democratic	Alan Butkovitz	re-elected	Democratic	Alan Butkovitz	17,544	76.4
174	Democratic	Alan Butkovitz	re-elected	Republican	Aida Aloian	5,413	23.6
175	Democratic	Marie Lederer	re-elected	Democratic	Marie Lederer	19,772	81.1
175	Democratic	Marie Lederer	re-elected	Republican	Greg Mester, Jr.	4,607	18.9
176	Republican	Mario Scavello	re-elected	Republican	Mario M. Scavello	13,159	58.9
176	Republican	Mario Scavello	re-elected	Democratic	Joe Metzgar	8,348	37.4
177	Republican	John J. Taylor	re-elected	Republican	John J. Taylor	15137	100
178	Republican	Scott A. Petri	re-elected	Republican	Scott Petri	21,191	61.7
178	Republican	Scott A. Petri	re-elected	Democratic	Michael A. Lavanga	12,674	36.9
178	Republican	Scott A. Petri	re-elected	Libertarian	Jay Russell	461	1.3
179	Democratic	William W. Rieger	re-elected	Democratic	William W. Rieger	15,927	84
179	Democratic	William W. Rieger	re-elected	Republican	Michael B. Berry	3,025	16
180	Democratic	Angel Cruz	re-elected	Democratic	Angel L. Cruz	15,591	85.7
180	Democratic	Angel Cruz	re-elected	Republican	Matthew J. Slonaker, Sr.	2,599	14.3
181	Democratic	W. Curtis Thomas	re-elected	Democratic	W. Curtis Thomas	22,679	100
182	Democratic	Babette Josephs	re-elected	Democratic	Babette Josephs	23,969	80
182	Democratic	Babette Josephs	re-elected	Republican	Andrew Terhune	5,981	20
183	Republican	Julie Harhart	re-elected	Republican	Julie Harhart	18,145	100
184	Democratic	William F. Keller	re-elected	Democratic	William F. Keller	18,930	78.8
184	Democratic	William F. Keller	re-elected	Republican	Mark R. Colangelo	5,083	21.2
185	Democratic	Robert C. Donatucci	re-elected	Democratic	Robert C. Donatucci	18,862	80.6
185	Democratic	Robert C. Donatucci	re-elected	Republican	Joseph T. Apple	4,535	19.4
186	Democratic	Harold James	re-elected	Democratic	Harold James	22,375	92.5
186	Democratic	Harold James	re-elected	Republican	James M. Goldman	1,802	7.5
187	Republican	Paul W. Semmel	re-elected	Republican	Paul W. Semmel	19,576	100
188	Democratic	James R. Roebuck	re-elected	Democratic	James R. Roebuck	22,252	100
189	Republican	Kelly Lewis	re-elected	Republican	Kelly Lewis	13,962	100
190	Democratic	Michael Horsey	defeated in primary	Democratic	Thomas W. Blackwell IV	24,725	95.3
190	Democratic	Michael Horsey	defeated in primary	Republican	Vanessa L. Brown	1,214	4.7
191	Democratic	Ronald G. Waters	re-elected	Democratic	Ronald G. Waters	22,363	100
192	Democratic	Louise Bishop	re-elected	Democratic	Louise Bishop	25,236	100
193	Republican	Steven R. Nickol	re-elected	Republican	Steven R. Nickol	20,533	92.2
193	Republican	Steven R. Nickol	re-elected	Green	Thomas J. Marti	1,731	7.8
194	Democratic	Kathy M. Manderino	re-elected	Democratic	Kathy Manderino	22,413	100
195	Democratic	Frank L. Oliver	re-elected	Democratic	Frank L. Oliver	24,722	100
196	Republican	Beverly Mackereth	re-elected	Republican	Beverly Mackereth	20,942	95.7
196	Republican	Beverly Mackereth	re-elected	Libertarian	William Keslar	936	4.3
197	Democratic	Jewell Williams	re-elected	Democratic	Jewell Williams	24,655	94.1
197	Democratic	Jewell Williams	re-elected	Republican	Lewis Harris, Jr.	1,544	5.9
198	Democratic	Rosita C. Youngblood	re-elected	Democratic	Rosita C. Youngblood	24,300	100
199	Republican	William I. Gabig	re-elected	Republican	Will Gabig	15,007	58.3
199	Republican	William I. Gabig	re-elected	Democratic	Christian R. Muniz	10,728	41.7
200	Democratic	Leanna M. Washington	re-elected	Democratic	Leanna M. Washington	28,164	100
201	Democratic	John Myers	re-elected	Democratic	John Myers	24975	100
202	Democratic	Mark B. Cohen	re-elected	Democratic	Mark B. Cohen	18,576	79.2
202	Democratic	Mark B. Cohen	re-elected	Republican	Gary Grisafi	4,882	20.8
203	Democratic	Dwight Evans	re-elected	Democratic	Dwight Evans	23956	100
