= Jake Banta =

American politician

Member of the Pennsylvania House of Representatives from the 4th district
- Incumbent
- Assumed office January 3, 2023
- Preceded by: Curt Sonney

Personal details
- Born: c. 1965 Waterford, Pennsylvania, U.S.
- Party: Republican (2009-present)
- Other political affiliations: Democratic (2004-2009)
- Education: Fort LeBoeuf High School
- Website: www.repbanta.com

Military service
- Branch/service: United States Navy
- Unit: SEALs

Jacob Daniel Banta (born c. 1965) is an American politician and musician who currently represents the 4th District in the Pennsylvania House of Representatives since 2023. He is a member of the Republican Party.

== Early life and career ==
Banta was born in Waterford, Pennsylvania, and grew up on his family's farm in LeBoeuf Township, Pennsylvania. Following graduation from Fort LeBoeuf High School in 1983, Banta enlisted in the United States Navy, ultimately becoming a Navy SEAL; he was honorably discharged. After the 9/11 attacks, Banta worked as a security contractor with the U.S. Department of Defense in the Middle East.

== Political career ==
In 2022, Banta ran to represent the 4th District in the Pennsylvania House of Representatives, following the retirement of Curt Sonney. He won the six-person Republican primary election, and went on to defeat Democrat Chelsea Oliver in the general election.

For the 2025–2026 Session, Banta serves on the following committees:

- Game & Fisheries
- Local Government
- State Government
  - Subcommittee on Government Integrity & Transparency Republican Chair
- Tourism, Recreation & Economic Development
- Veterans Affairs & Emergency Preparedness

== Political positions ==
=== Abortion ===
Banta has described himself as "pro-life." He has previously said he does not support a ban on abortion, but has suggested he would be open to one which makes exceptions for rape, incest, and the life of the mother.

=== COVID-19 ===
Banta opposed public health mandates put in place during the COVID-19 pandemic. After an airline employee took issue with the non-surgical mask he was wearing, Banta elected to no longer fly while the federal mandate was in place. He has promoted using Ivermectin to treat COVID, despite there being no medical basis for the use of the drug in treating the disease. According to Banta, he was let go as a military contractor over his refusal to get the COVID-19 vaccine and now regrets receiving other vaccinations that were required of him when joining the military.

==== COVID-related conspiracy theories ====
Banta has spoken of a "plandemic" conspiracy and claimed COVID-19 was created by Bill Gates, Anthony Fauci, and China as part of a globalist plot to depopulate the world. He also claims the COVID vaccine has killed more people than the virus itself. In a Gab post, Banta claimed COVID test swabs, masks, and COVID vaccines contain lethal amounts of graphene oxide.

=== Election reforms ===
Banta supports the overturning of Pennsylvania's mail-in voting law. He also supports voter ID and advocates for the presence of serial numbers on ballots.

=== Promotion of conspiracy theories ===
Banta has used several social media sites, including Facebook, Gab, and Truth Social, to promote conspiracy theories and falsehoods sourced from various far-right websites. Some of his online comments caused his Facebook account to be suspended. He also claims the FBI visited his home in response to his rhetoric, a claim which has gone unverified. Banta additionally administers a 5,300-member private Facebook paged titled "I am America." Several members have posted QAnon content on the page. Although Banta himself has not posted QAnon content, several of his posts have similar language to QAnon conspiracy theories.

Banta denies the result of the 2020 United States presidential election and claims it was stolen from President Donald Trump by Democrats. He also claims that Pennsylvania State Representative Ryan Bizzarro won his 2020 election because of fraud. There is no evidence to support either claim. Banta has claimed that the January 6 Capitol attack was orchestrated by Trump's political opponents to sabotage his career. At the same time, he has voiced support for those who attacked the Capitol building, referring to them as "patriots."

Banta has promoted the New World Order conspiracy theory, alleging mandates related to the COVID-19 pandemic, gun control, and "stolen" elections were part of a plot to establish a global Marxist state. The primary perpetrators of the New World Order, he claims, are the World Health Organization, World Economic Forum, and Democratic politicians, including President Joe Biden.

== Personal life ==
Banta is married to Shelly, and lives in LeBoeuf Township, Pennsylvania. He has three children and two grandchildren.

Banta is the lead singer and guitarist in his band Jake's Blues. His music is influence by Stevie Ray Vaughan and has recorded several of his own albums. He previously recorded with the band Double Trouble. Banta performed the national anthem at two rallies for President Donald Trump.

== Electoral history ==
2022 Pennsylvania House of Representatives Republican primary election, District 4
Party	Candidate	Votes	%
Republican	Jake Banta	3,702	41.98
Republican	Jason Monn	2,321	26.32
Republican	Greg Hayes	1,072	12.15
Republican	Joe Cancilla	773	8.77
Republican	Jennifer Lesher	732	8.3
Republican	John D. Diamond	201	2.28
Write-in		18	0.2
Total votes		8,819	100.00

2022 Pennsylvania House of Representatives election, District 4
Party	Candidate	Votes	%
Republican	Jake Banta	16,375	61.44
Democratic	Chelsea Oliver	10,276	38.56
Total votes		26,651	100.00

2024 Pennsylvania House of Representatives election, District 4
Party	Candidate	Votes	%
Republican	Jake Banta (incumbent)	22,686	67.54
Democratic	Joe Cancilla	10,845	32.29
Write-in		56	0.17
Total votes		33,587	100.00
