= Matt Lynch (basketball) =

American basketball coach

Personal information
- Born: 1990 or 1991 (age 35–36) Erie, Pennsylvania
- Education: Edinboro University; Miami University
- Occupation: Basketball coach

Matt Lynch is a college basketball coach. In 2023 he created from scratch the University of South Carolina Salkehatchie men's basketball team.

== Early life and education ==
Lynch is from Erie, Pennsylvania. He is the son of Irma and Bill Lynch; his father played basketball in college. He has a brother and a sister. He played basketball in high school at Fort LeBoeuf High School in Waterford, Pennsylvania.

He attended Edinboro University, graduating in 2013 with a bachelor's degree in Health and Education. He graduated in 2015 from Miami University with a master's degree in Kinesiology and Sports Psychology.

== Career ==
Lynch first worked as an assistant coach at Fort Leboeuf during his freshman year in college. He then started working in the basketball program at Edinboro while attending school there.

Lynch worked at Miami, starting as video coordinator and later working as interim assistant coach for the women's basketball team, and then moved to the men's program at Youngstown State as director of basketball operations under Jerry Slocum. He worked as video coordinator, then director of basketball operations and then assistant for University of North Carolina Wilmington under C. B. McGrath until March 2020; he and the rest of the team staff were let go after three losing seasons. He worked as an assistant coach at Chowan University.

In December 2022 Lynch was hired by Salkehatchie. The team had been disbanded prior to that year's season after having four head coaches leave within an eight-month period; the team had no players signed, no games scheduled, and no budget. Lynch rebuilt the team from scratch with an all-freshman roster, including Grayson Kirk, an All-State guard. Salkehatchie had a winning season in 2023-2024.

== Recognition ==
In 2021 Lynch was named to Forbes' "30 Under 30" list of sportspeople.

== Personal life ==
As of 2024 Lynch was the only out gay head coach in college men’s basketball.
