= Eagle Hotel (Waterford, Pennsylvania) =

United States historic place

- U.S. National Register of Historic Places
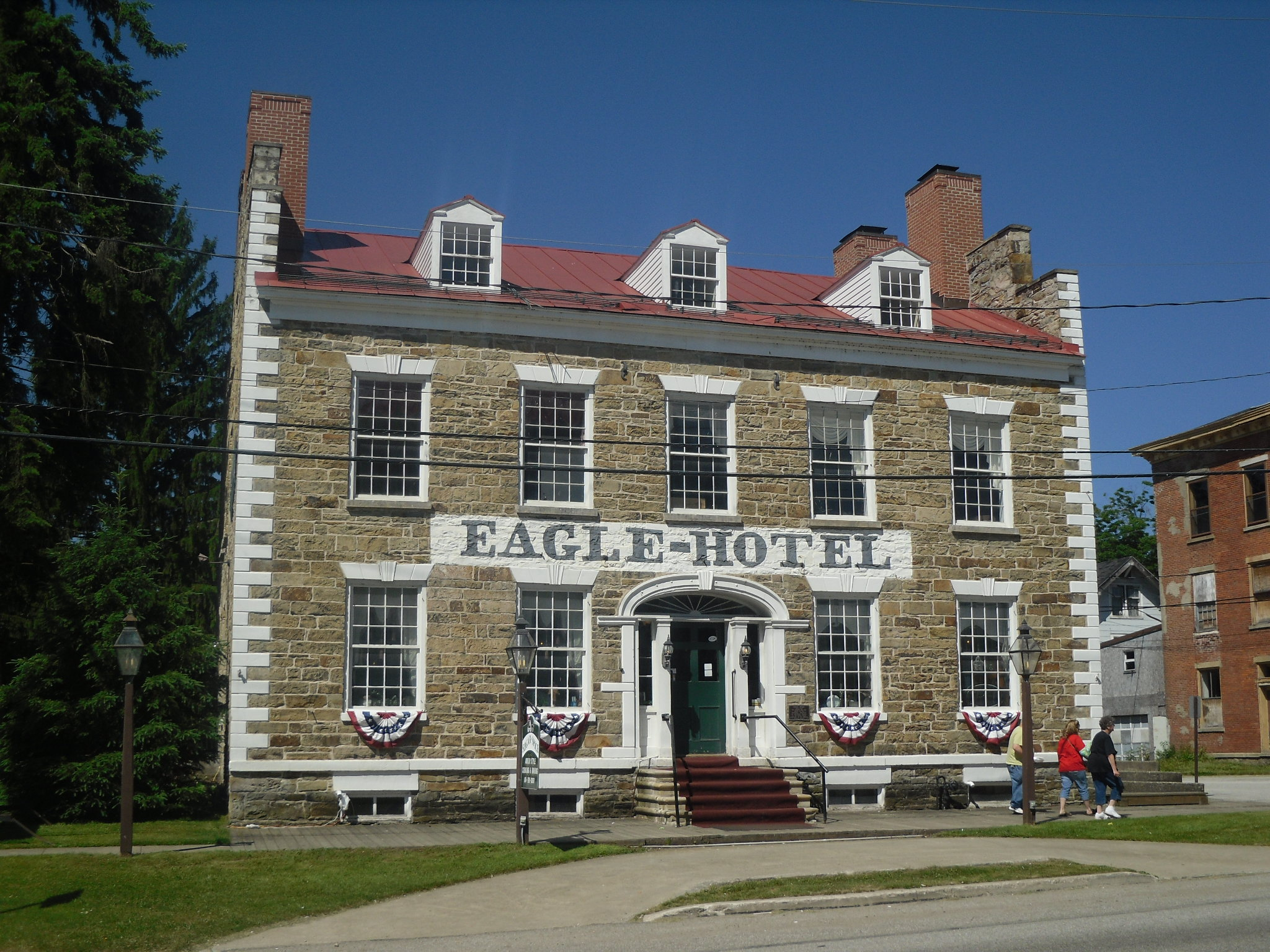

- Location within Pennsylvania
- Location: 32 High Street; Waterford, Pennsylvania
- Coordinates: 41°56′25″N 79°58′59″W
- Built: 1826
- Built by: Thomas King
- Architectural style: Georgian
- NRHP reference No.: 77001167
- Added to NRHP: November 28, 1977

The Eagle Hotel, also called the Stone Hotel, is a former hotel built in 1826 in Waterford, Erie County in the U.S. state of Pennsylvania. It was documented by the Historic American Buildings Survey in 1933 and was listed on the National Register of Historic Places on November 28, 1977. The first floor of the Eagle Hotel is used by the Sugar 'n Spice restaurant, with the second and third floors used as a museum by the Fort Le Boeuf Historical Society.

== Design ==
The Eagle Hotel is located on High Street (U.S. Route 19) in the borough of Waterford. The hotel is a 2 1/2-story, L-shaped building constructed out of fieldstone from a nearby quarry. The main, front portion of the Eagle Hotel is 40 by 50 feet (12 m × 15 m) with "five bays across and four bays deep", while the rear portion is 36 by 20 feet (11.0 m × 6.1 m). The architecture of the Eagle Hotel "exceeds that of a typical hotel" of the period, with decorative stone features like "corbel ends" and quoining.

== History ==
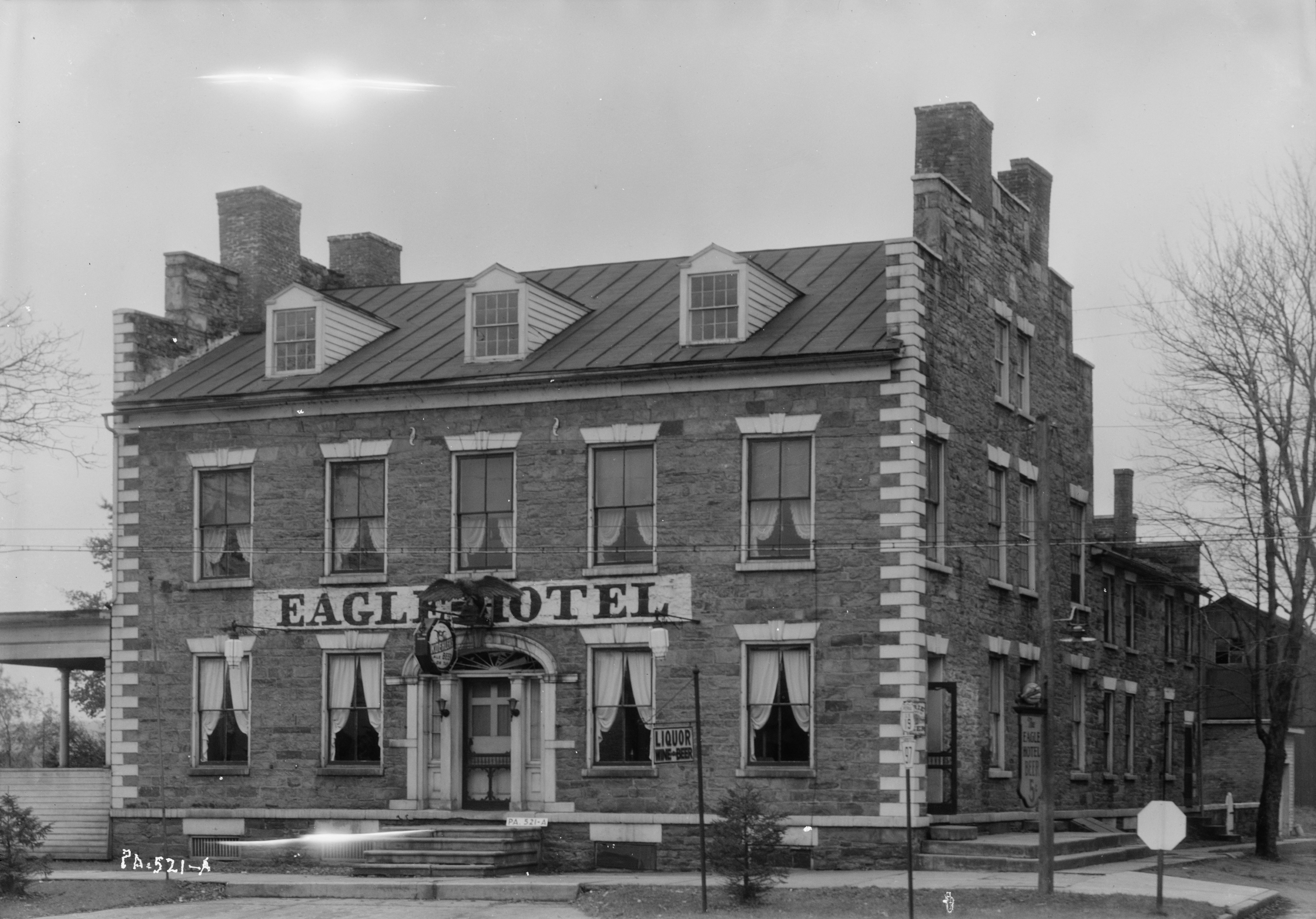
HABS photo of the hotel in 1933.

The Eagle Hotel was constructed in 1826 by Thomas King. It was built at a time when "plank road, turnpikes, canals and later railroads went through or near Waterford." Also, the Waterford was used as a "terminal and distribution point" for the developing salt industry in New York. The Eagle Hotel was documented by the Historic American Buildings Survey (HABS) in 1933. The hotel was listed on the National Register of Historic Places on November 28, 1977. The hotel was purchased by the Fort Le Boeuf Historical Society to preserve it and to prevent it from being demolished. The Eagle Hotel was renovated and the kitchen modernized from October 1997 to February 1998. A restaurant was opened in the hotel but closed several months later. In October 1998, the Eagle Hotel was leased by the owners of the Sugar 'n Spice in Titusville, Pennsylvania to open another location of the restaurant in the hotel. The hotel was designated a contributing property to the Waterford Borough Historic District on March 9, 1990.

== See also ==
- National Register of Historic Places listings in Erie County, Pennsylvania

== Sources ==
- Dunlevey, Charles (October 1976). National Register of Historic Places Registration: Pennsylvania SP Eagle Hotel. National Archives and Records Administration. (Downloading may be slow.)
