= Pennsylvania House of Representatives, District 4 =

American legislative district

Pennsylvania's 4th State House of Representatives district
Representative
Jake Banta; R–Waterford
- Population (2022): 64,282

The 4th District of the Pennsylvania House of Representatives is located in northwest Pennsylvania and has been represented by Jake Banta since 2023.

== District profile ==
The 4th Pennsylvania House of Representatives District is located in Erie County and includes the following areas:

- Amity Township
- Concord Township
- Franklin Township
- Corry
- Edinboro
- Elgin
- Girard
- Girard Township
- Greenfield Township
- Lake City
- LeBoeuf Township
- McKean
- McKean Township
- Mill Village
- North East
- North East Township
- Platea
- Union City
- Union Township
- Venango Township
- Washington Township
- Waterford
- Waterford Township
- Wattsburg
- Wayne Township

== Representatives ==
Representative	Party	Years	District home	Notes
Before 1969, seats were apportioned by county.
Forest Hopkins	Republican	1969 – 1978	North East	Died in office on April 27, but defeated in May 14 primary.
Harry Bowser	Republican	1979 – 1988	North East Township	Defeated in general election.
Tom Scrimenti	Democrat	1989 – 2004	North East	Defeated in general election.
Curt Sonney	Republican	2005 – 2022	Harborcreek Township	
Jake Banta	Republican	2023 – present	Waterford	Incumbent

== Recent election results ==
PA House election, 2024: Pennsylvania House, District 4
Party	Candidate	Votes	%
Republican	Jake Banta (incumbent)	22,412	67.85
Democratic	Joe Cancilla	10,619	32.15
Total votes		33,031	100.00
Republican hold			

PA House election, 2022: Pennsylvania House, District 4
Party	Candidate	Votes	%
Republican	Jake Banta	16,375	61.44
Democratic	Chelsea Oliver	10,276	38.56
Total votes		26,651	100.00
Republican hold			

PA House election, 2020: Pennsylvania House, District 4
Party	Candidate	Votes	%
Republican	Curt Sonney (incumbent)	Unopposed	
Total votes		26,762	100.00
Republican hold			

PA House election, 2018: Pennsylvania House, District 4
Party	Candidate	Votes	%
Republican	Curt Sonney (incumbent)	Unopposed	
Total votes		17,389	100.00
Republican hold			

PA House election, 2016: Pennsylvania House, District 4
Party	Candidate	Votes	%
Republican	Curt Sonney (incumbent)	Unopposed	
Total votes		22,790	100.00
Republican hold			

PA House election, 2014: Pennsylvania House, District 4
Party	Candidate	Votes	%	±%
Republican	Curt Sonney (incumbent)	10,762	63.73	−36.27
Democratic	Curtis Smith	6,124	36.27	+36.27
Margin of victory		4,638	27.47	−27.47
Turnout		16,886	100	

PA House election, 2012: Pennsylvania House, District 4
Party	Candidate	Votes	%
Republican	Curt Sonney (incumbent)	Unopposed	
Total votes		18,867	100.00
Republican hold			

PA House election, 2010: Pennsylvania House, District 4
Party	Candidate	Votes	%	±%
Republican	Curt Sonney (incumbent)	13,401	72.65	+5.81
Democratic	Gerald Price	5,046	27.35	−5.81
Margin of victory		8,356	45.29	+11.61
Turnout		18,448	100	
