= Harry Bowser =

American politician (1931–2024)

Harry E. Bowser

Member of the Pennsylvania House of Representatives from the 4th district
- In office January 2, 1979 – November 30, 1988
- Preceded by: Forest Hopkins
- Succeeded by: Tom Scrimenti

Personal details
- Born: September 13, 1931 Brookville, Pennsylvania
- Died: February 22, 2024 (aged 92) North East Township, Pennsylvania
- Party: Republican
- Spouse: Carol Lee
- Children: 3
- Occupation: Politician, barber

Harry Eugene Bowser (September 13, 1931 – February 22, 2024) was a barber, grape farmer, and Republican member of the Pennsylvania House of Representatives from 1979 to 1988, serving Erie County. He was a Korean War veteran.

== Biography ==
Bowser was born on September 13, 1931 in Brookville, Pennsylvania. He attended Brookville High School and later barber school. From 1949 to 1952, Bowser served in the United States Marine Corps in the Korean War.

Upon his return to the United States, Bowser worked as a barber until 1972, when he and his wife Carol bought a 65-acre grape farm.

Bowser's first foray into politics was as a councilor for North East Township in 1969 and in 1978 he was elected to the Pennsylvania House of Representatives, ultimately serving for four consecutive terms. As a representative, Bowser served as the state house Republican caucus administrator and in the Special Bipartisan Committee to Investigate Food and Cheese Distribution in 1984. He lost reelection in 1988.

== Personal life ==
Bowser married Carol Lee MacTarnaghan in 1955. They had three sons; Timothy, Dennis, and Andrew.
