= La Salle College High School =

School in Wyndmoor, Pennsylvania, United States

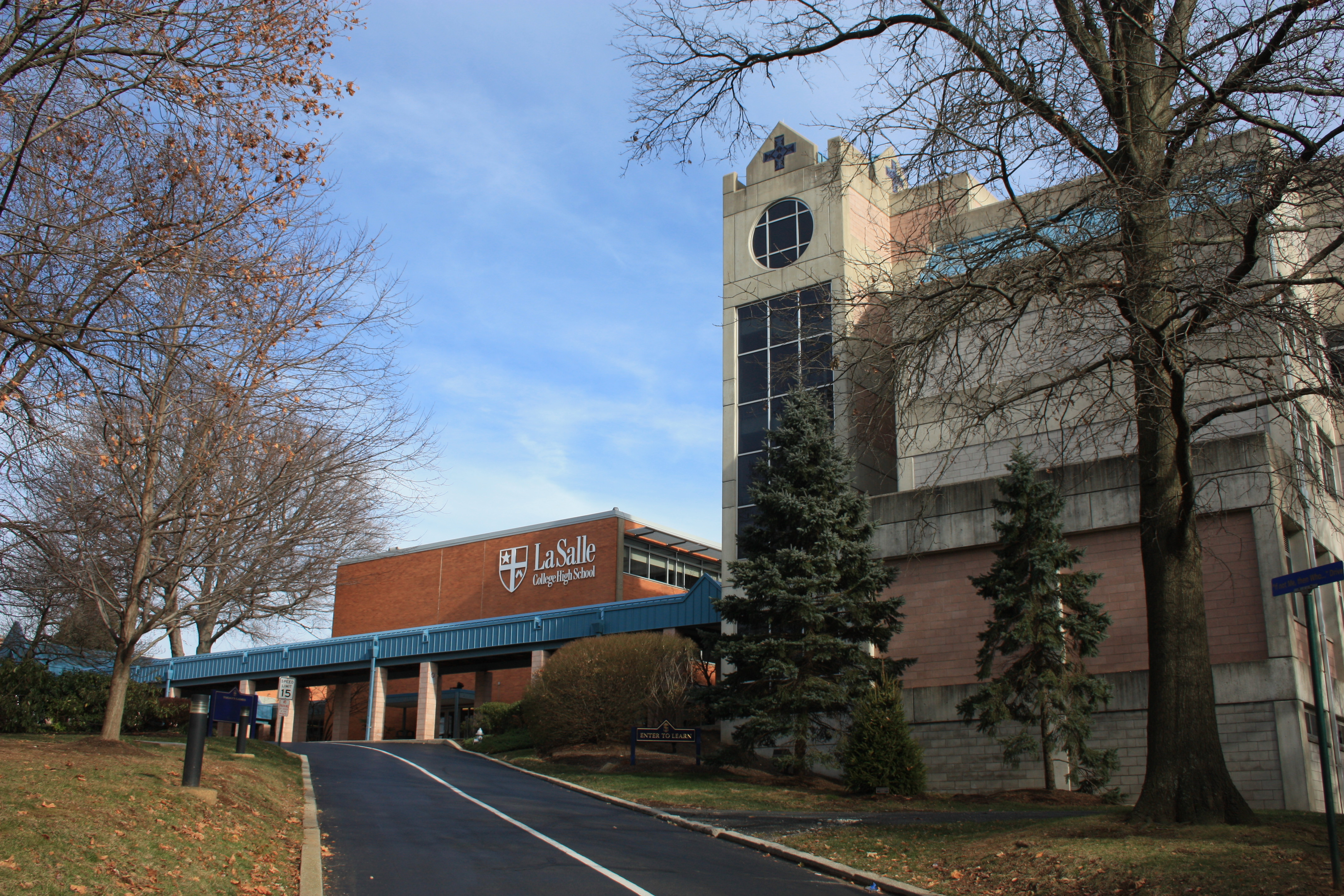

Location
- 8605 West Cheltenham Avenue; Wyndmoor, Springfield Township, Montgomery County, Pennsylvania 19038; United States; 40°5′41″N 75°11′24″W

Information
- Former names: Select School; Christian Brothers Academy
- Type: Private, Catholic, all-male college-preparatory school
- Motto: Latin: Virtus et Scientia (Character and Knowledge)
- Religious affiliation: Christian
- Denomination: Roman Catholic
- Patron saint: Jean-Baptiste de La Salle
- Established: 1858; 168 years ago
- Founder: De La Salle Brothers
- Status: Currently operational
- CEEB code: 393370
- NCES School ID: 01186933
- President: Bro. James L. Butler, FSC
- Principal: James Fyke
- Chaplain: Fr. Anthony Janton
- Faculty: 102.5 (on an FTE basis)
- Grades: 9–12
- Gender: All-male
- Enrollment: 1,158 (2023–2024)
- Student to teacher ratio: 11.3
- Campus size: 84 acres (34 ha)
- Campus type: Suburban
- Colors: Blue & gold
- Slogan: Enter to Learn. Leave to Serve.
- Song: Hail La Salle
- Athletics conference: Philadelphia Catholic League; PIAA
Sports
Baseball
Basketball
Bowling
Cross country
Football
Golf
Hockey
Lacrosse
Rowing
Rugby VII
Rugby XV
Soccer
Squash
Swimming
Tennis
Indoor track
Outdoor track & field
Volleyball
Water polo
Wrestling
- Mascot: Explorer
- Team name: Explorers
- Rival: St. Joseph's Preparatory School
- Accreditation: Middle States Association of Colleges and Schools
- National ranking: Best Catholic High Schools in the US No. 123 of 1,144
- Publication: The Gazebo (literary magazine)
- Newspaper: The Wisterian
- Yearbook: Blue and Gold
- School fees: $460–$11,180
- Tuition: $30,000 (2026-2027)
- Website: www.lschs.org

La Salle College High School is a Catholic, all-male college preparatory school located in Wyndmoor, a community in Springfield Township, Montgomery County, Pennsylvania, United States. La Salle is within the Archdiocese of Philadelphia, and is located roughly 10 miles northwest of Center City. The school is staffed by a lay faculty and the Christian Brothers. Its sports teams compete in the Philadelphia Catholic League, and the PIAA’s twelfth district.

== History ==
La Salle began in 1858 at St. Michael's School at 2nd and Jefferson Streets in the West Kensington section of Philadelphia. Initially the Select School, it was soon renamed the Christian Brothers Academy. In 1863, it became the preparatory school to La Salle College (now La Salle University). The prep school and college shared the same campus for nearly a century, moving once in 1867 to Juniper and Filbert Streets in the heart of Center City and again in 1882 to the mansion of Michael Bouvier, a prominent Philadelphia banker, located on North Broad Street near Girard Avenue. In 1929, La Salle moved to the university’s present campus in the Logan section of upper North Philadelphia. In 1960, the preparatory school moved to the former Belcroft Estate of Clarence E. Brown. In 1982, they formally became two separate institutions, with the high school forming its own board of trustees.

== Facilities ==
La Salle is situated on an 84-acre campus. The grounds include the school building, which contains a cafeteria, gymnasium, auditorium, student center, the Marian Chapel, a central courtyard, and a meadow featuring a grotto adorned by a shrine to Our Lady of Lourdes. Next to the school is the Christian Brothers' residence, a cottage built in 1927. The campus also includes seven athletic fields, tennis courts, and a four-lane swimming pool.

== Curriculum ==
The credits must satisfy the minimums in religion (4), English (4), mathematics (3), science (3), history & political science (3), world languages (3), physical education & health (1), innovation & design (1), and fine arts (.5). There are a variety of elective courses offered in core subjects as well as social science, innovation & design, visual art, and music. Students must have a minimum of 28 credits to graduate and are required to carry seven each year.

== Extracurricular activities ==
=== Fine Arts ===
La Salle's band program includes a variety of ensembles, such as the pep band, pit orchestra, concert band, and Freshman, Advanced, and Honors Advanced bands. The program also lists three competition bands, namely the Lab Band, the Lab 2 Band, and the Competition Band, each of which features approximately 20-25 musicians who compete in local and regional competitions each year. The choral program consists of a general chorus and a select ensemble called The Belcrofters. Both the band and choral programs perform two individual annual concerts in the fall and spring. Band and Chorus are scheduled classes, and private instruction is available for voice and various instruments.

Each year, La Salle's theatre program performs three productions - one in the fall and two in the spring. The fall production is a collection of one-act plays. The first spring production is a fully staged musical. Recent productions include Anything Goes (2026), Catch Me If You Can (2025), Something Rotten! (2024), and West Side Story (2023). The second spring production is "Broadway Wishes", an original student-run revue consisting of songs from stage and film musicals that raises money for the Make-A-Wish Foundation.

=== Athletics ===
La Salle is a founding member of the Philadelphia Catholic League and has competed in the Pennsylvania Interscholastic Athletic Association since 2009. It is the only school to have won a PCL Championship in every sport, capturing 271 PCL titles, the most among any school competing in the league.

La Salle fields 47 athletics teams in 19 different sports, including baseball, basketball, cross country, football, golf, hockey, lacrosse, rowing, rugby sevens and fifteens, soccer, squash, swimming, tennis, indoor and outdoor track and field, volleyball, water polo, and wrestling. La Salle's student body boasts 339 multi-sport athletes, 108 AP Scholar-Athletes, and a 71% participation rate in athletics.

=== Clubs ===
La Salle sponsors over 50 student clubs in areas including academia, the arts, intramural athletics, business, culture and language, media publications, service, and special interests. Over 85% of the student body is part of at least one club or activity.

== The David Program ==
The David Program, named in honor of Brother David Albert and David Diehl, is an additional academic support service for a limited number of college bound students with documented mild learning disabilities. Students who participate in the David Program have a scheduled period each day that focuses on developing strategies for academic success and empowering the learner. The program is centered around cultivating problem-solving, study, organizational, and self-advocacy skills. The David Program's student-to-teacher ratio is 2:1.

The David Program is a support service for an additional fee with limited openings each year. As of 2023, construction of an addition to the main school building is underway to expand the program.

== Notable alumni ==
- J. Burrwood Daly (1890), US congressman
- Gus Cifelli (1943), Michigan district court judge and NFL offensive tackle
- James J. A. Gallagher (1945), member of the Pennsylvania House of Representatives
- Paul Arizin (1946), member of Basketball Hall of Fame
- Jim Phelan (1947), member of College Basketball Hall of Fame
- Dick Bedesem (1949), college football coach
- Tom Gola (1951), member of Basketball Hall of Fame
- Robert John Brinker (1959), financial advisor and syndicated financial radio show Moneytalk
- John Lehman, Jr. (1960), Secretary of the Navy (1981–87) and member of 9/11 Commission
- Chris Matthews (1963), television commentator on Hardball, syndicated columnist
- Michael McGinniss (1965), president of La Salle University
- Chuck Zapiec (1967), PA Sports Hall of Fame, Penn State All-American linebacker, pro football player
- Leonard Bosack (1969), founder of Cisco Systems
- Jack Bauerle (1970), U.S. Olympic and University of Georgia women's swim coach
- Brig. Gen. Joseph J. McMenamin (1970), Assistant Division Commander, 2nd Marine Division
- Steve Javie (1972), NBA referee
- Joe Mihalich (1974), former head coach, Hofstra Men's Basketball
- George T. Kenney (1975), former member of Pennsylvania House of Representatives from the 170th district
- Joe Webster (1976), member of the Pennsylvania House of Representatives from the 150th district
- Fran McCaffery (1977), head coach, University of Pennsylvania men's basketball
- John Waldron (1977), criminal defense lawyer
- John Schmitt (1980), senior economist, Center for Economic and Policy Research
- Hugh Panaro (1982), Broadway actor, Les Misérables, The Phantom of The Opera
- Michael J. Stack III (1982), former lieutenant governor of Pennsylvania
- George Winslow (1982), professional football punter
- Jim Poole (1984), relief pitcher for Philadelphia Phillies
- Tom Gizzi (1985), football player
- Charles McIlhinney (1985), Pennsylvania State Senator
- John Butler (1991), college and professional football coach
- Sean McDermott (1993), former head coach of the NFL's Buffalo Bills
- Gregory Michael Hosmer (1999), actor, As the World Turns, Greek, How I Met Your Mother
- Anthony Green (2001), musician, Circa Survive
- Frank Cassidy (2008), Assistant Secretary for Housing and Federal Housing Commissioner at the United States Department of Housing and Urban Development
- Tucker Durkin (2009), professional lacrosse player
- Joe McKeehen (2009), 2015 World Series of Poker Main Event winner
- Tyler Nase (2009), Olympic rower
- Darius Madison (2012), professional soccer player
- Matt Rambo (2013), professional lacrosse player, recipient of the 2017 Tewaaraton Award
- Ryan Winslow (2013), professional football punter
- Zaire Franklin (2014), linebacker for the Indianapolis Colts
- Kyle Shurmur (2015), professional football quarterback. Offensive Quality Assistant Coach, Buffalo Bills
- Jimmy Morrissey (2016), center for the New York Giants
- Andrew Cossetti (2018), professional baseball player
- Abdul Carter (2022), linebacker for the New York Giants
- Joey O'Brien (2026), safety for the Notre Dame Fighting Irish
