= Wendell Good =

American politician

Wendell R. Good

Member of the Pennsylvania House of Representatives from the 3rd district
- In office January 7, 1969 – November 30, 1972
- Preceded by: District Created
- Succeeded by: David C. DiCarlo

Member of the Pennsylvania House of Representatives from the Erie County district
- In office January 2, 1967 – November 30, 1968

Personal details
- Born: August 28, 1912 Johnstown, Pennsylvania
- Died: August 23, 1975 (aged 62)
- Party: Republican
- Education: Lafayette College (BS); University of Pennsylvania (LLB)

Wendell R. Good (August 28, 1912 – August 23, 1975) was an attorney and Republican member of the Pennsylvania House of Representatives. Good represented the 3rd district from 1969 to 1972.

== Biography ==
Good was born on August 28, 1912 in Johnstown, Pennsylvania. He attended Erie public schools and obtained a bachelors at Lafayette College, later graduating from the University of Pennsylvania with a bachelor of laws.

After practicing as an attorney, Good was elected to the Pennsylvania House of Representatives in 1966, serving for three consecutive terms. He lost reelection in 1972.

Good died on August 23, 1975 and was buried at Laurel Hill Cemetery in Millcreek Township, Erie County, Pennsylvania.
