= Waterford Borough Historic District =

Historic district in Pennsylvania, United States

- U.S. National Register of Historic Places
- U.S. Historic district
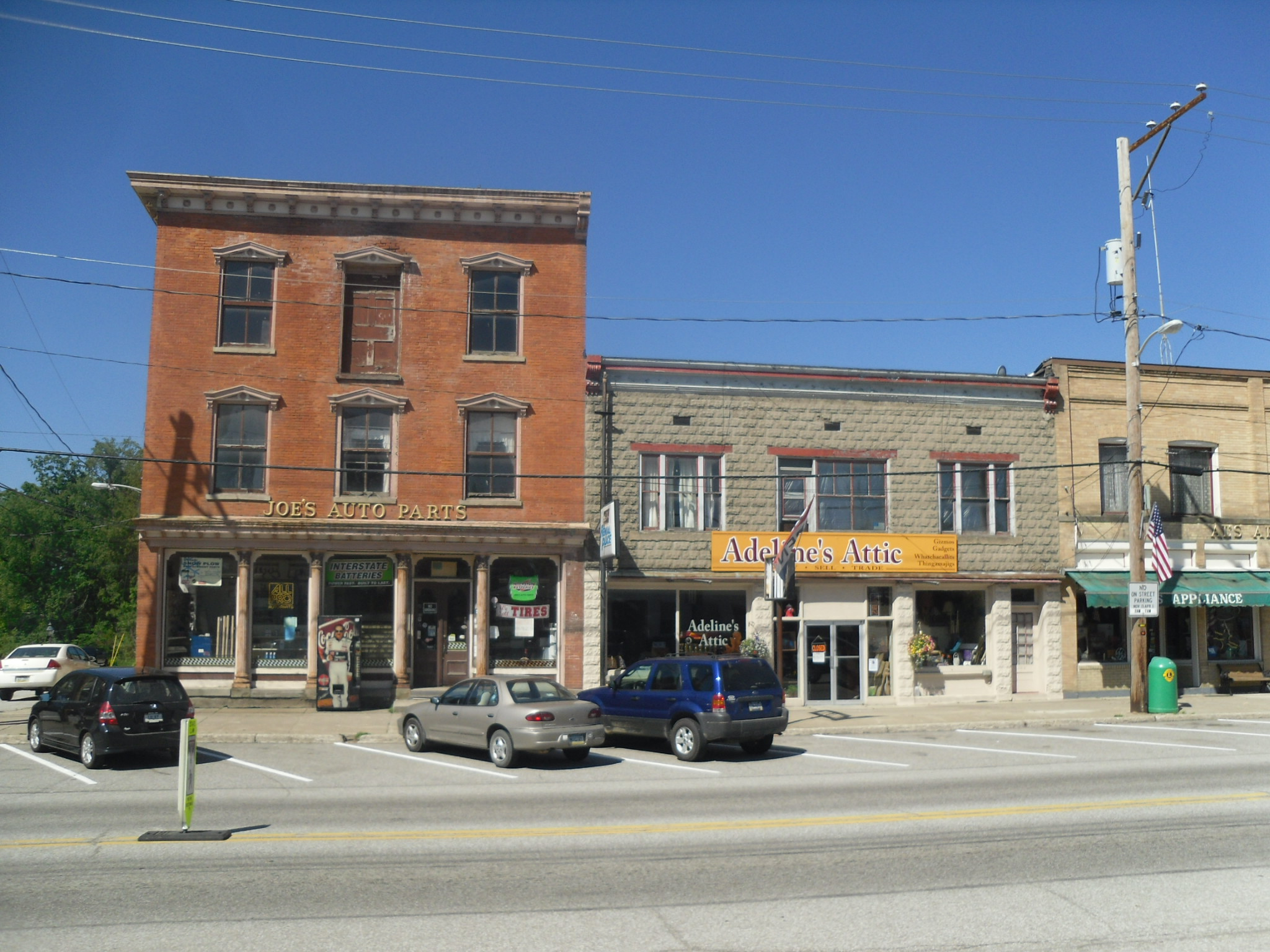
- Waterford, Pennsylvania, May 2010

- Location within Pennsylvania Location within the United States
- Location: Roughly bounded by N. Park Row, High, W. First, and Walnut Sts., Waterford, Pennsylvania
- Coordinates: 41°56′29″N 79°59′05″W
- Area: 21 acres (8.5 ha)
- Architect: Multiple
- Architectural style: Greek Revival, Italianate, Federal
- NRHP reference No.: 90000419
- Added to NRHP: March 9, 1990

The Waterford Borough Historic District is a national historic district that is located in Waterford, Erie County, Pennsylvania.

It was added to the National Register of Historic Places in 1990.

== History and architectural features ==
This district encompasses forty-one contributing buildings that are located in the central business district and surrounding residential areas of Waterford. The district includes commercial and residential buildings that were built between 1820 and 1939. They were created in a variety of popular architectural styles, including Greek Revival, Federal, and Italianate. This district includes the town square. Notable buildings are St. Peter's Episcopal Church (1832), the Presbyterian Church (c. 1850), the Amos Judson House, and Judson's Store (1820). This district also includes the separately listed Eagle Hotel (1826).
