= Brian Milne =

American football player (born 1973)

No. 44, 40
- Position: Running back

Personal information
- Born: January 7, 1973 (age 53); Waterford, Pennsylvania, U.S.
- Listed height: 6 ft 3 in (1.91 m)
- Listed weight: 255 lb (116 kg)

Career information
- High school: Fort LeBoeuf (Waterford)
- College: Penn State
- NFL draft: 1996: 4th round, 115th overall pick

Career history
- Indianapolis Colts (1996)*; Cincinnati Bengals (1996–1999); Seattle Seahawks (1999); New Orleans Saints (2000)
- * Offseason or practice squad member only

Career NFL statistics
- Receptions: 57
- Receiving yards: 324
- Receiving touchdowns: 1
- Rushing yards: 126
- Rushing average: 3.5
- Rushing touchdowns: 4
- Stats at Pro Football Reference

Brian Fitzsimons Milne (born January 7, 1973) is an American former professional football player who was a fullback in the National Football League (NFL). He was selected in the fourth round of the 1996 NFL draft by the Indianapolis Colts. He was waived before the season started and claimed by the Cincinnati Bengals where he played for four seasons. He also played for the Seattle Seahawks and the New Orleans Saints.

== Biography ==
Milne last played for the New Orleans Saints with whom he was a part of play in the 2000 wild card playoff game against the St. Louis Rams, in which Milne recovered the muffed punt off Az-Zahir Hakim with less than 2 minutes left to help the Saints record their first ever playoff win. Saints announcer Jim Henderson made the call:

Hakim drops the ball! Hakim drops the ball! Brian Milne might have fallen on it at the 10 yard line! It's the New Orleans Saints' football! Brian Milne, the most unlikely hero of them all, falls on the fumble, the muff by Hakim! There is a God after all!

Milne had a career at Penn State University, where Head Coach Joe Paterno held a scholarship for Milne as he recovered from cancer treatments as a teenager. As a member of the Nittany Lions in early November 1994 at Illinois, he scored three touchdowns (including the game-winner) in a Penn State victory under Paterno. Penn State went on to beat Oregon in the Rose Bowl to become the first Big Ten team to earn a 12-0 record, finishing second in the polls.

While at Penn State, Milne was also a member of the track & field team. He was a national class discus thrower. Milne threw the 2k discus over 63m/207' for an American Junior Record.

== Sources ==
- Sporting News player bio
- "Hakim Drops The Ball" on YouTube
