= Tom Scrimenti =

American politician

Thomas J. Scrimenti

Member of the Pennsylvania House of Representatives from the 4th district
- In office January 3, 1989 – November 30, 2004
- Preceded by: Harry E. Bowser
- Succeeded by: Curt Sonney

Personal details
- Born: January 28, 1960 (age 66) Erie, Pennsylvania
- Party: Democratic
- Spouse: Pamela
- Children: 4 children
- Education: Gannon University

Thomas J. Scrimenti (born January 28, 1960) is a former Democratic member of the Pennsylvania House of Representatives.

He is a 1978 graduate of North East High School in North East, Pennsylvania. He earned a degree in criminal justice from Gannon University in 1984.

He served as member of the school board of the North East School District from 1979 to 1981 and as mayor of North East, Pennsylvania from 1982 to 1989. He was first elected to represent the 4th legislative district in the Pennsylvania House of Representatives in 1988. He was defeated for re-election in the 2004 election by Republican Curt Sonney.
