= Frank A. Green =

American politician

Frank A. Green (May 22, 1860 – June 14, 1937) was an American farmer and politician.

Green was born on a farm in Waterford, Erie County, Pennsylvania and went to the Pennsylvania public schools. He lived on a farm in Stephen, Marshall County, Minnesota with his wife and family. He was a farmer and had raised cattle. Green also taught school. Green served on the Marshall County Commission and as the Marshall County Sheriff. He also served on the Marshall County School Board and on the Stephen Township Board. Green served in the Minnesota House of Representatives from 1931 to 1930 and from 1933 to 1936.
