= Curt Sonney =

American politician

Member of the Pennsylvania House of Representatives from the 4th district
- In office January 4, 2005 – November 30, 2022
- Preceded by: Thomas J. Scrimenti
- Succeeded by: Jake Banta

Personal details
- Born: July 31, 1957 (age 68) Erie, Pennsylvania, U.S.
- Party: Republican
- Spouse: Cathy
- Children: 3

Curtis G. Sonney (born July 31, 1957) is an American politician. A Republican, he served as a member of the Pennsylvania House of Representatives for the 4th District from 2005 through 2022.

== Early life ==
Sonney was born on July 31, 1957, in Erie, Pennsylvania. He graduated from Harbor Creek High School in 1975.

== Political career ==
In the 2004 election, Sonney, a maintenance worker, challenged eight-term Representative Thomas J. Scrimenti to represent the 4th District in the Pennsylvania House of Representatives. He defeated the incumbent by 184 votes, running on a platform focused on healthcare and tax reform. He was re-elected continuously until retiring in 2022.

From 2019 until his retirement, Sonney chaired the House Education Committee. In that role Sonney supported the reduction of cyber charter school costs placed on school districts. He previously introduced on multiple occasions legislation that would have required parents to pay for their child's cyber charter school tuition. In 2019, Sonney introduced a bill to require school districts to have a cyber schooling option.
