= Robert Kusse =

American politician

Robert J. Kusse

Member of the Pennsylvania Senate from the 25th district
- In office June 7, 1977 – November 30, 1984
- Preceded by: Richard Frame
- Succeeded by: John Peterson

Member of the Pennsylvania House of Representatives from the 65th district
- In office January 2, 1973 – June 7, 1977
- Preceded by: William Allen
- Succeeded by: John Peterson

Personal details
- Born: March 19, 1918 Warren, Pennsylvania
- Died: February 8, 2008 (aged 89)

Robert J. Kusse (March 19, 1918 – February 8, 2008) was an American politician who served in the Pennsylvania State Senate from 1977 to 1984. He also served in the Pennsylvania House of Representatives.
