= John Peterson (Pennsylvania politician) =

American politician (born 1938)

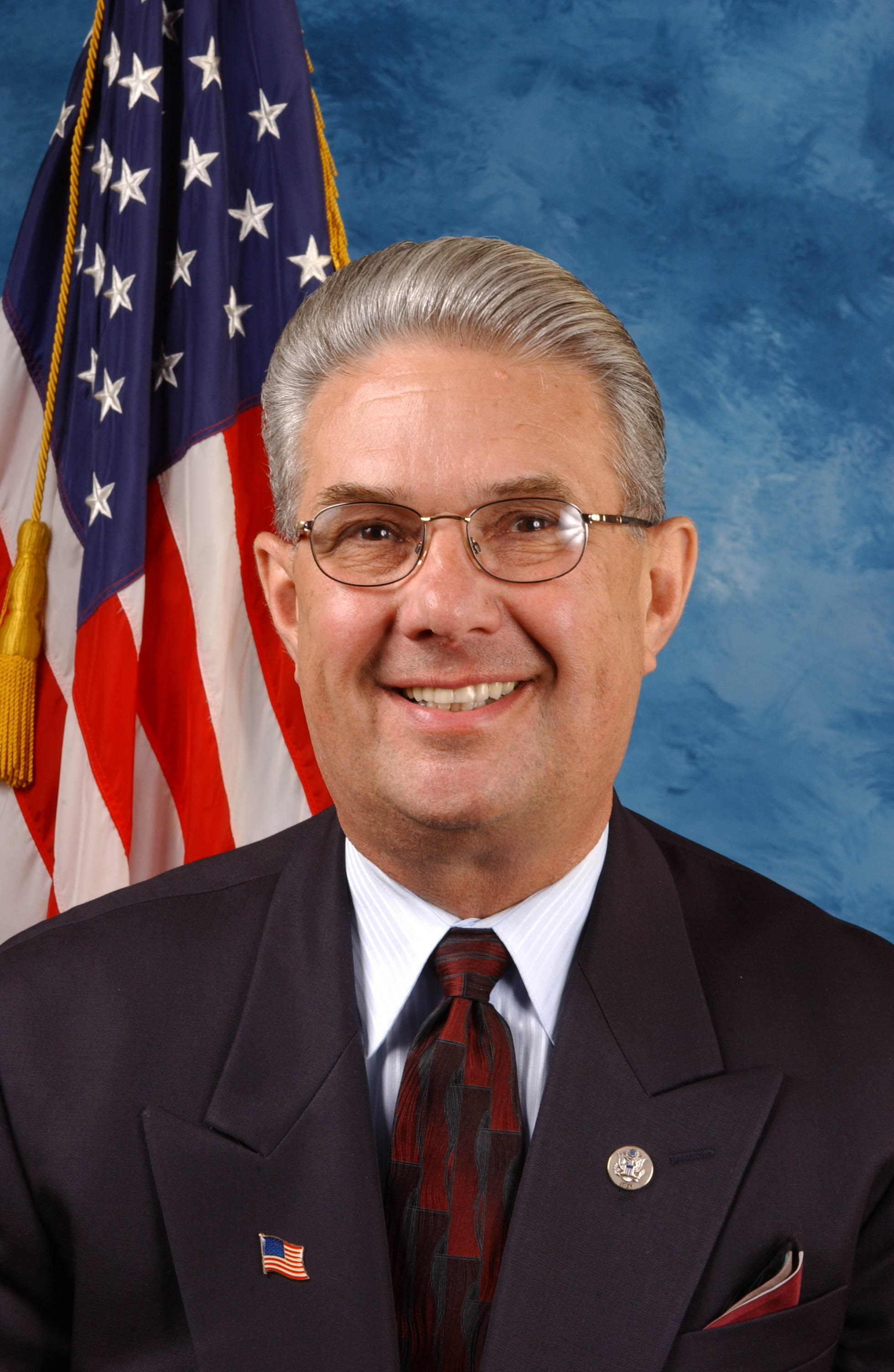

Member of the U.S. House of Representatives from Pennsylvania's 5th district
- In office January 3, 1997 – January 3, 2009
- Preceded by: Bill Clinger
- Succeeded by: Glenn Thompson

Member of the Pennsylvania Senate from the 25th district
- In office January 1, 1985 – November 30, 1996
- Preceded by: Robert Kusse
- Succeeded by: Bill Slocum

Member of the Pennsylvania House of Representatives from the 65th district
- In office November 8, 1977 – November 30, 1984
- Preceded by: Robert Kusse
- Succeeded by: Curt Bowley

Personal details
- Born: December 25, 1938 (age 87) Titusville, Pennsylvania, U.S.
- Party: Republican
- Spouse: Sandy Peterson
- Education: Pennsylvania State University

Military service
- Branch/service: United States Army
- Years of service: 1957–1963
- Rank: Specialist (second class)

John E. Peterson (born December 25, 1938) is an American Republican politician from the Commonwealth of Pennsylvania. Serving six terms from 1997 to 2009, he represented the state's mainly rural and largely Republican 5th congressional district in the U.S. House.

== Biography ==
John Peterson was born in Titusville, Pennsylvania on December 25, 1938. He served in the Army, both active and reserve duty, from 1957 through 1963. Following his honorable discharge as a Specialist, Peterson owned and operated a retail food market in his hometown of Pleasantville for 26 years. Peterson also completed a 3-year Rural Leadership Program through Penn State University.

=== Early political career ===
Peterson's first public office was on his local borough council, where he served for eight years. He was first elected to the Pennsylvania House of Representatives on November 8, 1977 In 1984, Peterson was elected to the Pennsylvania Senate where he served for 12 years, chairing both the Public Health and Welfare Committee and the Republican Policy Committee. While in the legislature, Peterson authored the Welfare Reform, Living Will, and AIDS Confidentiality legislation. He also created five Higher Education Councils in his district which enable students from rural areas to earn university degrees right in their own community.

=== Congress ===
In 1996, Peterson was elected to serve Pennsylvania's Fifth Congressional District in the U.S. House of Representatives. As a freshman Member of the Education and Workforce Committee, Peterson served on conference committees that made higher education more accessible to all Americans and improved the delivery system for technical education.

Peterson was appointed to the House Appropriations Committee in 1998, where he was a member of the Subcommittee on Labor, Health and Human Services and Education, the Subcommittee on the Interior and Environment as well as the Subcommittee on Homeland Security.

Peterson also served as co-chair of the Congressional Rural Caucus, a bipartisan coalition of more than 140 Members of Congress committed to strengthening and revitalizing rural communities across America. As the representative of Pennsylvania's largest, most rural district, Peterson was committed to strengthening job creation and economic development strategies; improving access to quality, affordable health care; expanding the availability of new technologies and technical education in rural areas; and enhancing the quality of life for his constituents.

In recognition of his support for rural economic development, Peterson was presented with the Congressional Partnership Award by the National Association of Development Organizations. Peterson was also named Policymaker of the Year by the Association for Career and Technical Education, and was honored by the National Rural Health Association as their 2002 Legislator of the Year for his efforts to improve Medicare funding for rural hospitals, nursing homes and other health care providers.

=== Awards and recognition ===
Peterson has been recognized by numerous other organizations including the National Association of Community Health Centers, the Pennsylvania Association of Home Health Agencies, the Seniors Coalition, the U.S. Chamber of Commerce, the National Association of Manufacturers, the National Federation of Independent Businesses, Americans for Tax Reform, the Association of Consulting Foresters, and the Pennsylvania Recreation and Parks Society.

=== Family ===
Peterson has been married to his wife, Saundra, for more than 30 years. They have a son and two granddaughters. Peterson is a Methodist.

== Environmental record ==
Peterson received the lowest possible environmental rating from the League of Conservation Voters in 2006, casting what the group qualified as anti-environment votes on twelve out of twelve critical issues ranging from oil drilling offshore and in the Arctic National Wildlife Refuge, salvage logging and logging roads, and the Clean Water Act, to the Toxics Release Inventory program and low-income energy assistance. The conservative environmental group Republicans for Environmental Protection singled out Peterson as "Worst in the House in 2006" on environmental issues. In addition to assigning the representative a score of zero for his voting record, REP censured him individually for "efforts to remove the moratorium on Outer Continental Shelf gas drilling through the Interior appropriations process." According to the League of Conservation Voters, "natural gas drilling can create massive amounts of water and air pollution and can leave open the possibility of oil spills, which would be toxic for a wide variety of marine and coastal life."

== Energy record ==
Peterson was among the most outspoken members of the U.S. House on increasing production of domestic energy, specifically natural gas. As a member of the Interior appropriations subcommittee, Peterson worked diligently to remove a 27-year-old moratorium on producing oil and gas on the Outer Continental Shelf (OCS). He has been referred to by President George W. Bush, who he has routinely taken on, as "Mr. Energy" and introduced the first energy production bill in the 110th House (2007–08)--the National Environment and Energy Development (NEED) Act, which is a natural gas production only bill.

On July 31, 2008, Peterson and Rep. Neil Abercrombie (D-Hawaii) introduced the first bipartisan energy production bill in the 110th Congress. The National Conservation, Environment and Energy Independence Act, H.R. 6709, would transform the environment, and according to its supporters, put America on the road to energy independence. While locking up the first 25 miles of coastline and giving states the option to lock up an additional 25 miles, this legislation would remove the congressional moratorium on offshore energy production and use the royalties gained from that production to develop next generation alternative and renewable energy sources.

== Retirement ==
In January 2008, Peterson announced he would be retiring from Congress at the end of his sixth term. Glenn Thompson, a Republican, won Peterson's seat in the 2008 elections.

U.S. House of Representatives
Preceded by Bill Clinger	Member of the U.S. House of Representatives from Pennsylvania's 5th congressional district 1997–2009	Succeeded by Glenn Thompson
U.S. order of precedence (ceremonial)
Preceded by James C. Greenwood as Former U.S. Representative	Order of precedence of the United States as Former U.S. Representative	Succeeded by Todd R. Platts as Former U.S. Representative
