= William W. Allen (politician) =

American politician (1908–1992)

Member of the Pennsylvania House of Representatives from the 65th district
- In office January 7, 1969 – November 30, 1972
- Preceded by: District Created
- Succeeded by: Robert J. Kusse

Member of the Pennsylvania House of Representatives from the Warren County district
- In office 1967–1968

Personal details
- Born: June 7, 1908 Dayton, Pennsylvania
- Died: June 20, 1992 (aged 84) Dundee, Florida
- Party: Republican

William W. Allen (June 7, 1908 – June 20, 1992) was a former Republican member of the Pennsylvania House of Representatives.
