= Tina Davis =

American politician

Tina M. Davis

Member of the Pennsylvania House of Representatives from the 141st district
- Incumbent
- Assumed office January 4, 2011
- Preceded by: Anthony Melio

Personal details
- Born: April 21, 1960 (age 66) Philadelphia, Pennsylvania, U.S
- Party: Democratic
- Spouse: Jim
- Children: 3
- Education: La Salle University (B.A.)

Tina M. Davis is a politician from the U.S. commonwealth of Pennsylvania. A member of the Democratic Party, she is a member of the Pennsylvania House of Representatives for the 141st district.

Davis currently sits on the Rules committee.
