= Kathy Rapp =

American politician

Kathy L. Rapp
- Rapp in 2008

Member of the Pennsylvania House of Representatives from the 65th district
- Incumbent
- Assumed office January 4, 2005
- Preceded by: Jim Lynch

Personal details
- Born: February 23, 1951 (age 75) Sligo, Pennsylvania, U.S.
- Party: Republican
- Children: 3
- Education: Slippery Rock State College
- Alma mater: Warren Area High School
- Website: www.reprapp.com

Kathy L. Rapp (born February 23, 1951) is an American politician and current Republican member of the Pennsylvania House of Representatives from the 65th District.

== Early life and education ==
Rapp was born on February 23, 1951, in Sligo, Pennsylvania. She graduated from Warren Area High School in 1969 and later attended Bryant & Stratton College. She earned her paralegal certification from Slippery Rock State College.

== Career ==
Prior to elective office, Rapp served as a community relations representative with Beverly Health Care in Warren, Pennsylvania. She volunteered for the Parent Education Network in York, Pennsylvania. She also worked as a compliance monitor with the Pennsylvania Department of Education, where she helped examine special education programs and served as a consultant with the Parent Education Network.

=== Pennsylvania House of Representatives ===
Rapp was first elected to the represent the 65th District in the Pennsylvania House of Representatives in 2004. She has since won re-election to nine more consecutive terms, many of which have been uncontested.

== Political positions ==
Rapp was "very much" opposed to legalizing medical cannabis in Pennsylvania, believing that it could open the door to full adult use cannabis legalization.

In 2020, Rapp was among 26 Pennsylvania House Republicans who called for the reversal of Joe Biden's certification as the winner of Pennsylvania's electoral votes in the 2020 United States presidential election, citing false claims of election irregularities.

She faced criticism in 2022 for refusing to support a bill that mandated patient-to-staff ratios for nurses in the state. She claimed that it would be "very irresponsible" to pass, and that she had not heard any real grievances about the issue.

== Personal life ==
Rapp lives in Warren, Pennsylvania. She has three children and seven grandchildren.
