= Forest Hopkins =

American politician

Forest W. Hopkins

Member of the Pennsylvania House of Representatives from the 4th district
- In office January 7, 1969 – April 27, 1978
- Preceded by: District Created
- Succeeded by: Harry Bowser

Member of the Pennsylvania House of Representatives from the Erie County district
- In office January 2, 1967 – November 30, 1968

Personal details
- Born: December 12, 1912
- Died: April 27, 1978 (aged 65)
- Party: Republican

Forest W. Hopkins (December 12, 1912 – April 27, 1978) was a Republican member of the Pennsylvania House of Representatives.
