= Curt Bowley =

American politician

Member of the Pennsylvania House of Representatives from the 65th district
- In office January 5, 1985 – November 30, 1992
- Preceded by: John Peterson
- Succeeded by: Jim Lynch

Personal details
- Born: August 10, 1954 (age 71) Warren, Pennsylvania, United States
- Party: Democratic

Curtis S. Bowley (born August 10, 1954) is a former Democratic member of the Pennsylvania House of Representatives.
