= Fort LeBoeuf School District =

School district in Pennsylvania

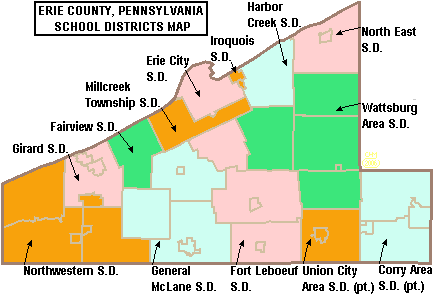
- Map of Erie County, Pennsylvania Public School Districts.

Address
- 931 N High St Waterford Waterford, Erie, Pennsylvania, 16441; United States

District information
- Type: Public
- Grades: K-12
- Superintendent: Mr. Richard Emerick

Students and staff
- Enrollment: 600
- District mascot: Bison
- Colors: Blue and White

Other information
- Website: www.fortleboeuf.net

The Fort LeBoeuf School District is a public school district serving parts of Erie County, Pennsylvania. It encompasses the communities Summit Township, Waterford, Waterford Township, LeBoeuf Township and Mill Village. It contains five schools:

Waterford Elementary
Robison Elementary
Mill Village Elementary
Fort LeBoeuf Middle
Fort LeBoeuf High School

There are currently more than 600 students attending the high school. After the fifth grade, all students from Mill Village, Waterford and Robison Elementary join in the middle school. Then, they continue to the high school, which is next to the middle school.

== Notable alumni ==
- 1983 - Jake Banta, politician and musician
- 1991 - Brian Milne, professional football player
- 2003 - Alaska Thunderfuck, drag queen
- 2008 – Matt Lynch, college basketball coach
- 2019 – Emily Yaple, professional soccer player
