= John Hornaman =

American politician

John R. Hornaman

Member of the Pennsylvania House of Representatives from the 3rd district
- In office January 2, 2007 – January 1, 2013
- Preceded by: Matthew W. Good
- Succeeded by: Ryan Bizzarro

Personal details
- Born: February 13, 1947 (age 79) Erie, Pennsylvania
- Party: Democratic
- Spouse: JoAnn Hornaman
- Education: Gannon University

Military service
- Allegiance: United States
- Branch/service: United States Army
- Years of service: 1970 — 1972
- Rank: First Lieutenant

John R. Hornaman (born February 13, 1947) is a former Democratic member of the Pennsylvania House of Representatives, representing the 3rd District from 2007 through 2013.

Hornaman attended McDowell High School and earned a degree in economics from Gannon University Prior to elective he worked as an agent for New York Life from 1972 through 1976. He also owned a painting contracting business, Creative Wall Finishes, for 30 years. He served as a citizen advisor on the Act 101 Solid Waste Committee of Erie County from 2005 to 2006. Hornaman has also been a strong advocate for Lake Erie Wind Power.
