= Jim Lynch (politician) =

American politician

James C. Lynch

Member of the Pennsylvania House of Representatives from the 65th district
- In office January 5, 1993 – November 30, 2004
- Preceded by: Curt Bowley
- Succeeded by: Kathy Rapp

Personal details
- Born: September 5, 1946 (age 80) Tidioute, Pennsylvania
- Party: Republican
- Spouse: Betty
- Children: 1 child
- Education: Youngstown State University

Military service
- Allegiance: United States
- Branch/service: United States Army
- Years of service: 1966—1969

James C. “Jim” Lynch (born September 5, 1946) is a former Republican member of the Pennsylvania House of Representatives.

== Biography ==
Lynch is a 1964 graduate of Sharon High School. He served in the U.S. Army from 1966 to 1969 and became a corporal. He earned a degree in business administration from Youngstown State University in 1973.

Lynch was first elected to represent the 65th legislative district in the Pennsylvania House of Representatives in 1992. During his career, Lynch introduced the law creating a dedicated funding stream for higher-education councils that help students in rural areas move from school to the workforce and the loan program to encourage the removal of leaky underground fuel storage tanks.

He retired prior to the 2004 election.
