= North East School District =

School district in Pennsylvania

The North East School District is a public school district serving parts of Erie County, Pennsylvania. It serves both North East Borough and North East Township. The district's four schools are contained in close proximity on a single campus, that also includes the administrative offices. Students in grades K-2 attend Earle C. Davis Primary School, those in grades 3-5 attend the intermediate elementary, those in grades 6-8 attend the middle school, and North East High School serves those in grades 9–12.
