= James J. A. Gallagher =

American politician (1927–1992)

Member of the Pennsylvania House of Representatives from the 141st district
- In office 1969–1986
- Preceded by: District created
- Succeeded by: Anthony Melio

Member of the Pennsylvania House of Representatives from the Bucks County district
- In office 1959–1968
- Preceded by: A. Patrick Brennan
- Succeeded by: New district

Personal details
- Born: James John Aloysious Gallagher; September 19, 1927 Philadelphia, Pennsylvania, U.S.
- Died: February 5, 1992 (aged 64) Bristol, Pennsylvania, U.S.
- Resting place: Resurrection Cemetery; Bensalem Township, Pennsylvania, U.S.
- Party: Democratic
- Spouse(s): Catherine; Dorothy Volas
- Occupation: Politician

James John Aloysious Gallagher (September 19, 1927 – February 5, 1992) was a Democratic member of the Pennsylvania House of Representatives.

== Early life ==
James John Aloysious Gallagher was born on September 19, 1927, in Philadelphia, Pennsylvania, to Mary E. (née Devlin) and James A. Gallagher. He graduated from La Salle College High School. He attended the Marine Corps Institute and St. Joseph's College of Industrial Relations.

== Career ==
Gallagher served in the United States Marine Corps from 1945 to 1946. He worked as a bus mechanic and was the owner and operator of Gallagher Tours. He also worked at Quinn Insurance.

Gallagher was chair of the Bristol Township School Authority from 1957 to 1964. He was a member of the Bucks County Democratic Executive Board. He was elected as a Democrat to the Pennsylvania House of Representatives in 1958, defeating incumbent A. Patrick Brennan. He was an alternate delegate to the 1964 Democratic National Convention. He served from 1959 to 1968, representing Bucks County, and continued serving, representing the 141st district, from 1969 to 1986. He was appointed to the legislative and budget and finance committee; serving from 1967 to 1974. He helped pass the Pennsylvania Higher Education Assistance Agency and served as its board chair from 1981 to 1986. He also served as chairman of the education committee for 20 years. He was appointed chair of the Selection Committee on Seasonal Farm Laborers and the Selection Committee to Investigate Limerick II in 1984. He ran for re-election to the Pennsylvania House in 1986, but was unsuccessful.

Gallagher was a member of the board of trustees in Bucks County Community College. He was an executive of Bristol Township from 1991 to 1992, first treasurer of the Bucks County Free Library and director of the Livengrin Foundation.

== Personal life ==
Gallagher married Catherine. He later married Dorothy Volas. He had one son and three daughters, James J.A. Jr., Sharon, Sheila and Kathleen M. He moved to Levittown in the 1950s. He also had another son, Sean. He was a communicant of St. Michael the Archangel Catholic Church in Levittown.

Gallagher had cancer of the jaw. In 1986, he had a portion of his jaw removed and in November 1991, he had reconstructive surgery. He died on February 5, 1992, at the Lower Bucks Hospital in Bristol, Pennsylvania. He was interred at Resurrection Cemetery in Bensalem Township.

== Awards ==
Gallagher was awarded an honorary Doctor of Education degree from Temple University in 1986. He received Democrat of the Year in Bucks County in 1991.
