= David C. DiCarlo =

American politician

Member of the Pennsylvania House of Representatives from the 3rd district
- In office January 4, 1973 – November 30, 1980
- Preceded by: Wendell R. Good
- Succeeded by: Karl Boyes

Personal details
- Born: September 21, 1945 (age 80) Erie, Pennsylvania
- Party: Democratic
- Children: Mikaele Majeroni, Erin Dicarlo, David J Dicarlo

David C. DiCarlo (born September 21, 1945) is a former Democratic member of the Pennsylvania House of Representatives.
