= Bob Brinker =

American talk radio host (1941–2024)

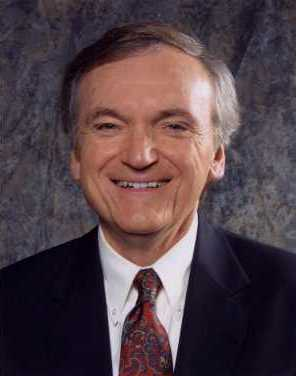
- Born: Robert John Brinker; October 1, 1941; Philadelphia, Pennsylvania, U.S.
- Died: August 18, 2024 (aged 82)
- Education: La Salle University
- Occupations: Financial advisor and radio host
- Website: www.bobbrinker.com

Robert John Brinker (October 1, 1941 – August 18, 2024) was an American financial advisor and radio host. From 1986 to 2018, Brinker hosted the syndicated financial radio show Moneytalk. He previously had a show on local New York radio on WMCA. Prior to that Brinker hosted talk radio programs on WCAU (now WPHT) and WWDB in Philadelphia.

== Early life and career ==
Born in Philadelphia on October 1, 1941, Brinker graduated from La Salle College High School. In 1964, Brinker graduated from La Salle University with a B.A. in economics. He then did master's degree studies in communications and finance at Temple University and became a news anchor with Philadelphia news radio station KYW in 1966.

== Financial career ==
In 1970, Brinker joined Provident National Bank as a portfolio manager. In 1973, Brinker became an investment officer with New Jersey National Bank. While working in New Jersey, Brinker was the adjunct professor of finance at Rider College in Lawrenceville, New Jersey. Brinker was a vice president and investment counselor with the Bank of New York from 1974 to 1981. Then from 1981 to 1992, Brinker was U.S. chief investment officer with the London-based British firm Guardian Royal Exchange Assurance. He was a member of the CFA Institute and the CFA Society New York.

== Radio career ==
During the late 1970s, Brinker hosted weekend talk shows on WCAU and WWDB in Philadelphia. Brinker also became the play-by-play radio voice for La Salle and Villanova college basketball.

Inkscape reproduction of Bob Brinker's Marketimer newsletter header

In 1981, New York City radio station WMCA hired Brinker to host an investment talk show. ABC Radio launched Brinker's nationally syndicated program Moneytalk in 1986. The show was heard on over 200 radio stations nationwide and was also streamed worldwide on the internet. Brinker began publishing the Marketimer newsletter in 1986. Marketimer covers market timing, the Federal Reserve, and mutual funds among other topics. Marketimer was listed on the Hulbert Financial Digest Investment Letter Honor Roll. Moneytalk aired on Sundays from 4 to 7 p.m. (Eastern Time).

In 2014, talkers.com named Brinker to its list of the 100 most important radio talk show hosts of all time. He was a member of the Screen Actors Guild American Federation of Television & Radio Artists.

After more than 32 years of hosting nationally syndicated MoneyTalk, Bob Brinker decided to step away from radio. The last live broadcast of the program was on September 30, 2018. The final edition of the Marketimer newsletter was published in June 2023. In mid-June, newsletter recipients received a letter saying that the newsletter was ending publication following 450 monthly editions beginning in January 1986.

== Personal life and death ==
Brinker lived in Henderson, Nevada. He was married and had three grown children. Brinker has also lived in Cocoa Beach, Florida.

Brinker died on August 18, 2024, at the age of 82.
