= Pennsylvania House of Representatives, District 65 =

American legislative district

Pennsylvania's 65th State House of Representatives district
Representative
Kathy Rapp; R–Warren
- Population (2022): 61,937

The 65th Pennsylvania House of Representatives District is located in northwest Pennsylvania and has been represented by Kathy Rapp since 2005.

== District Profile ==
The 65th District encompasses all of Forest County and Warren County, and includes the following areas of Crawford County:

- Athens Township
- Bloomfield Township
- Blooming Valley
- Cambridge Springs
- Cambridge Township
- Centerville
- Cussewago Township
- Richmond Township
- Rockdale Township
- Saegertown
- Spartansburg
- Sparta Township
- Venango
- Venango Township
- Woodcock
- Woodcock Township

== Representatives ==
Representative	Party	Years	District home	Note
Before 1969, seats were apportioned by county.
William W. Allen	Republican	1969 – 1972		
Robert J. Kusse	Republican	1973 – 1977		Resigned on June 7, 1977, after election to the Pennsylvania State Senate
John E. Peterson	Republican	1977 – 1984		Elected on November 8, 1977, to fill vacancy
Curt Bowley	Democrat	1985 – 1992		
Jim Lynch	Republican	1993 – 2004		
Kathy Rapp	Republican	2005 – present	Warren	Incumbent

== Recent election results ==
PA House election, 2024: Pennsylvania House, District 65
Party	Candidate	Votes	%
Republican	Kathy Rapp (incumbent)	23,155	72.96
Democratic	Erin Willman	8,581	27.04
Total votes		31,736	100.00
Republican hold			

PA House election, 2022: Pennsylvania House, District 65
Party	Candidate	Votes	%
Republican	Kathy Rapp (incumbent)	Unopposed	
Total votes		20,203	100.00
Republican hold			

PA House election, 2020: Pennsylvania House, District 65
Party	Candidate	Votes	%
Republican	Kathy Rapp (incumbent)	Unopposed	
Total votes		25,343	100.00
Republican hold			

PA House election, 2018: Pennsylvania House, District 65
Party	Candidate	Votes	%
Republican	Kathy Rapp (incumbent)	Unopposed	
Total votes		16,259	100.00
Republican hold			

PA House election, 2016: Pennsylvania House, District 65
Party	Candidate	Votes	%
Republican	Kathy Rapp (incumbent)	18,248	69.97
Democratic	Troy Clawson	7,830	30.03
Total votes		26,078	100.00
Republican hold			
