= Anthony Melio =

American politician (1932–2012)

Anthony Joseph Melio

Member of the Pennsylvania House of Representatives from the 141st district
- In office January 6, 1987 – November 30, 2010
- Preceded by: James J. A. Gallagher
- Succeeded by: Tina Davis

Personal details
- Born: May 13, 1932 Trenton, New Jersey, US
- Died: July 19, 2012 (aged 80) Philadelphia, Pennsylvania, US
- Party: Democratic
- Spouse: Anna May Muha

Military service
- Branch/service: United States Navy Reserve
- Years of service: 1949–1959

Anthony Joseph Melio (May 13, 1932 – July 19, 2012) was a Democratic member of the Pennsylvania House of Representatives for the 141st District.

== Early life and education ==
Melio was born in Trenton, New Jersey, and attended Trenton Central High School. He served in the United States Navy Reserves from 1949 to 1959.

== Legislative career ==
Melio was elected to the Pennsylvania House of Representatives in 1986. He retired at the end of the legislative session on November 30, 2010.

== Illness and death ==
Melio died in Philadelphia, Pennsylvania at the age of eighty on July 19, 2012, from complications related to an appendectomy.
