= Pennsylvania House of Representatives, District 3 =

American legislative district

Coordinates: 42.042°N 80.079°W

Pennsylvania's 3rd State House of Representatives district
Representative
Ryan Bizzarro; D–Millcreek Township, Erie County
- Population (2022): 65,250

The 3rd Pennsylvania House of Representatives District is located in northwest Pennsylvania, and has been represented by Ryan Bizzarro since 2013.

== District profile ==
The 3rd Pennsylvania House of Representatives District is located in Erie County and includes the following areas:

- Fairview Township
- Millcreek Township

== Representatives ==
Representative	Party	Years	District home	Notes
Before 1969, seats were apportioned by county.
Wendell Good	Republican	1969 – 1972	Erie	Defeated in general election.
David C. DiCarlo	Democrat	1973 – 1980	Erie	Did not run for re-election.
Karl Boyes	Republican	1981 – 2003	Erie	Died in office on May 11.
Matthew W. Good	Republican	2003 – 2006	Millcreek Township	Elected in special election on July 22. Defeated in general election.
John Hornaman	Democrat	2007 – 2012	Millcreek Township	Did not run for re-election.
Ryan Bizzarro	Democrat	2013 – present	Millcreek Township	Incumbent

== Recent election results ==
PA House election, 2024: Pennsylvania House, District 3
Party	Candidate	Votes	%
Democratic	Ryan Bizzarro (incumbent)	21,637	57.55
Republican	Micah Goring	15,957	42.45
Total votes		37,594	100.00
Democratic hold			

PA House election, 2022: Pennsylvania House, District 3
Party	Candidate	Votes	%
Democratic	Ryan Bizzarro (incumbent)	19,934	64.07
Republican	Joseph S. Kujawa	11,179	35.93
Total votes		31,113	100.00
Democratic hold			

2020 PA House election: Pennsylvania House, District 3
Party	Candidate	Votes	%	±%
Democratic	Ryan Bizzarro (incumbent)	22,219	61.37	−38.63
Republican	Greg Hayes	13,985	38.63	+38.63
Margin of victory		8,234	22.74	▼22.74
Turnout		36,204	100	

2018 PA House election: Pennsylvania House, District 3
Party	Candidate	Votes	%	±%
Democratic	Ryan Bizzarro (incumbent)	20,265	100	+40.06
Turnout		20,265	100	

2016 PA House election: Pennsylvania House, District 3
Party	Candidate	Votes	%	±%
Democratic	Ryan Bizzarro (incumbent)	19,595	59.94	−4.77
Republican	Gregory Lucas	13,094	40.06	+4.77
Margin of victory		6,501	14.88	▼14.54
Turnout		32,689	100	

2014 PA House election: Pennsylvania House, District 3
Party	Candidate	Votes	%	±%
Democratic	Ryan Bizzarro (incumbent)	13,155	64.71	+11.44
Republican	Luke Lofgren	7,175	35.29	−11.44
Margin of victory		5,980	29.42	▲22.88
Turnout		20,330	100	

2012 PA House election: Pennsylvania House, District 3
Party	Candidate	Votes	%	±%
Democratic	Ryan Bizzarro	16,198	53.27	−0.23
Republican	Jason Owen	14,208	46.73	+0.23
Margin of victory		1,990	6.54	▼0.46
Turnout		30,406	100	

2010 PA House election: Pennsylvania House, District 3
Party	Candidate	Votes	%	±%
Democratic	John Hornaman (incumbent)	12,483	53.5	−3.68
Republican	Regina Smith	10,849	46.5	+3.68
Margin of victory		1,634	7	▼7.36
Turnout		23,332	100	

== Sources ==
- Trostle, Sharon, ed. (2009). The Pennsylvania Manual. Vol. 119. Harrisburg: Pennsylvania Department of General Services. ISBN 0-8182-0334-X.
