= Karl Boyes =

American politician

Karl W. Boyes

Member of the Pennsylvania House of Representatives from the 3rd district
- In office January 6, 1981 – May 11, 2003
- Preceded by: David C. DiCarlo
- Succeeded by: Matthew W. Good

Personal details
- Born: March 1, 1936 Erie, Pennsylvania
- Died: May 11, 2003 (aged 67)
- Party: Republican
- Education: Edinboro State College

Karl W. Boyes (March 1, 1936 – May 11, 2003) was a Republican member of the Pennsylvania House of Representatives.

== Biography ==
He was a 1959 graduate of Edinboro State College and attended classes at Allegheny College and Union College. He was first elected to represent the 3rd legislative district in the Pennsylvania House of Representatives in 1980, a position he held until his death on May 11, 2003.

He was also a Millcreek Township Supervisor from 1966 until his being elected to the Pennsylvania House in 1980.

The Karl Boyes Multipurpose Trail is a 13.5-mile bike loop through Presque Isle State Park, Erie, Pennsylvania.

The $100,000 Karl Boyes Northwestern Pa. Memorial Stakes race at Presque Isle Downs is held each year in honor of the former house of representative.
