= Ryan Bizzarro =

American politician (born 1985)

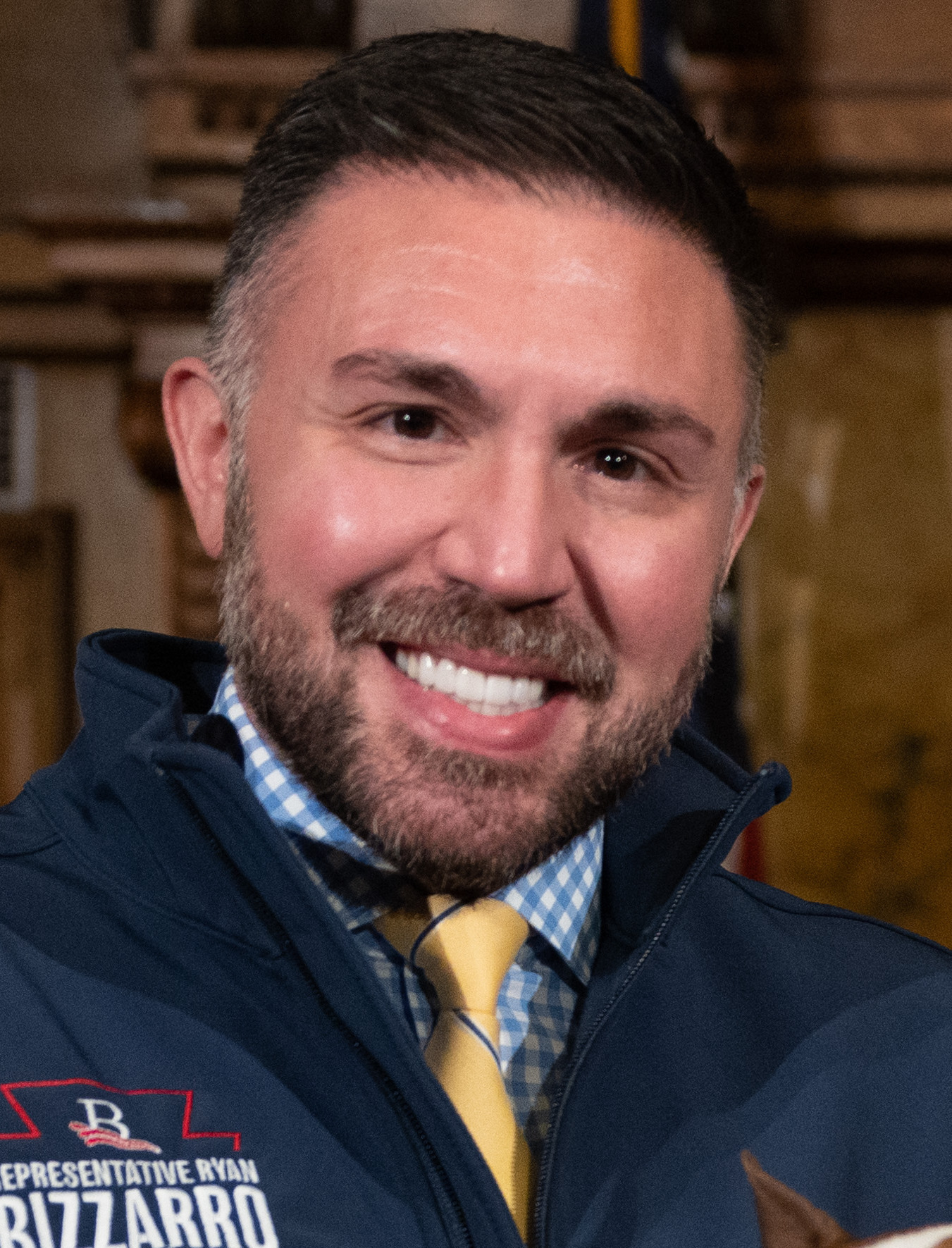

Member of the Pennsylvania House of Representatives from the 3rd district
- Incumbent
- Assumed office January 1, 2013
- Preceded by: John Hornaman

Personal details
- Born: November 13, 1985 (age 40) Erie, Pennsylvania, U.S.
- Party: Democratic
- Education: Edinboro University (BA); Gannon University (MBA)
- Website: State House website

Ryan A. Bizzarro (born November 13, 1985) is an American politician and member of the Pennsylvania House of Representatives. He has represented the 3rd district since January 2013. His district is located in Erie County and includes the townships of Millcreek and Fairview.

Bizzarro is a member of the Democratic Party and currently serves in House Democratic Leadership as the House Democratic Policy chairman. He was a candidate for Pennsylvania state treasurer in the 2024 election, but lost the primary to Erin McClelland.

== Early life and background ==
Bizzarro is a lifelong resident of Erie, Pennsylvania. A survivor of childhood leukemia, he attended McDowell High School, graduating in 2004.

In 2008, he graduated from Edinboro University with degrees in political science and criminal justice. He also received a master's degree from Gannon University in public administration.

He worked for the county as a victim/witness coordinator and as an advocate for the Office of the Erie County District Attorney and the Crime Victim Center. He also worked as a behavioral health specialist at McKinley Elementary School and in business development for the Erie County Convention Center Authority.

== State representative ==
Bizzarro was elected to the Pennsylvania House of Representatives in 2012, defeating Republican attorney Jason Owen. He was sworn in on January 1, 2013.

Bizzarro was elected to serve in House Democratic Leadership as the House Democratic Policy Committee Chairman for the 2021-22 Legislative Session. He was re-elected to chair the House Policy Committee in 2023-24. As chair, he oversaw the creation of the Subcommittee on Progressive Policies for Working People and the Subcommittee on Labor, Energy, and Development.

He also sits on the House Rules Committee; on the Climate Change Advisory Committee, which is tasked to establish and review Pennsylvania's official action plan to combat climate change; and on the Pennsylvania Grade Crude Development Advisory Council, examining existing technical regulations and policies for the oil and gas industry.

Bizzarro previously served as chief deputy House whip, vice chairman of the Northwest Delegation, vice chairman of the House Democratic Policy Committee, and Democratic secretary of the House Veterans Affairs & Emergency Preparedness Committee. He has been a member of the House Consumer Affairs, Insurance, and Judiciary committees, as well as the Judiciary Subcommittee on Courts.

== 2024 state treasurer campaign ==
On September 26, 2023, Bizzarro announced his candidacy for state treasurer in the 2024 election. He was considered the favorite to win the Democratic primary, receiving the endorsement of the Pennsylvania Democratic Party and numerous Democratic politicians, but lost in an upset to Erin McClelland.

== Legislation ==
Bizzarro authored Libre's Law, a state law addressing punishment for animal abuse. In 2017 – the year Libre's Law was signed into effect – Bizzarro was named National Legislator of the Year by the Humane Society of the United States (2016).

== Awards ==
Bizzarro has been recognized for his service by several groups and organizations locally and nationally. In 2025, the Pennsylvania NewsMedia Association inducted Bizzarro into its Hall of Fame and honored Bizzarro as Advocate of the Year for authoring and passage of anti-SLAPP legislation signed into law in 2024. Pennsylvania PBS honored Bizzarro with the Good Neighbor Award for being a Champion of Lifelong Learning in recognition of his support for public broadcasting. In 2022, City & State featured him on PA's PowerList as one of Pennsylvania's most influential "Forty Under 40." In 2020, the American Society of Clinical Oncology & Pennsylvania Society of Oncology and Hematology named him the Legislator of the Year. Other awards include being named one of the Erie Reader's "40 Under 40" (2013); Edinboro University's Honored Alumnus of the Year (2014); Humane Society Legislator of the Year (2016); Pennsylvania Snowmobile Association Legislator of the Year (2018); and Best of Erie's "Best Politician" in the years 2015, 2016 and 2017 (the category was removed in 2018).

== Personal life ==
Bizzarro's family is prominent in the boxing world.

He lives in Millcreek Township with his rescue dog, Boss.

On October 15, 2014, Bizzarro and Representative Marty Flynn were near the Pennsylvania State Capitol after having a late dinner when someone approached and demanded their wallets at gunpoint. Flynn reached for his concealed pistol and a spotter warned the assailant, leading to a shootout. No one was injured. Four teenagers were arrested.
