= Matthew W. Good =

American politician

Matthew Good

Member of the Pennsylvania House of Representatives from the 3rd district
- In office August 4, 2003 – November 30, 2006
- Preceded by: Karl Boyes
- Succeeded by: John Hornaman

Personal details
- Born: 1975 (age 50–51)
- Party: Republican
- Education: Gannon University

Matthew William Good is a former Republican member of the Pennsylvania House of Representatives, representing the 3rd District. He was first elected in a special election on July 22, 2003, to fill the remainder of Karl Boyes' term. He lost re-election in 2006 to Democrat John Hornaman.

Good attended Central Catholic High School and earned a degree in Political Science from Gannon University. Prior to elective office, he worked as chief of staff for Karl Boyes from 1997 to 2003.
