= Pennsylvania House of Representatives, District 141 =

American legislative district

Pennsylvania's 141st State House of Representatives district
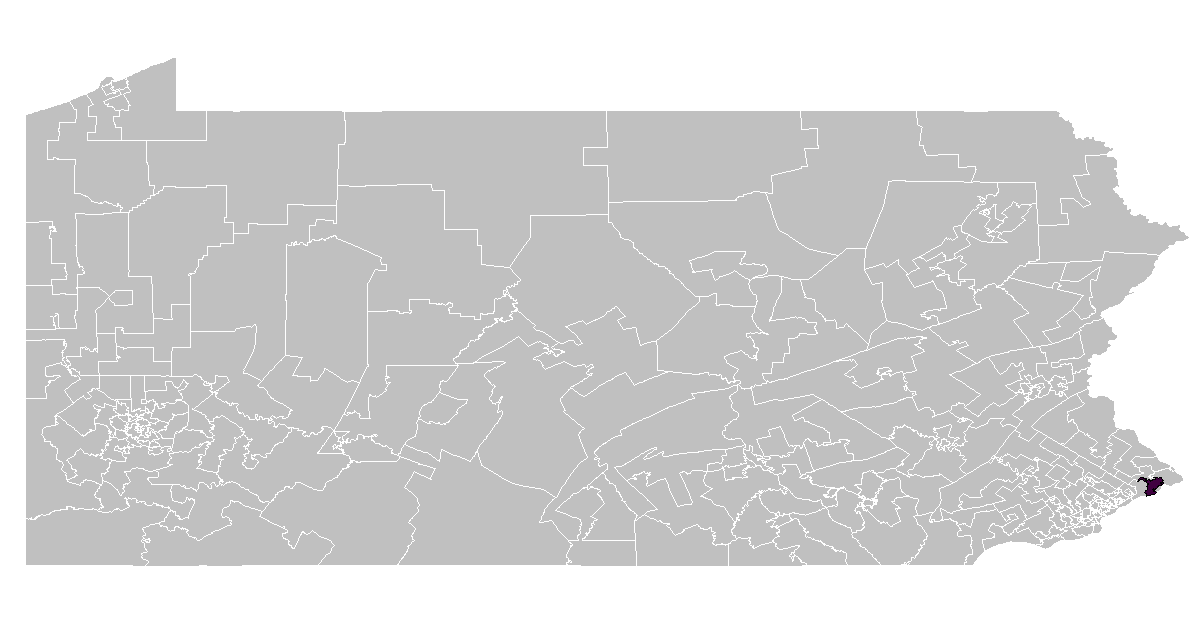
Representative
Tina Davis; D–Bristol Township
- Demographics: 81.5% White; 9.5% Black; 6.8% Hispanic
- Population (2011) • Citizens of voting age: 62,570; 48,290

The 141st Pennsylvania House of Representatives District is located in Southeastern Pennsylvania and has been represented since 2011 by Tina Davis.

== District profile ==
The 141st Pennsylvania House of Representatives District is located in Bucks County. It includes the Sesame Place. It is made up of the following areas:

- Bristol Township (PART)
  - Ward 01
  - Ward 02
  - Ward 03
  - Ward 04
  - Ward 05 [PART, Division 02]
  - Ward 06
  - Ward 07 [PART, Division 02]
  - Ward 08
  - Ward 09 [PART, Division 01]
  - Ward 10
  - Ward 11
- Hulmeville
- Middletown Township (PART)
  - District Lower [PART, Divisions 01, 03, 04, 06 and 13]
- Penndel

== Representatives ==
In January 2010, Tony Melio announced that he would not seek re-election, opening the seat to six hopefuls (3 Democrats and 3 Republicans). In November 2010, Tina Davis was elected to succeed Melio.

Representative	Party	Years	District home	Note
Before 1969, seats were apportioned by county.
James J. A. Gallagher	Democrat	1969–1986		
Anthony Melio	Democrat	1987–2010	Levittown	
Tina Davis	Democrat	2011–present		

== Recent election results ==
PA House election, 2010: Pennsylvania House, District 141
Party	Candidate	Votes	%	±%
Democratic	Tina Davis	8,809	51.07	
Republican	Kevin Glasson	8,440	48.93	
Margin of victory		369	2.14	
Turnout		17,249	100	

PA House election, 2012: Pennsylvania House, District 141
Party	Candidate	Votes	%	±%
Democratic	Tina Davis	17,630	72.55	
Republican	Anthony Sposato	6,671	27.45	
Margin of victory		10,959	45.10	▲42.96
Turnout		24,301	100	

PA House election, 2014: Pennsylvania House, District 141
Party	Candidate	Votes	%	±%
Democratic	Tina Davis	10,233	70.61	
Republican	Joseph Lippolis	4,260	29.39	
Margin of victory		5,973	41.22	▼3.88
Turnout		14,493	100	

PA House election, 2016: Pennsylvania House, District 141
Party	Candidate	Votes	%	±%
Democratic	Tina Davis	17,743	65.60	
Republican	Drew Kreiling	9,305	34.40	
Margin of victory		8,438	31.20	▼10.02
Turnout		27,048	100	
