= North East Township, Pennsylvania =

Township in Pennsylvania, US

Coordinates: 42°12′00″N 79°49′59″W

- Township
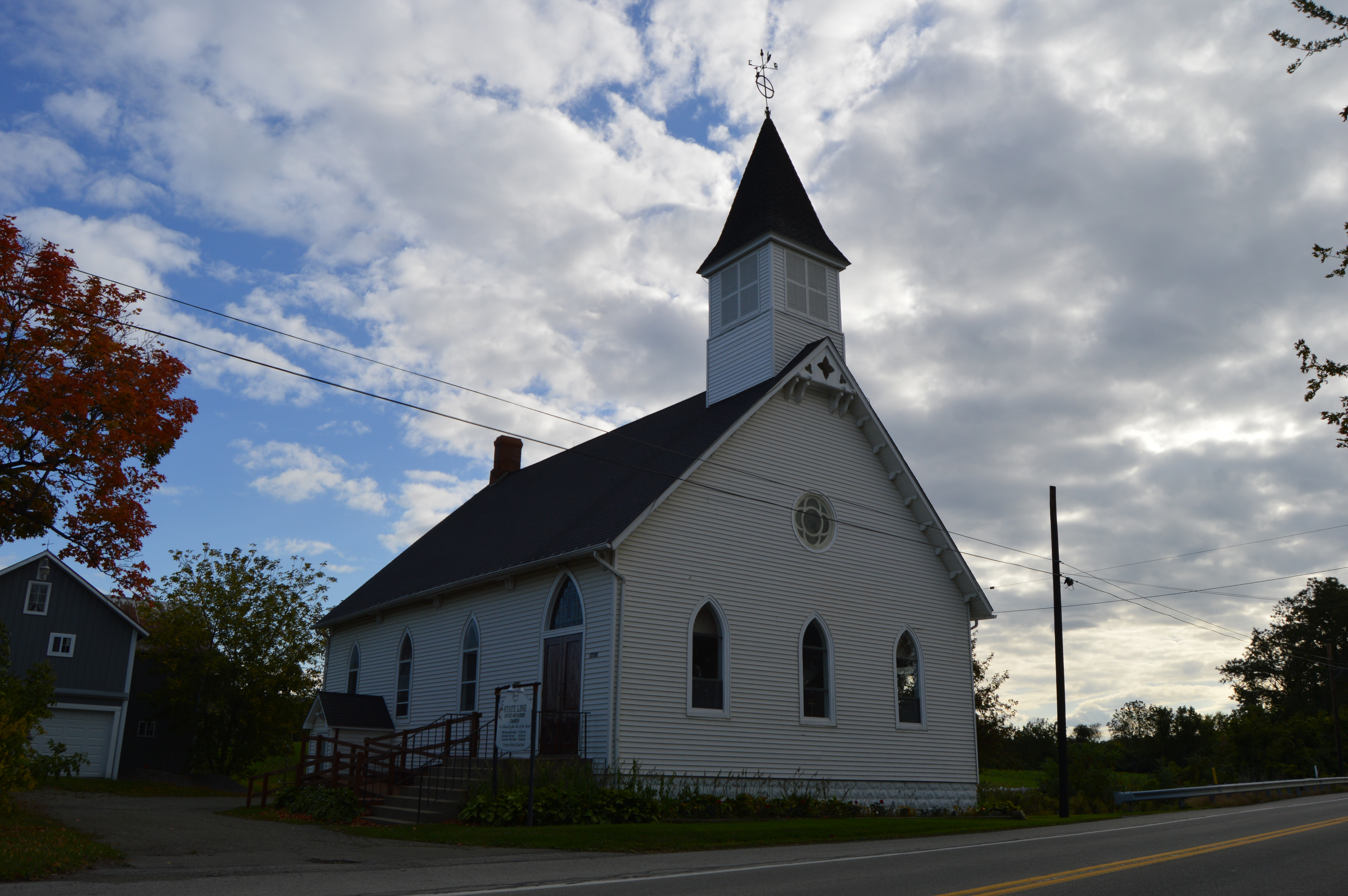
- State Line Methodist Church, located in Pennsylvania, as seen from New York
- Etymology: Its location in Erie County
- Location in Erie County and the U.S. state of Pennsylvania
- Country: United States
- State: Pennsylvania
- County: Erie

Area
  - Total: 42.38 sq mi (109.77 km^{2})
  - Land: 42.14 sq mi (109.13 km^{2})
  - Water: 0.25 sq mi (0.64 km^{2})

Population (2020)
  - Total: 6,529
  - Estimate (2023): 6,439
  - Density: 148.8/sq mi (57.45/km^{2})
- Time zone: UTC-4 (EST)
  - Summer (DST): UTC-5 (EDT)
- Area code: 814
- FIPS code: 42-049-54960
- Website: northeasttwp.org

North East Township is a township in Erie County, Pennsylvania, United States. The population was 6,529 at the 2020 census, up from 6,315 at the 2010 census, down from 7,702 in 2000.

== Geography ==
The township is in the northeastern corner of Erie County and is adjacent to the New York state line. Lake Erie borders the northern edge of the township. The township surrounds the borough of North East, a separate municipality. According to the United States Census Bureau, the township has a total area of 42.4 square miles (109.8 km^{2}), of which 42.2 square miles (109.2 km^{2}) is land and 0.23 square miles (0.6 km^{2}), or 0.56%, is water.

North East Township contains Pennsylvania's northernmost point.

== Demographics ==
Historical population
Census	Pop.	Note	%±
2000	7,702		—
2010	6,315		−18.0%
2020	6,529		3.4%
2023 (est.)	6,439		−1.4%
U.S. Decennial Census

As of the census of 2000, there were 7,702 people, 2,485 households, and 1,861 families residing in the township. The population density was 181.8 inhabitants per square mile (70.2/km^{2}). There were 2,691 housing units at an average density of 63.5 per square mile (24.5/km^{2}). The racial makeup of the township was 97.83% White, 0.88% African American, 0.03% Native American, 0.43% Asian, 0.03% Pacific Islander, 0.25% from other races, and 0.56% from two or more races. Hispanic or Latino of any race were 0.82% of the population.

There were 2,485 households, out of which 34.7% had children under the age of 18 living with them, 64.3% were married couples living together, 7.6% had a female householder with no husband present, and 25.1% were non-families. 21.5% of all households were made up of individuals, and 9.6% had someone living alone who was 65 years of age or older. The average household size was 2.65 and the average family size was 3.10.

In the township the population was spread out, with 23.7% under the age of 18, 19.4% from 18 to 24, 23.8% from 25 to 44, 21.5% from 45 to 64, and 11.6% who were 65 years of age or older. The median age was 33 years. For every 100 females there were 102.0 males. For every 100 females age 18 and over, there were 102.4 males.

The median income for a household in the township was $42,696, and the median income for a family was $51,056. Males had a median income of $37,773 versus $25,707 for females. The per capita income for the township was $16,516. About 3.6% of families and 5.8% of the population were below the poverty line, including 7.0% of those under age 18 and 2.8% of those age 65 or over.

== Education ==
Local schools are organized by the North East School District.
