= Waterford, Pennsylvania =

Borough in Pennsylvania, US

Waterford
- Borough
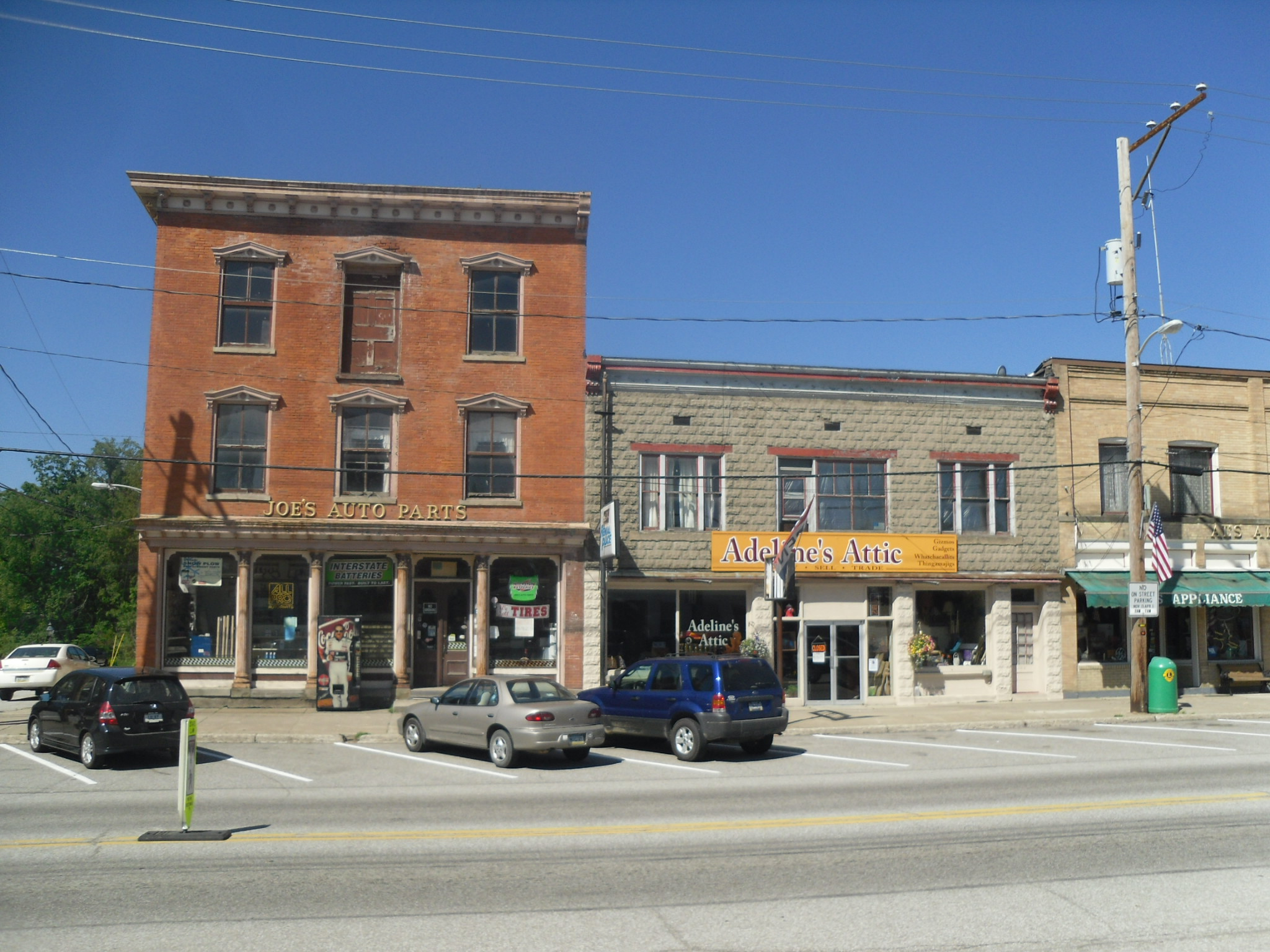
- Downtown Waterford

- Location in Erie County and the U.S. state of Pennsylvania.
- Coordinates: 41°56′37″N 79°59′2″W
- Country: United States
- State: Pennsylvania
- County: Erie

Area
  - Total: 1.24 sq mi (3.21 km^{2})
  - Land: 1.22 sq mi (3.17 km^{2})
  - Water: 0.015 sq mi (0.04 km^{2})
- Elevation (Borough benchmark): 1,207 ft (368 m)
- Highest elevation (northwest corner of borough): 1,330 ft (410 m)
- Lowest elevation (Trout Run): 1,166 ft (355 m)

Population (2020)
  - Total: 1,475 ▼
  - Estimate (2021): 1,464
  - Density: 1,219.9/sq mi (470.99/km^{2})
- Time zone: UTC-4 (EST)
  - Summer (DST): UTC-5 (EDT)
- ZIP code: 16441
- Area code: 814
- FIPS code: 42-81456
- Website: waterfordboro.net

Waterford is a borough in Erie County, Pennsylvania, United States. The population was 1,475 at the 2020 census. It is part of the Erie Metropolitan Statistical Area. Waterford is named after County Waterford in Ireland.

Waterford is an independent municipality located entirely within (and surrounded by) Waterford Township and is located near the geographic center of the township.

== Geography ==
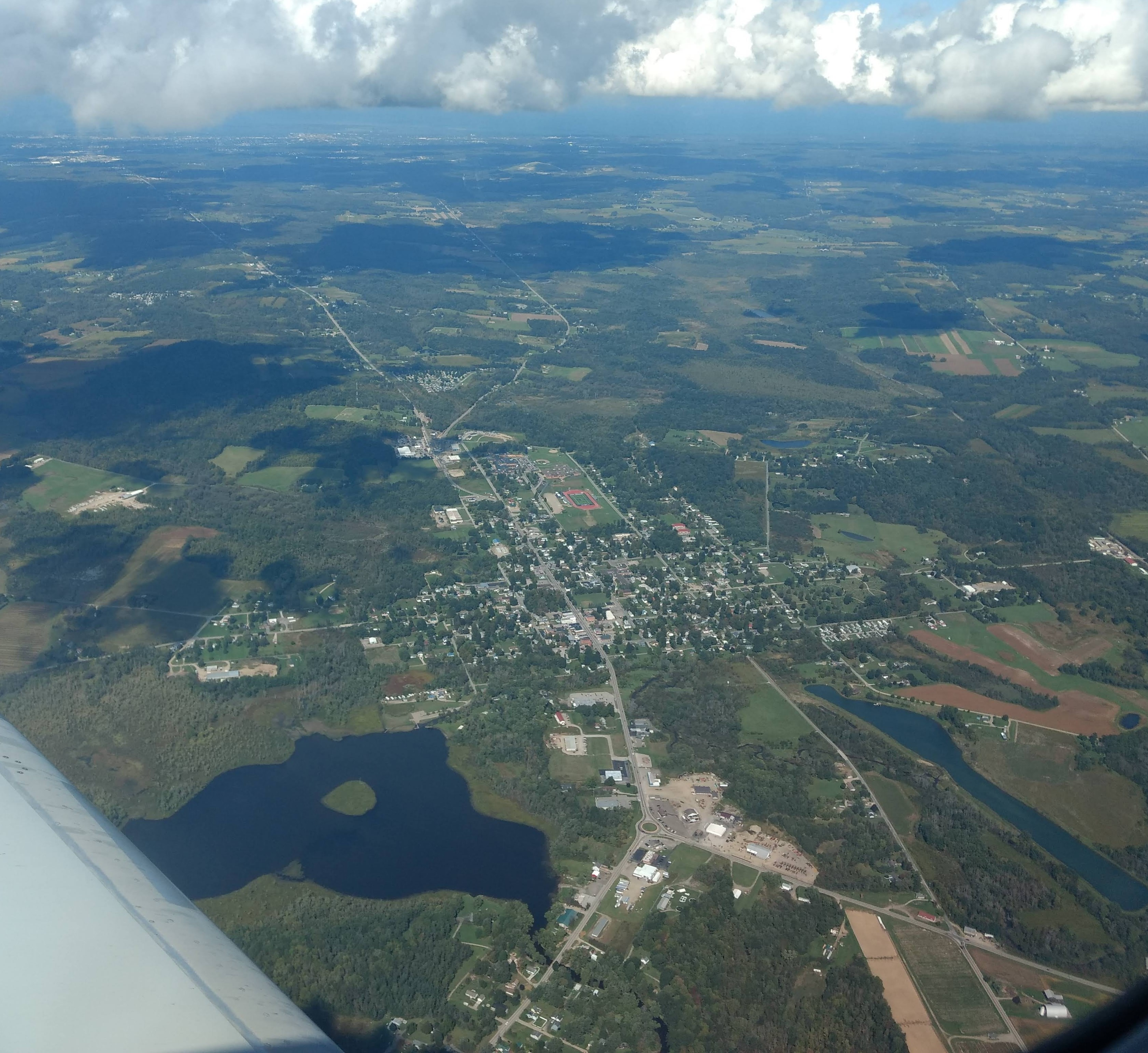
Aerial view of Waterford

Waterford is located southeast of the center of Erie County at 41°56′37″N 79°59′2″W (41.943648, -79.984012). U.S. Route 19 and Pennsylvania Route 97 pass through the borough center as High Street. US 19 leads north 15 miles (24 km) to downtown Erie and south to Meadville, while PA 97 leads north 14.5 miles (23.3 km) to Erie by a more easterly route and southeast 8 miles (13 km) to Union City.

According to the United States Census Bureau, Waterford borough has a total area of 1.2 square miles (3.2 km^{2}), of which 0.02 square miles (0.04 km^{2}), or 1.18%, is water. Lake LeBoeuf lies immediately south of the borough and is part of the French Creek watershed, draining south to the Allegheny River.

== Demographics ==
Historical population
Census	Pop.	Note	%±
1840	403		—
1850	498		23.6%
1860	792		59.0%
1870	790		−0.3%
1880	784		−0.8%
1890	838		6.9%
1900	767		−8.5%
1910	724		−5.6%
1920	744		2.8%
1930	769		3.4%
1940	804		4.6%
1950	1,195		48.6%
1960	1,390		16.3%
1970	1,468		5.6%
1980	1,568		6.8%
1990	1,492		−4.8%
2000	1,449		−2.9%
2010	1,517		4.7%
2020	1,476		−2.7%
2021 (est.)	1,464	▼	−0.8%

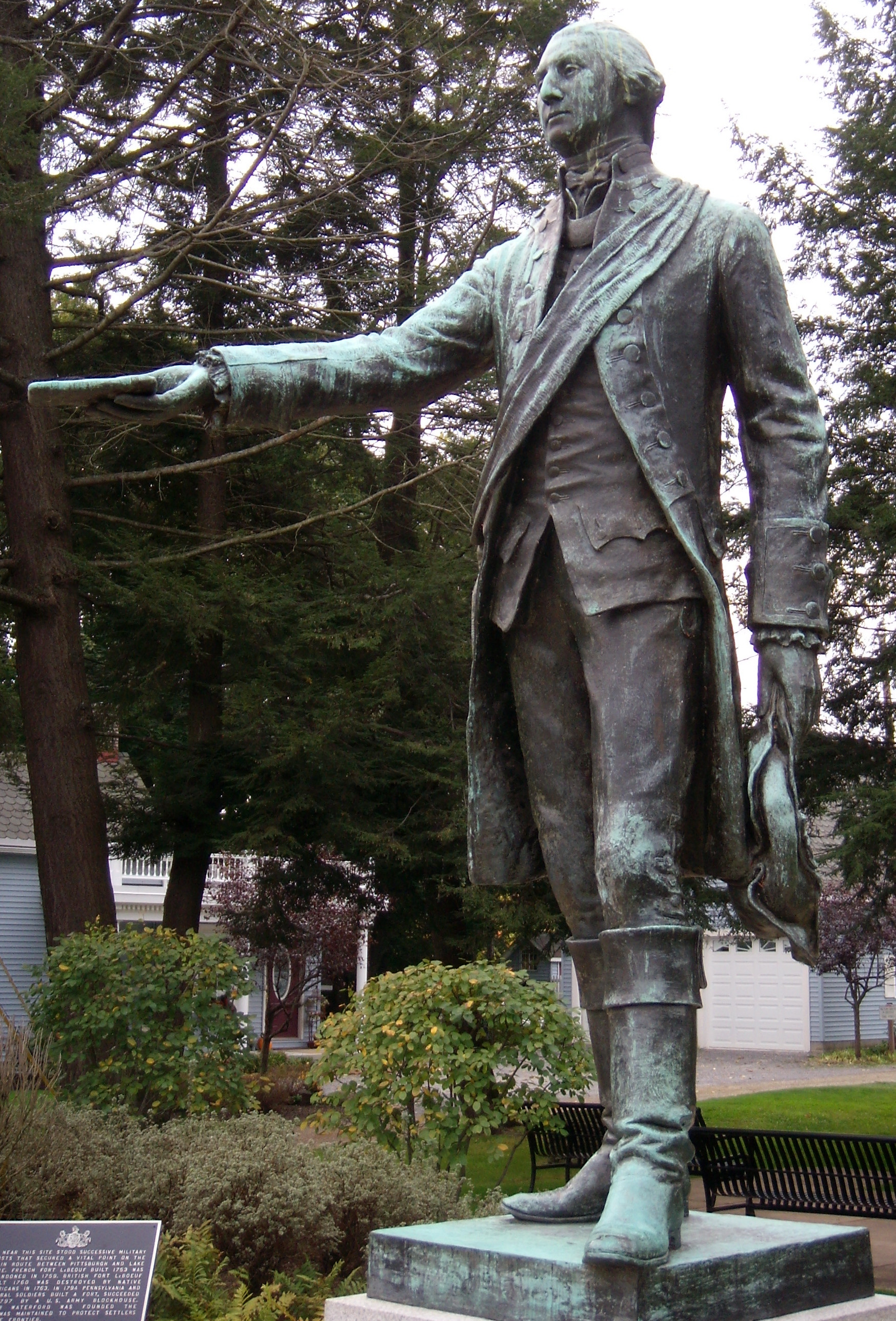
A statue of George Washington wearing the uniform of the Virginia militia.

As of the census of 2000, there were 1,449 people, 558 households, and 409 families residing in the borough. The population density was 1,189.3 inhabitants per square mile (459.2/km^{2}). There were 590 housing units at an average density of 484.3 per square mile (187.0/km^{2}). The racial makeup of the borough was 98.76% White, 0.28% African American, 0.21% Native American, 0.07% Asian, 0.14% from other races, and 0.55% from two or more races. Hispanic or Latino of any race were 0.48% of the population.

There were 558 households, out of which 35.7% had children under the age of 18 living with them, 57.7% were married couples living together, 12.5% had a female householder with no husband present, and 26.7% were non-families. 21.7% of all households were made up of individuals, and 10.6% had someone living alone who was 65 years of age or older. The average household size was 2.60 and the average family size was 3.01.

In the borough the population was spread out, with 27.1% under the age of 18, 8.6% from 18 to 24, 27.9% from 25 to 44, 23.0% from 45 to 64, and 13.4% who were 65 years of age or older. The median age was 36 years. For every 100 females there were 91.2 males. For every 100 females age 18 and over, there were 85.6 males.

The median income for a household in the borough was $37,875, and the median income for a family was $40,368. Males had a median income of $32,946 versus $21,202 for females. The per capita income for the borough was $17,135. About 4.5% of families and 7.2% of the population were below the poverty line, including 8.2% of those under age 18 and 4.0% of those age 65 or over.

== History ==
Waterford is said to contain the only statue of George Washington wearing a British uniform, but in reality, he had been sent by the Governor of Virginia and is wearing the uniform of an officer in the Virginia Militia. In December 1753, at age 21, Washington was asked by Governor Dinwiddie to carry a British ultimatum to the French on the Ohio frontier. Washington delivered the message at Fort Le Boeuf in present-day Waterford. The message, which went unheeded because he delivered it to the wrong person, called for the French to abandon their development of the Ohio Country to the south. The two colonial powers were heading toward worldwide conflict, the Seven Years' War, known as the French and Indian War in North America.

The area roughly bounded by North Park Row, High Street, West First Street, and Walnut Street comprises the Waterford Borough Historic District. The Eagle Hotel and Waterford Covered Bridge, along with the Waterford Borough Historic District are all listed on the National Register of Historic Places.

== Notable people ==
- Frank A. Green, farmer and Minnesota state legislator
- Brian Milne, professional football player, Cincinnati Bengals, Seattle Seahawks, New Orleans Saints
- Pat Monahan, singer-songwriter, lead singer of Train
- Claude AnShin Thomas, Zen Buddhist mendicant monk, decorated Vietnam War veteran, writer
- Strong Vincent, American Civil War brigadier general, hero of the Battle of Gettysburg
