= Hardin County onion pickers strike =

1934 labor dispute in Ohio, United States

Coordinates: 40°40′45.6168″N 83°47′26.376″W

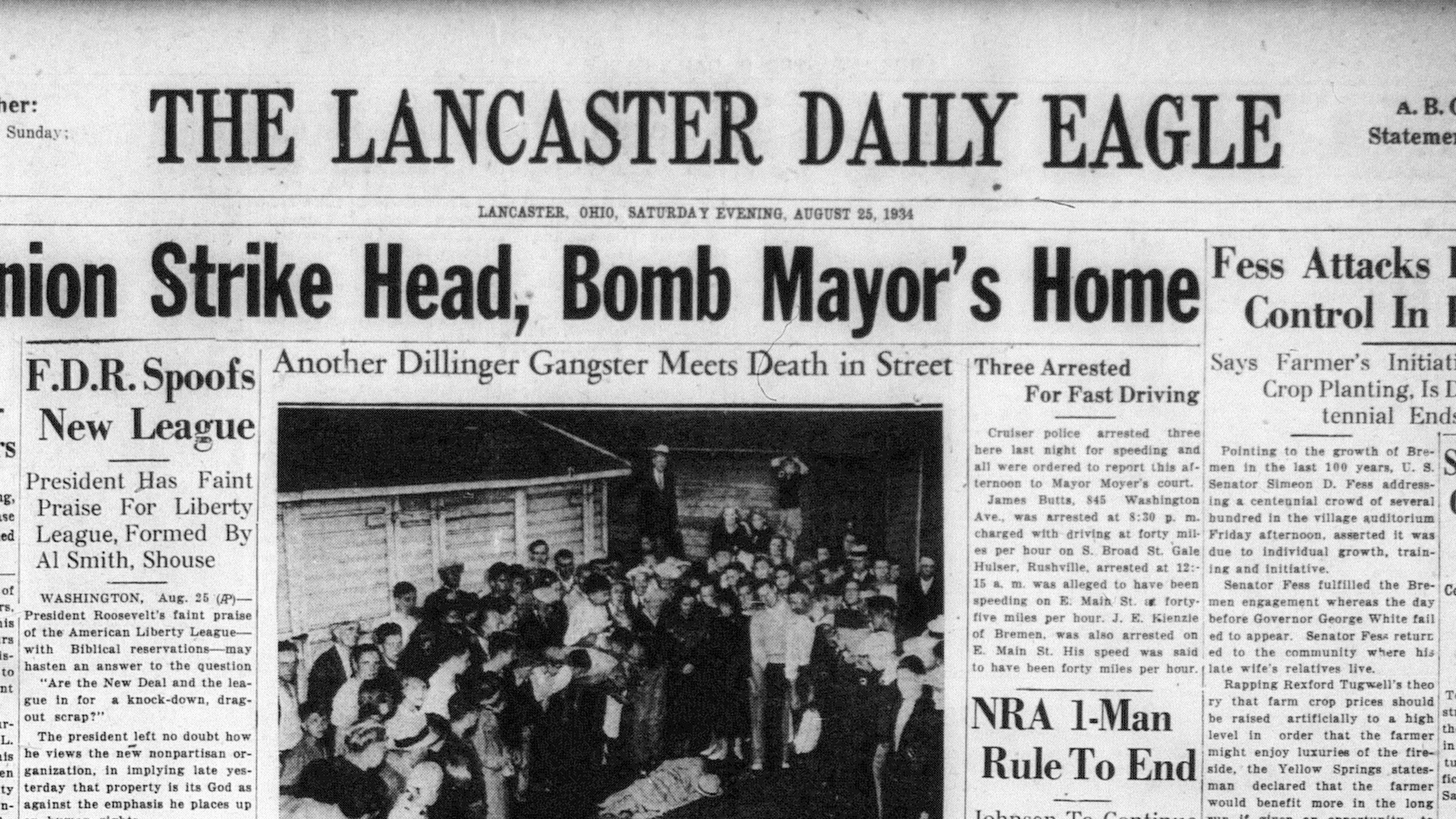
- newspaper clipping
- Date: June 20, 1934 - August 28, 1934
- Location: Hardin County, Ohio
- Caused by: Long work day, low wages, lack of access to bathroom facilities
- Goals: Standardize an eight-hour work day, and receive a 23 cents-an-hour wage increase, raise standard of working conditions
- Result: Union successfully bargained for a 13 cent-an-hour wage increase, no change to working conditions

Parties
| Agricultural Workers Union; American Civil Liberties Union, Socialist Party of America | Growers; Strikebreakers; Vigilante groups; Hardin County Sheriff; Ohio National Guard |

Lead figures
| J.M Rizor; Sam Pollock; Okey Odell | Scioto Land Company |

Number
| ~1,000 | ~250 |

The Hardin County onion pickers strike was a strike by agricultural workers in Hardin County, Ohio, in 1934. Led by the Agricultural Workers Union, Local 19724, the strike began on June 20, two days after the trade union formed. After the kidnapping and beating of the union's leader and the intervention of the Ohio National Guard on behalf of the growers, the strike ended in October with a partial victory for the union. Some growers met the union's demand for a 35-cents-an-hour minimum wage, but the majority did not.

== The Hardin County onion fields ==
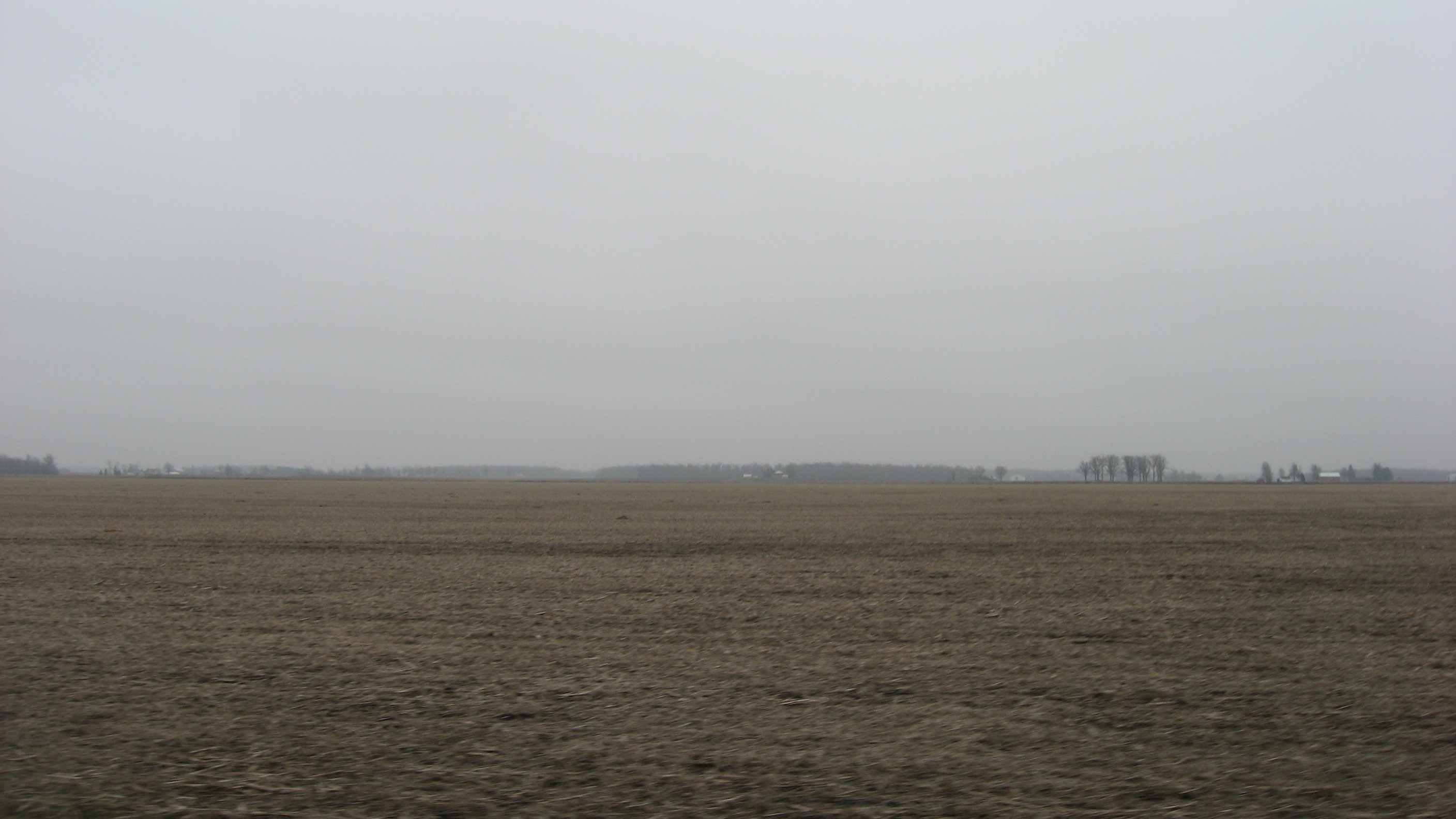
Countryside in the Hog Creek Marsh

Hardin County, Ohio, contained a large onion-growing region about 12 miles (19 km) east of the town of Lima. Two main growing areas existed. Scioto Marsh consisted of about 17,000 acres (69 km^{2}) of farmland. The top three growers controlled about 30 percent of Scioto Marsh land under cultivation. Hog Creek Marsh was a smaller growing area which consisted of about 4,000 acres (16 km^{2}). The largest owner of Hog Creek marshland controlled about a third of that area's total land under cultivation. Roughly 25 smaller growers cultivated the rest of the farmland.

Wages and working conditions for agricultural workers in Hardin County were poor even before the onset of the Great Depression. A plentiful supply of Caucasian migrant farm workers kept wages far below those of other counties and states. Working conditions were harsh. Laborers worked on their hands and knees weeding and picking onions. The work day was 10 hours long, with a 15-minute break for lunch and no overtime. There were no toilet facilities or restroom breaks, and water and first aid for injuries or heat exhaustion were not provided. The black earth absorbed heat, and temperatures near the ground could reach 120 degrees Fahrenheit (49 degrees Celsius). Many workers lived in employer-provided housing, and were given an employer-owned milk cow (on loan) to prevent starvation.

Crop yields from the Hardin County onion fields were declining significantly by 1930 due to soil exhaustion as crop rotation was not practiced. As the Great Depression worsened, growers reduced the amount of land under cultivation even further to only 3,500 acres (14 km^{2}). Growers also cut wages and required laborers to work longer hours.

By June 1934, economic conditions for farm workers in Hardin County were especially severe. The prevailing wage was 12 cents an hour, but many workers earned only 8 cents an hour. Eight out of 10 families were considered to be living in extreme poverty, and almost half of all workers reported working only 26 days a year.

== Legality of farm labor unions ==
When the National Labor Relations Act (NLRA) was passed in 1935, it specifically exempted agricultural workers from the protection of the law. Although it was not illegal for farm workers to organize unions, federal (and state) law did not protect their ability to do so. Subsequently, most employers discriminated heavily against agricultural workers who attempted to form unions, and used a variety of techniques (many heavy-handed, and some actually coercive) to resist farm unionization.

== Beginning of the strike ==
On June 18 and June 19, 1934, weeders and pickers working on onion farms in Hardin County formed a union, the Agricultural Workers Union, under the leadership of Okey Odell, a 38-year-old weeder. The workers were assisted by J.M. Rizor, an organizer for the International Quarrymen's Union. Their union was recognized by the American Federation of Labor (AFL) as a federal union, and listed as Local 19724.

The workers immediately demanded recognition of their union, a 23-cents-an-hour wage increase (to obtain a minimum wage of 35 cents an hour), and an eight-hour work day.

Led by the top four landowners, the 30 growers formed the Onion Growers' Association to oppose the union. Odell and Rizor asked to meet with the Association, but the growers refused and said they would let their fields be overgrown with weeds first. The growers subsequently told the press that meeting with the union was pointless, since the growers were already losing money. The union challenged this claim, pointing out that at least one grower had recently purchased three new automobiles. But the growers stuck by their claim. A few weeks later, the Ohio state legislature asked the growers to open their books as part of a state investigation into the strike. But the growers declined to do so. To the union, this was merely additional evidence that the growers were profitable.

Odell called a strike on June 20. About 800 of the county's 1,000 onion field workers walked out. To prevent replacement workers from entering the fields and breaking the strike, the strikers attempted to stop and search all automobiles entering the Scioto Marsh and Hog Creek Marsh areas. For the first week of the strike, there was no violence. The Socialist Party of America and the American Civil Liberties Union raised funds for strike relief.

The union also received assistance from the Ohio Unemployed League. The League was a branch of the American Workers Party (AWP). The goal of the League was to organize jobless workers, advocate for higher relief payments for the unemployed, and help the unemployed resist employer calls to take striking workers' jobs. The League and the union struck a deal which provided for the legal defense of union members by the AWP and the League. League leaders obtained representation on the union's strike committee, assurances that the strike would be carried out using militant tactics, and that no settlement of the strike would be made without agreement of the strikers. Pursuant to this agreement, Toledo League leader Sam Pollock became part of the union's strike leadership team.

=== Injunction ===
The growers immediately went to court to prevent the union from picketing in the fields.

On June 22, Court of Common Pleas Judge Hamilton E. Hoge issued one of the most sweeping anti-labor injunctions in American history.

The injunction restricted picketing to groups of two. Judge Hoge left it up to the discretion of sheriffs' deputies how far apart each group must be. Initially, the union established 34 pickets at least 25 feet (7.6 m) apart. Deputies arrested half the strikers. The union increased the distance between pickets to 50 yards (46 m), and still arrests occurred. Distance between pickets was extended to 100 yards (91 m), then a one-quarter mile (400 m), and in some cases a one-half mile (800 m). Arrests continued. On a number of occasions, deputies called pickets together and, when they obeyed, arrested them for congregating unlawfully.

To enforce the injunction, 54 "special" sheriff's deputies were hired and sworn in. The deputies' salaries were paid for by the growers. Although the deputies technically remained under the supervision of the Hardin County sheriff, the deputies were under the control of the growers and their field foremen. Most of the special sheriff's deputies were members of the Hardin County detachment of the Ohio National Guard and veterans of the Auto-Lite strike in nearby Toledo, which had only recently ended. The National Guard troops, most of whom were only 18 years old, were determined not to be intimidated by the picketers as they had been in Toledo. The newly appointed special deputies were armed with riot guns, machine guns, and tear gas equipment from the National Guard armory in Kenton, Ohio.

The union demanded to know why the state was providing the county with troops. When Governor George White was asked why the special deputies were recruited solely from the Ohio National Guard, he replied that the guardsmen were merely private citizens who had sought temporary employment. The governor saw no problem with arming the county deputies with state-owned weaponry or having full-time, on-duty officers of the Ohio National Guard command and drill the special deputies.

The special deputies quickly proved unruly. Local citizens complained that the guards were harassing them. The sheriff referred complaints to the commanding general of the Ohio National Guard, who then told petitioners that this was a matter for the local county sheriff. When prominent Hardin County business leaders forced the sheriff to deal with these problems, the sheriff ordered an investigation. But the investigation was never carried out, and the National Guard troops' behavior worsened.

=== First settlement attempt and outbreak of violence ===
On June 27, the United States Department of Labor sent a mediator to Hardin County to help settle the strike. The growers agreed to raise the minimum wage to 15 cents an hour, but the union rejected the offer.

After the settlement's rejection, employers began evicting workers from employer-owned homes.

The employers also began to resort to violence to protect their replacement workers and break the strike. Vigilante groups were formed which beat strikers and union sympathizers, and ran them out of town at gunpoint. Shots were fired at picketers and at union members attending meetings. The growers hired another 50 special deputies to patrol the fields with machine guns, and special deputies used extensive amounts of tear gas to harass and break up pickets. National Guard troops began clubbing and beating picketers whenever they encountered them. On June 29, two strikers were shot and wounded by National Guard troops after they attempted to stop a truck of strikebreakers from entering a field.

Union members and their supporters also resorted to violence. The growers began large-scale importation of replacement workers to break the strike. When they could intercept trucks carrying replacement workers, the strikers would throw rocks, bricks and bottles at the strikebreakers. Fistfights broke out whenever striking workers and strikebreakers encountered one another. Union members and sympathizers cut telephone wires throughout the county, blew up bridges, scattered nails on roads to stop and slow truck traffic, fired shots at strikebreakers, burned warehouses, and set off small explosions in towns, villages and onion processing stations throughout the county. Strikers even bombed the home of the owner of the Scioto Land Company, the largest landowner in Scioto Marsh.

The level of violence led to a large number of arrests. Over the next 20 days, more than 60 picketers were arrested. Odell was arrested and charged with contempt of court for violating Judge Hoge's injunction. A Scioto Land Company official had approached Odell on the street and brandished a gun in his face. Arrested by the town marshal, the official retaliated by having Odell arrested for "congregating" in violation of the injunction. Odell served 10 days in jail for contempt of court. Pollock, too, was arrested and jailed. When a truckload of strikebreakers attempted to run down a group of pickets, the pickets (led by Pollock) retaliated by hurling stones and bottles at the truck. Pollock was charged with unlawful assemblage, inciting to riot, and malicious destruction of property. Pollock's wife and defense lawyers were unlawfully denied access to him for several days. When they finally did see him, sheriff's deputies stood close by to intimidate them and listen in on their privileged conversation.

== Bombing of the mayor's home and seizure of the town of McGuffey ==
Near dawn on the morning of August 25, 1934, a bomb exploded at the home of Godfrey Ott, mayor of the town of McGuffey, Ohio. The explosion ripped away an entire side of the home. Although the mayor and his wife were sleeping in the home at the time, they were not injured. The leader of the Onion Farmers was charismatic Veril Baldwin who was accused of hypnotizing opposition during negotiations to get a settlement to avoid violence

Although he denied any involvement with the bombing, Odell was arrested minutes later and taken to the Hardin County jail (which was located in the town of McGuffey). However, sheriff's deputies refused to charge Odell. As Odell was being booked, about 200 anti-union vigilantes rushed the jail, seized Odell, took him out of the jail and threw him on a waiting truck. Sheriff's deputies stopped the truck and demanded to know if Odell was aboard. Odell claimed he shouted to let the deputies know he was there, but the deputies ignored him. Odell also claimed that at least 15 sheriff's deputies were in the jail and could have prevented his abduction, but the county sheriff contended that only three deputies were on hand. To Odell and union sympathizers, the sheriff's deputies appeared to be cooperating in the kidnapping.

Odell was taken to Waynesfield, a small village in Auglaize County about 12 miles (19 km) away. There, Odell was beaten and threatened with death, then taken to a highway in mid-afternoon and left at the side of the road.

During the day, the town of McGuffey was seized by hundreds of armed anti-union vigilantes. The vigilantes patrolled the town on foot and accosted any citizens they found on the street. They demanded to know if the citizen was a union supporter. If the individual claimed not to be taking sides in the strike, the vigilantes threatened them with death and told them to leave town. As the capture of the town continued throughout the day, union members and their families barricaded themselves inside their homes, fearing for their lives.

During the afternoon, Odell hitch hiked back to McGuffey. He obtained a revolver from his home and then walked with his brother through the center of town, defying the vigilantes to kill him. Odell returned home in the late afternoon.

After Odell returned to his house, a crowd of 200 men and women gathered in front of the building and demanded that he leave town or suffer the consequences. Odell replied, "Tell them to go to hell." Odell then went to bed, a revolver under his pillow and armed union guards stationed throughout the house. The crowd continued to surround Odell's house throughout the evening, shouting obscenities and threatening Odell and his family. Only five sheriff's deputies stood nearby to handle the mob. Around midnight, the crowd climbed into cars and trucks and paraded around Odell's home, honking horns and brandishing clubs. The vigilante caravan then headed to the nearby town of Alger, where they threatened three other union leaders. One union leader, Floyd Collins, was ill and had to be secretly rushed out of town.

That same day, United States Secretary of Labor Frances Perkins sent Robert C. Fox, another federal mediator, to Hardin County to try to end the strike.

The day after his kidnapping, Odell sought to invoke the Federal Kidnapping Act, a new federal statute enacted in 1932 in the wake of the Lindbergh kidnapping. But on August 27, a federal prosecutor said the Federal Kidnapping act would not apply as Odell had not been taken across state lines or held for more than five days.

== Conclusion of the strike ==
On August 28, federal mediator Fox met with Ott, several large growers, and Odell. Odell agreed to reduce his demand for a wage increase to 25 cents an hour. The discussions went so well that Fox felt a resolution to the strike could be reached within a few days. Odell later told the press he had made no such concession.

The strike, however, was close to an end. The 800 strikers had dwindled to a handful as violence drove them from the picket lines. The larger growers were able to employ significant numbers of replacement workers, and onion production was nearly back to full capacity.

A few days later, several of the smaller growers signed a contract with the union. The contract raised wages to 35 cents per hour, but did not alter working conditions or recognize the union.

Within a few months, most of the strikebreakers left the area as the growing season wound down. But as onion production continued to drop over the next several years due to soil exhaustion, fewer and fewer onion weeders and pickers were needed in Hardin County. A few years after its founding, the Agricultural Workers Union faded away. By the mid-1940s, most of the Hardin County agricultural workers had been replaced by Mexican migrant workers.
