= Higher education in Erie, Pennsylvania =

Erie's collegiate scene is fairly equally split between four-year institutions and two-year business centers. Lake Erie College of Osteopathic Medicine has the largest class of medical students in the country. Penn State Erie is the largest Penn-State branch college. The longest-operating Higher Education provider in the City of Erie is the Erie Business Center, which is a private campus offering 2-year Associate Degrees. Edinboro University of Pennsylvania is the oldest campus in Erie county (about 25 miles south of Erie proper). Edinboro University is a State University, which offers a wide range of various degree programs; including a thriving Arts Department. The following are schools that are located near or around Erie:

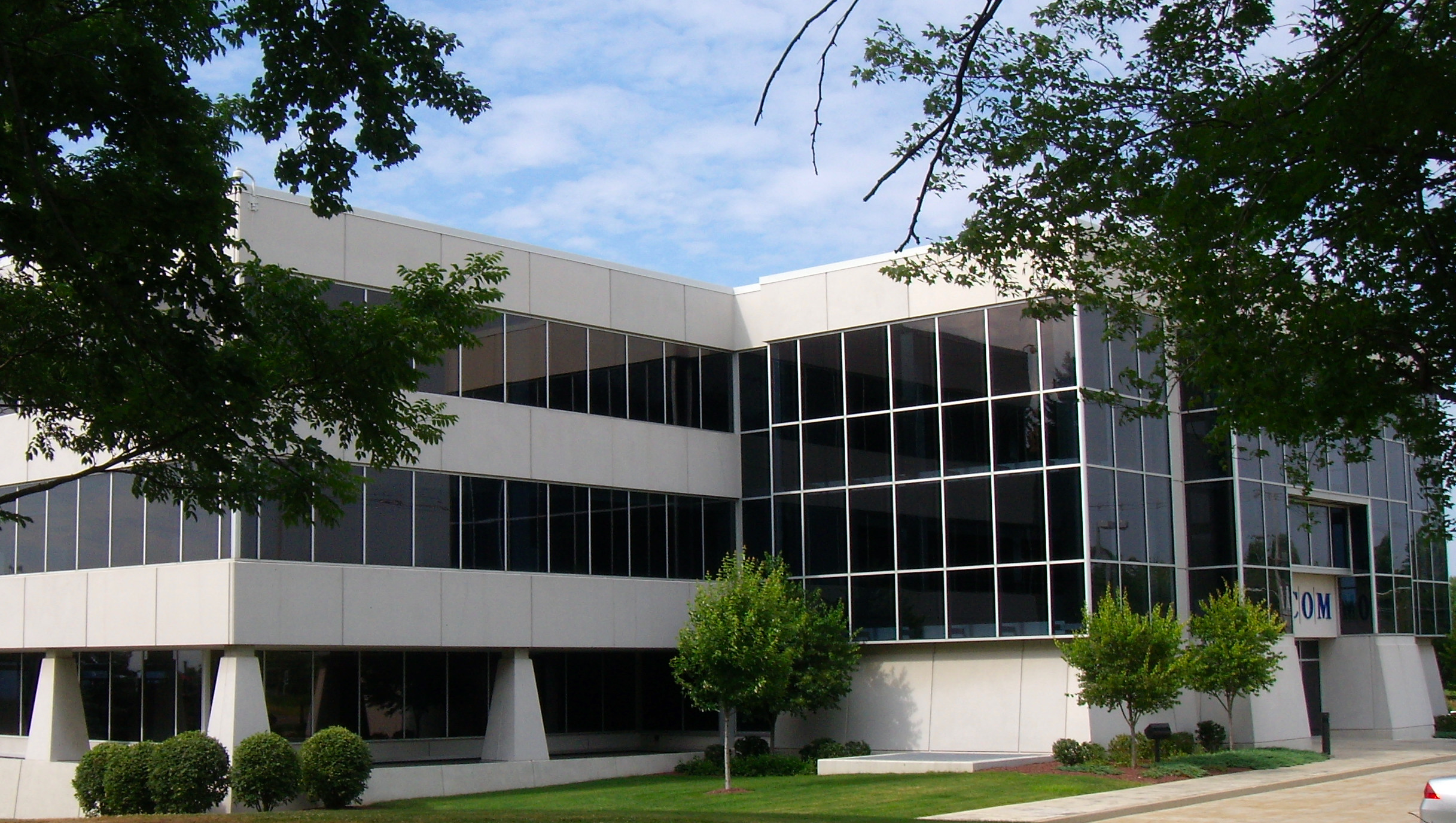
LECOM Main Campus

School name	Type of School	Location	Year Established
Corry Higher Education Council	2-Year, Private (awarded by Mercyhurst University)	Corry, Pennsylvania	1991
PennWest Edinboro	4-Year, Public	Edinboro, Pennsylvania	1857
Erie Institute of Technology	2-Year, Private	Erie, Pennsylvania	1958
Gannon University	4-Year, Private	Erie, Pennsylvania	1925
Great Lakes Institute of Technology	2-Year, Private	Erie, Pennsylvania	1965
Lake Erie College of Osteopathic Medicine	Graduate School, Private	Erie, Pennsylvania	1992
Mercyhurst University	4-Year, Private	Erie, Pennsylvania	1926
Mercyhurst North East	2-Year, Private	North East, Pennsylvania	1991
Penn State Erie, The Behrend College	4-Year, State-related	Erie, Pennsylvania	1948
Toni&Guy	Less than 1-Year, Private	Erie, Pennsylvania	2008
Fortis Institute	2-Year, Private	Erie, Pennsylvania	1984 (as Tri-State Business Institute)
