= Clement O. Miniger =

American industrialist and philanthropist

- Born: November 11, 1874; North East, Pennsylvania, U.S.
- Died: April 23, 1944 (aged 69); Toledo, Ohio, U.S.
- Occupation: Businessperson
- Known for: President, Electric Auto-Lite

Clement O. Miniger (November 11, 1874 – April 23, 1944) was an American industrialist and philanthropist. He founded the 'Electric Auto-Lite Company' (now part of Honeywell) in 1911, acting as the company's president until 1934 and its chairman of the board from 1934 to 1944.

== Early life ==
Clement O. Miniger was born in North East, Pennsylvania, in November 1874, to Mr. and Mrs. Samuel O. Miniger. He had a brother, Charles, and a sister, Anna. The family moved to Arcadia, Ohio, when he was a small boy, where his father built a handle factory. The Miniger family later moved to Fostoria, Ohio, where Samuel Miniger owned a livery stable and later a roller rink. "C.O.," as his friend called him, was educated in the Fostoria public schools.

He quit high school in 1890 before graduation, however, and entered a pharmacy training school in Chicago, Illinois. He quit school after two years and moved to Toledo, Ohio, becoming a traveling salesman for a wholesale drug company. In 1902 Miniger abandoned the pharmaceutical industry and purchased several coal mines near Cambridge, Ohio. He left coal mining in 1905 and purchased a paper manufacturing plant.

== Electric Auto-Lite ==
Miniger entered the automotive industry in 1911. At the time, automobile headlamps were carbide lamps powered by acetylene gas. Two men in Indiana had patented an electric headlamp which Miniger believed would replace gas-powered lamps on automobiles. Mininger purchased the patent rights to this new electric headlight in 1911. Moving back to Toledo, he formed the Auto-liter Company.

Within a year, the Auto-liter Company employed nearly 1,000 people. The company's first headquarters were in a storefront on Michigan Street, but the firm's sudden growth caused it to move quickly to a new location near the Cherry Street bridge.

In typical Miniger fashion, Miniger soon got out of the automotive industry. John Willys had arrived in Toledo in 1909 after acquiring the failing Marion Car Company of Toledo. He merged it with the Overland Company, which he had purchased in 1907, and formed a new automobile manufacturer, Willys-Overland. In 1914, Miniger sold Auto-liter to Willys. But Willys-Overland went bankrupt in 1918, and Miniger bought his company back. Miniger assisted Willys in regaining control of Willys-Overland from the Chrysler Corporation in 1921.

Back in control of Auto-liter, Miniger quickly expanded into other automotive product lines, including electric starters, ignition systems, and batteries. Calling his company Electric Auto-lite, in 1927 Miniger gained a controlling interest in the National Lead Battery Company, Prest-O-Lite Battery Company, and Prest-O-Lite, Ltd. (located in Toronto, Ontario, Canada). Battery manufacturing plants were established in seven U.S. states and in Canada. A foreign division was established and batteries manufactured in six overseas locations. Miniger bought out another headlamp company in 1934 and formed the Brown Lamp Division in Cincinnati, Ohio. The same year, he purchased outright the Starting and Lighting Division of the American Bosch Magneto Company. Late in 1934, Electric Auto-lite merged with Moto-Meter Gauge and Equipment Company and expanded into industrial gauges and thermometers, molded plastic parts, speedometers, oil pressure gauges, gasoline gauges, heat indicators and ammeters.

Miniger's financial situation suffered a strong reversal during the Great Depression. Heavily invested in banking and real estate, he lost $5 million in 1931 alone. But Miniger recovered, and built or owned a number of important buildings in the city, including Hillcrest, the Bell building, and the B.R. Baker building. He also became one of Toledo's most prominent philanthropists. He was a strong supporter of the Boys' Club of Toledo, Toledo YMCA, St. Vincent's Hospital, the Episcopal Church.

Miniger was a strong anti-unionist, and his beliefs led to a major strike against the company in 1934 which led to national headlines. From April 12 to June 3, 1934, a major strike by a federal labor union of the American Federation of Labor (AFL) led to a five-day running battle between roughly 6,000 strikers and 1,300 members of the Ohio National Guard. Known as the "Battle of Toledo", the clash left two strikers dead and more than 200 injured. Miniger was so alarmed by the violence that he ringed his home with a cordon of armed guards. The strike is regarded by many labor historians as one of the three most important strikes in U.S. history. The strike led to the creation of the Toledo Industrial Peace Board. Now called the Labor-Management-Citizens Committee, the Industrial Peace Board became a national model for strike resolution in the post-World War II period.

== Forced retirement ==
The strike led to Miniger's loss of control over the company. In late August 1934, Royce G. Martin was appointed president of Electric Auto-Lite, and Miniger became chairman of the company's board of directors.

Despite his lack of day-to-day control over the firm, Miniger nonetheless continued to play a vital role in the company. He pushed for Electric Auto-lite to continue its expansion into additional automotive fields. Miniger helped structure the company's purchase of Alemite Die Casting in 1935, and later forced it to expand into the manufacture of radiator grilles, door handles, and assorted automotive hardware. The company purchased a bumper plant, hub cap plant, and spring cover plant the following year at his insistence, and built its first spark plug plant in 1936.

Clement O. Miniger died at his suburban Toledo home on April 23, 1944.

== Posthumous philanthropy ==
Miniger's first wife, Eleanor, preceded him in death, and he soon remarried. In his will, Miniger bequeathed more than $1 million to his second wife, Edna, and his daughter, Eleanor.

His will established the Clement O. Miniger Memorial Foundation, which still exists in 2024. The Clement O. Miniger Radiation Oncology Center at the Medical College of Ohio is named for him.

Clement O. Miniger was inducted into the Toledo Hall of Fame in 2007.
