= Winifred Davidson =

American writer (1874–1964)

- Born: 24 February 1874; North East, Pennsylvania
- Died: 20 February 1964 (aged 89); Point Loma, San Diego
- Writing career
- Pen name: Yetta Kay Stoddard or "a San Diego historian"

Winifred Davidson born as Winifred Hall and writing as Yetta Kay Stoddard (24 February 1874 – 20 February 1964) was an American writer of children's short stories and poetry. She was also credited with co-creating a large archive of information about San Diego in California. She was President of the American Literary Association and vice-President of the British Poetry Society.

== Life ==
Davidson was born in North East, Pennsylvania to Catherine and Russell Hall.

In the 1920s she wrote for The Brownies' Book which existed for 24 monthly issues under the leadership of Jessie Redmon Fauset. It was aimed at a multiracial group of children readers, but primarily African Americans. "Yetta Kay Stoddard" was identified as one of their "notable black writers".

Davidson was a founding member of the San Diego Historical Society and she worked as a local historian in partnership with her husband, John. They were married for over sixty years and they were credited with curating the largest store of information on the history of San Diego. She has the Historian and her husband was the curator and finally Director of the Junipero Serra Museum in Presidio Park.

She was President of the American Literary Association for ten years and vice-President of the British Poetry Society.

She died in Point Loma, San Diego in 1964.

== Works ==
- A Brief History of the Old Spanish Lighthouse, 1926
- Point Loma Sonnets
- Where California Began, 1929
