= Lake Shore Seminary =

School in North East, Pennsylvania (1870–1881)

Location
- 16 W. Division Street; North East, Pennsylvania; United States

Information
- School type: Private Preparatory School and College
- Religious affiliation: Methodist Episcopal Church
- Opened: August 1871
- Closed: 1881

Lake Shore Seminary was an American educational institution in North East, Pennsylvania. This coeducational high school and college opened in 1871 as a collaborative effort of the Methodist and Presbyterian churches. It included a campus of 84 acres (34 ha) and a newly constructed four-story building. Although it attracted 150 students, the opening debts of the school and the withdrawal of the Presbyterian church from the effort resulted in bankruptcy. Lake Shore Seminary closed in 1881. Later its campus was used for Saint Mary's College and Mercyhurst North East.

== History ==
In the 1860s, the Erie Conference of the Methodist Episcopal Church decided to create a seminary in North East, Pennsylvania because the community lacked a public high school. The Lake Shore Seminary was chartered by the Supreme Court of Pennsylvania for "a literary purpose" in 1867. On April 13, 1867, the Pennsylvania State Senate and Pennsylvania House of Representatives gave the seminary's board authority to borrow money and issue bonds. Rev. John T. Oxtoby was the president of the school's board of directors.

The seminary's board secured contributions and acquired a property north of town that was previously owned by the Hall family. Construction of a building began in 1867; the cornerstone was placed in October 1868 and the building was completed in 1870. The building was estimated to cost $30,000 (equivalent to $725,625 in 2025). Because of this large cost, the Erie Conference collaborated with the Presbyterian Church to create and run the seminary. In total, the new school cost $75,000 (equivalent to $1,909,539 in 2025), with the community supporting some of its cost.

Lake Shore Seminary opened in August 1871 as a coeducational preparatory school and college. Its professors included J. P. Mills, L. T. Kirke, and Wilbur Garrison Williams. Mills was the school's first principal and president of its faculty. Laura Reddy Buckey served as its preceptress.

By 1873, the school has 150 students. However, the Presbyterians became unsatisfied with the joint management of the seminary and withdrew their support. The Erie Conference could not carry the school's debts on its own. In January 1877, it was advertised that the school would be sold at the Erie County Sherriff's sale; however, newspapers in February noted that the seminary avoided being sold for its debts. H. U. Johnson became the seminary's principal in July 1877. The Lake Shore Seminary went bankrupt in 1881.

The seminary's trustees tried to sell the campus to the U.S. government for use as a school for Native Americans. When that initiative failed, it was sold through a bankruptcy sale. The People's Savings Institution (later North East Savings Bank) acquired the seminary's building and grounds in a sheriff's sale. The bank was the primary creditor in the seminary's bankruptcy. The bank sold the former campus to the Redemptorists Fathers of Annapolis, Maryland on February 1, 1881, for $10,000 (equivalent to $333,621 in 2025). They established a preparatory school for Catholic priests called St. Mary's College that opened on August 2, 1881. The Redemptorists expanded the campus buildings but closed the high school in 1987. Mercyhurst College purchased the former seminary in 1991 and used it as Mercyhurst North East until 2020.

== Campus ==
The campus of Lake Shore Seminary was located on Division and North Lake Streets (now 16 W. Division Street) on the highest point in North East, Pennsylvania. It had a view of Lake Erie. It consisted of 84 acres (34 ha) and a building constructed in 1870. The brick building was in the Second Empire style and had four stories, that included classrooms, a dining room, a chapel that could seat 400 people, and dormitories for 100 students. It was 168 feet long and 60 feet deep.

== Academics ==
Although affiliated with the Methodist Church, the seminary's curriculum was non-denominational. The seminary taught ancient and modern language, drawing, English, mathematics, metaphysics, music, painting, and teaching. Students could enter the school at any time. The Pennsylvania legislature allowed the seminary to issue certificates, literary degrees, Bachelor of Arts (BA) degrees, and Masters of Arts (MA) degrees. However, the seminar closed before it "reached the grade for which it was intended". The school graduated many teachers who taught in the state's public school system.

In 1876, the cost for tuition, room, and board was $33 to $35 per quarter, equivalent to $998 to $1,058 in 2025. Students and teachers had a cooperative system for board, keeping costs to $1.97 a week, equivalent to $60 in 2025.

== Student life ==
The seminary had a chapter of the Delta Tau Delta fraternity from 1871 to 1875.

== Notable alumni ==
- Francis Newton Thorpe, legal scholar, historian, political scientist, and professor
- Emory A. Walling, Supreme Court of Pennsylvania justice
