= The Brownies' Book =

1920s children's magazine

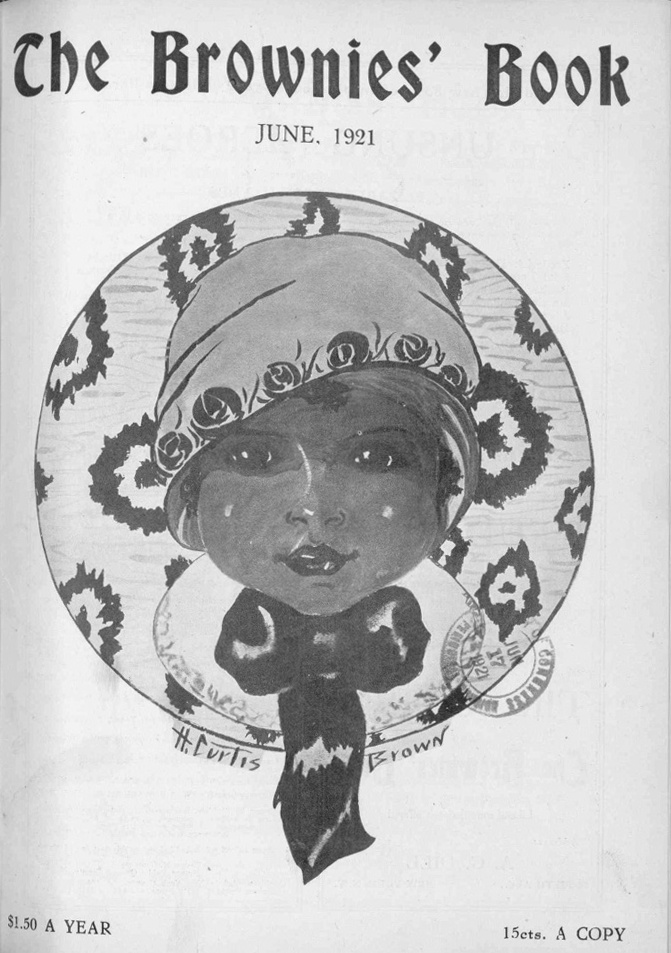
- Cover of the June 1921 issue
- Literary and managing editor: Jessie Redmon Fauset
- Frequency: Monthly
- Founder: W. E. B. Du Bois; Augustus Granville Dill; Jessie Redmon Fauset
- First issue: January 1920
- Final issue: December 1921
- Country: United States
- Based in: New York City

The Brownies' Book was the first magazine published for African-American children and youth. Its creation was mentioned in the yearly children's issue of The Crisis in October 1919. The first issue was published during the Harlem Renaissance in January 1920, with issues published monthly until December 1921. It is cited as an "important moment in literary history" for establishing black children's literature in the United States.

== Background ==
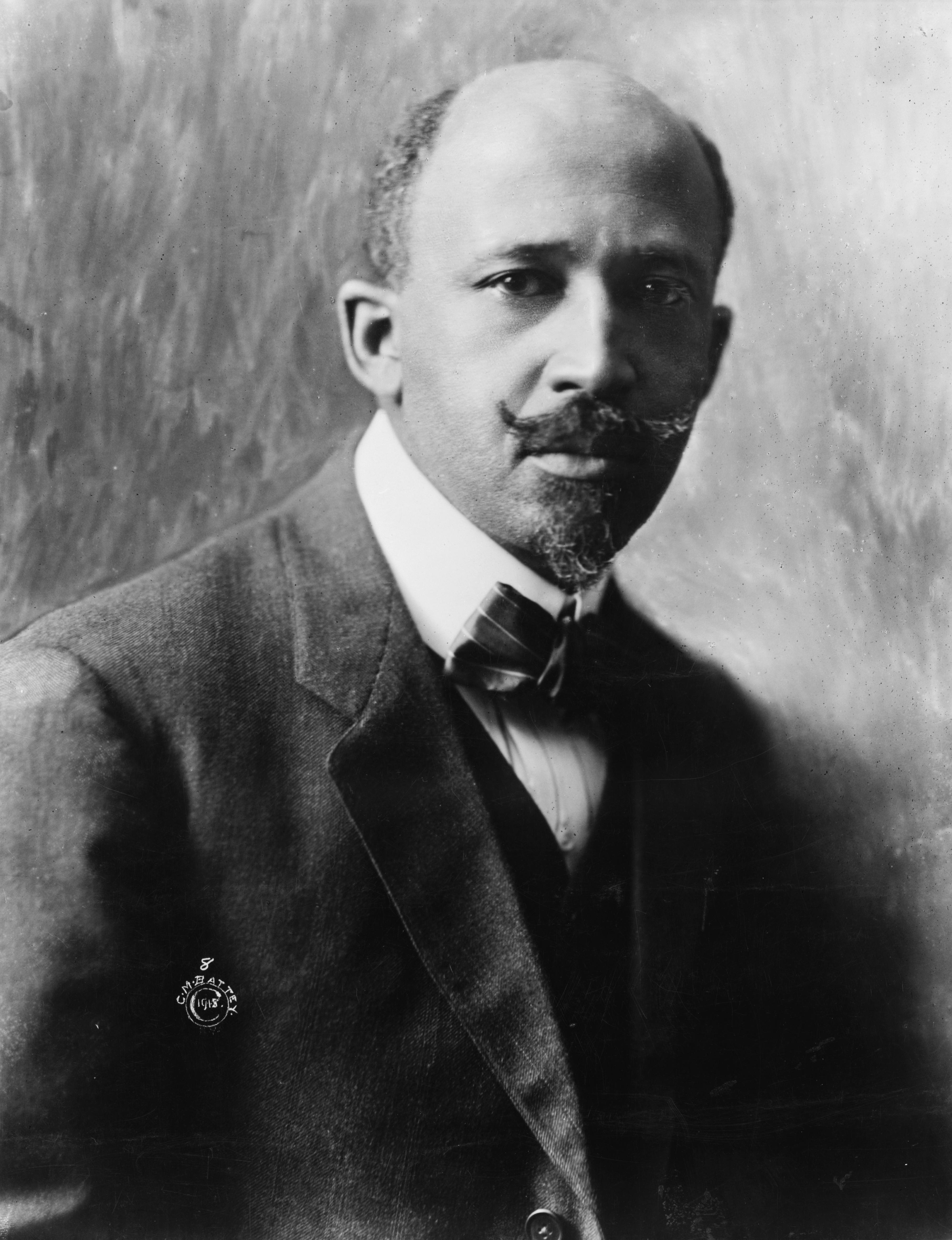
W. E. B. Du Bois, one of the founders of The Brownies' Book

The magazine was created by three people, all of whom were also involved with The Crisis, a magazine associated with the National Association for the Advancement of Colored People (NAACP). Its editor was W. E. B. Du Bois, one of the founders of the NAACP, and its business manager was Augustus Granville Dill. The magazine's literary editor was Jessie Redmon Fauset.

Each year, The Crisis published an issue referred to as the "Children's Number", which included stories, photographs, games, poetry, and educational achievements of black children. These issues also contained more serious information, particularly about political events and lynchings in the United States; Du Bois covered lynchings and violent attacks on black Americans because he was concerned about the effects that reports of these incidents would have on black children.

In the October 1919 "Children's Number" issue of The Crisis, Du Bois wrote a column titled "The True Brownies" announcing the impending publication of The Brownies' Book, stating that the first issue would be released the following month. He also stated that it was "designed for all children, but especially for ours", with a target audience of children and youth between six and 16 years old. Dill and Du Bois established Du Bois and Dill Publishers in New York City to publish each issue of The Brownies' Book.

One of the goals of the magazine was to dispel the "grotesque stereotypes" of the "Dark Continent", a disparaging term used for Africa and its people. Middle-class African-American children "consumed this propaganda along with the white children who were its implied audience" in children's literary works such as those of the magazine St. Nicholas. The 1919 article "The True Brownies" included commentary by Du Bois discussing children, stating that "to seek to raise them in ignorance of their racial identity and peculiar situation is inadvisable—impossible", in which the use of the phrase "peculiar situation" is an allusion to the euphemism "peculiar institution", meaning slavery. Du Bois believed children should be taught their racial identity and social situation. The name of the magazine is derived from the folkloric brownies, creatures who were said to complete household chores at night in exchange for food, alluding to African Americans being used as servants, but the term is used as signification in the "oppressive literary-historical context". Specifically, the creators wanted to "make colored children realize that being 'colored' is a normal beautiful thing".

Another goal was to expand the canon of black children's literature, in which fiction and fantasy were rare, and to encourage youth participation in the NAACP. It also intended to develop The Talented Tenth, capable African Americans in the top decile who could become leaders in the black community.

The seven goals stated in "The True Brownies" were:

*To make colored children realize that being "colored" is a normal, beautiful thing.

- To make them familiar with the history and achievements of the Negro race.
- To make them know that other colored children have grown into beautiful, useful and famous persons.
- To teach them a delicate code of honor and action in their relations with white children.
- To turn their little hurts and resentments into emulation, ambition and love of their homes and companions.
- To point out the best amusements and joys and worth-while things of life.
- To inspire them to prepare for definite occupations and duties with a broad spirit of sacrifice.

— W. E. B. Du Bois, "The True Brownies", The Crisis, October 1919

== Content and editing ==
Each issue was published on good quality paper, the cover of each designed by prominent black artists. Its format and layout was similar to that of The Crisis, and it contained little advertising. Illustrations and photographs complemented the varied content, which included poetry, literature, biographies of successful black people, music, games, plays, and current events. Biographies included those for Phillis Wheatley, the first published African-American woman, Bert Williams, a popular entertainer of the Vaudeville era, and Sojourner Truth, an abolitionist and women's rights activist that had been born into slavery. The advertising it did include promoted black children's literature not typically available in bookstores. Each issue cost 15 cents, with a yearly subscription costing US$1.5.

Common elements in each issue were the column "As the Crow Flies", written by Du Bois to relate current events to the children, an advice column by Fauset titled "The Judge", a reader's letters section named "The Jury", and "Little People of the Month" featuring photographs and the artistic and academic achievements of children submitted by its readers. Content generated by Du Bois would exhibit his "opposition to the social philosophy" of Booker T. Washington. His articles for "As the Crow Flies" were usually at "a level incredibly sophisticated for a children's magazine". The inaugural issue contained a photo of African-American children protesting violence against blacks by marching in the Silent Parade of 1917 in New York City.

Fauset solicited submissions from many notable authors, particularly those in the Harlem Renaissance movement. Among notable authors to have material published in The Brownies' Book were Langston Hughes, Nella Larsen, Winifred Davidson, Effie Lee Newsome and Georgia Douglas Johnson. Some of the authors had read St. Nicholas as children, including Du Bois' daughter Yolande and Newsome.

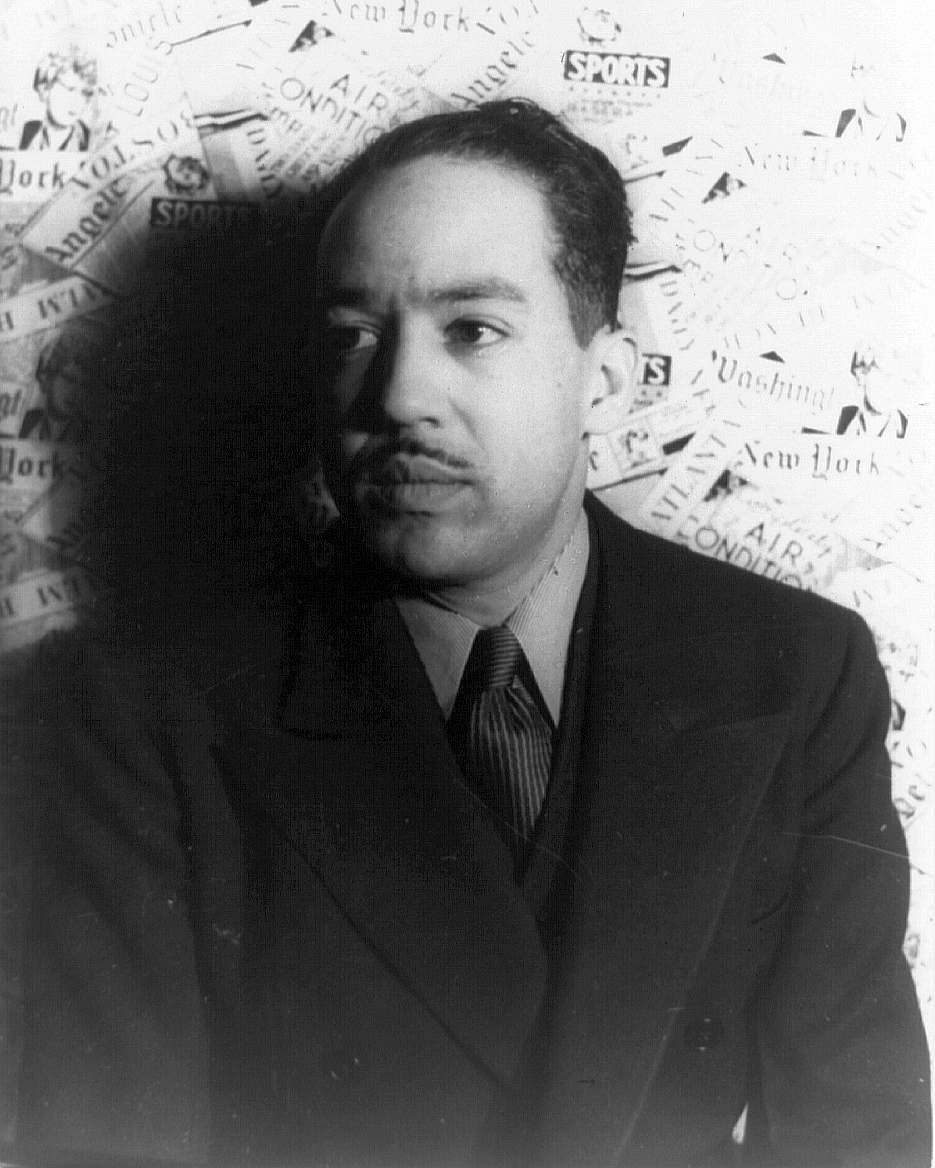
Langston Hughes in 1936, photographed by Carl Van Vechten

Hughes submitted a letter to the editor and his high school graduation photograph to the magazine, which published it in one of its summer issues with those of other high school graduates. In 1921, The Brownies' Book became the first publication to publish his poetry, and it would publish more of his works in subsequent issues. Fauset requested Hughes to write about life in Mexico because of its exotic appeal in the United States. Larsen's first literary works were two articles about games she claimed she learned and played during her youth in Denmark, published in The Brownies' Book with the byline attributing Nella Larsen Imes.

Although Fauset was the literary editor, she was also likely responsible for most of the managing editorial work, a role by which she was officially recognized in the second year of the magazine's publication. She also dealt with all correspondence, and wrote hundreds of the articles that appeared in the magazine. Fauset promoted the work of African-American women authors and illustrators, for some of whom it launched their career.

== Legacy ==
The periodical magazine has garnered more critical attention than any other black children's literature produced during the Harlem Renaissance.

The Du Bois and Dill Publishers ceased operations after publication of The Brownies' Book was discontinued. Its only other publication was the 1921 book Unsung Heroes by Elizabeth Ross Haynes.
