= Sam Pollock (labor leader) =

American activist

Samuel Pollock (June 21, 1909 – March 4, 1983) was an American labor union activist and leader. He helped lead two important strikes in 1934, the Auto-Lite Strike and the Hardin County onion pickers strike, before becoming district president of the Amalgamated Meat Cutters and Butcher Workmen of North America.

== Labor activism ==
When the Great Depression began in 1929, Pollock became deeply involved in the Ohio Unemployed League, a branch of the American Workers Party (AWP). The goal of the League was to organize jobless workers, advocate for higher relief payments for the unemployed, and help the unemployed resist employer calls to take striking workers' jobs.

In April 1934, Pollock became a leader in the bitter and violent strike by automobile parts workers at the Electric Auto-Lite plant in Toledo. Pollock and fellow League organizer Ted Selander essentially ran the strike, along with AWP leader Louis Budenz, planning mass marches which forced the plant to close.

When a local court judge issued an injunction limiting the number of picketers, Pollock and Selander wrote a letter to the judge declaring that the Lucas County Unemployed League would "deliberately and specifically violate the injunction enjoining us from sympathetically picketing peacefully in support of the striking auto workers' federal union."

Pollock was arrested and convicted for picketing in violation of the court injunction on May 7, but his sentence was suspended. He was arrested again on May 11, but released by the court without any decision in his case.

The strike erupted in rioting on May 23. Pollock played a significant, but minor part in the negotiations which helped end the strike on June 2, 1934. After the strike, Pollock lost his job and was blacklisted for his activities on behalf of the union.

Just a few weeks later, Pollock became deeply involved in the Hardin County onion pickers strike. On June 19, 1934, onion weeders formed the first union of farm laborers in the United States, under the auspices of the International Quarrymen's Union. When the 30 employers belonging to the Onion Growers' Association refused to recognize or bargain with the union, the union called a strike.

On June 22, a local judge issued a sweeping labor injunction which restricted picketing to groups of two. Local sheriff's deputies began mass arrests of the picketers for congregating in violation of the injunction.

The county sheriff, supplied with funds provided by the employers, hired Ohio National Guard troops who had recently served in Toledo during the Auto-Lite strike, and armed them with riot guns, machine guns, and tear gas. Protests from Governor George White regarding the use of public equipment for private use were ignored.

The troops helped break the strike by forcing workers off the picket lines, and arrested hundreds of workers. When a truck full of replacement workers attempted to run down a group of picketers, the picketers retaliated by throwing stones. Pollock was jailed, and a $1,000 bail set for this incident.

Pollock was held incommunicado for several days. When the local sheriff did tell Sarah Pollock where her husband was, he denied her access to him. When Pollock finally met with his defense attorneys, sheriff's deputies crowded close to listen in on the conversations and physically intimidate the lawyers. The strike ended shortly thereafter without agreement, and the union disbanded.

== Union career ==
Pollock was labeled a radical for his involvement with the AWP and the two strikes and ostracized from the mainstream labor movement. However, in 1938 Pollock was hired by the Amalgamated Meat Cutters to help organize a new local in Akron, Ohio. This organizing drive was highly successful, and the workers formed Local 372.

In 1941 Pollock was appointed a national organizer with the Amalgamated Meat Cutters. Local 372 merged with Amalgamated District 427 in 1950 and moved its headquarters to Cleveland. Pollock and his family moved there as well.

In 1951, Pollock was elected president of another Amalgamated Meat Cutters local. He held this post until his retirement in 1973. Pollock was appointed Interim District President in 1952, and elected to the position in his own right in 1953.

During his tenure, Pollock negotiated a number of progressive collective bargaining agreements. Just a few years after his presidency began, Pollock had negotiated contracts which limited the work week to 40 hours and significantly raised wages.

Pollock was particularly interested in health care for workers. In 1955 he won establishment of an employer-paid health and welfare fund, one of the first in the nation. In 1964, Pollock successfully negotiated the creation of the Community Health Foundation, a prepaid, direct-service medical care program. A year later he won an agreement to establish a portable national employer-funded pension plan for all Amalgamated members.

In 1958, Pollock helped defeat a right-to-work amendment to the Ohio constitution. During this political battle, he was extremely active on The committee to Oppose the Ohio Right to Work Amendment.

== Personal life ==
Pollock was born in Cleveland, Ohio in 1909 to Isadore and Sonia (Gordon) Pollock. In 1914 the Pollocks moved to Toledo. Pollock attended public school in Toledo, graduating in 1926. He attended both the University of Toledo and Bowling Green State University, but did not graduate from either institution.

He married Sally DeVera Kooperman in April 1934. The couple had a daughter, Frances, who died in 1968.

During his lifetime, Sam Pollock developed an extensive collection of labor literature. It became one of the largest and most respected private collections of union-related publications in the United States. At the time of his death, the collection numbered about 10,000 volumes including books, magazines, journals and other publications on labor history, socialism, communism, and economic and social theory. Many of the works were signed by their authors and most are classified as rare books.

Pollock retired in 1973. He and his wife moved to Chatsworth, California. Pollock remained only semi-retired, however, as he taught courses in health policy at California State University, Northridge. Pollock died in Chatsworth in 1983. Pollock's grandson is the noted experimental filmmaker Damon Packard.
