= Auto-Lite strike (1934) =

Workers' strike in Toledo, Ohio

- Part of US manufacturing strikes
- Date: April 12, 1934 – June 3, 1934
- Location: Toledo, Ohio, United States
- Goals: Union recognition & organization
- Methods: Strikes, Protest, Demonstrations

Parties
American Federation of Labor; American Workers Party	Toledo Police; Ohio National Guard

Lead figures
Louis F. Budenz	Lucas County sheriff

Number
10,000	1,350

Casualties and losses
Deaths: 2 Injuries: 200+ Arrests: 6+	Deaths: Injuries:

The Toledo Auto-Lite strike was a strike by a federal labor union of the American Federation of Labor (AFL) against the Electric Auto-Lite company of Toledo, Ohio, from April 12 to June 3, 1934.

The strike is notable for a five-day running battle between nearly 10,000 strikers and 1,300 members of the Ohio National Guard. Known as the "Battle of Toledo", the clash left two strikers dead and more than 200 injured. The strike is regarded by many labor historians as one of the three most important strikes in U.S. history.

== Background ==
The enactment of the National Industrial Recovery Act on June 16, 1933, led to widespread union organizing in the United States.

AFL president William Green decided to focus the federation's organizing efforts on automaking because organizing in that industry had received more attention from the national press. The problem for the federation remained its commitment to craft unionism. Auto workers, like many of the new mass production workers, were specialists rather than craftsmen, and industrial unionism appealed to them. The AFL, however, remained ardently committed to craft unionism. To balance the need to organize workers on an industrial basis without compromising its commitment to craft unionism, the AFL had early in its history settled on federal labor unions (FLUs). FLUs were temporary unions which organized workers on an industrial basis. Once the majority of workers in an industry were organized, the federal labor union would be disbanded and the workers parceled out to the AFL's unions on a craft basis.

The AFL began its organizing campaign in the auto industry in September 1933, by assigning an AFL national organizer to Detroit. By March 1934, the AFL had established an FLU at Buick and Hudson Motor Car Company, and two at Fisher Body. Roughly 32,500 auto workers had joined the federation.

=== The Automobile Labor Board agreement ===
March 1934 proved to be a difficult month. On March 4, the four automotive FLUs voted to strike unless management recognized their union, instituted a 20 percent wage increase and reinstated all workers fired for union activity. Green, committed to labor peace and fearful that the FLUs were too weak to withstand a strike, attempted to persuade them to rescind the strike notice. But President Franklin D. Roosevelt, worried that an auto strike would harm the chances for economic recovery during the Great Depression, offered to negotiate a settlement. Roosevelt ordered the National Labor Board to hear the workers' grievances, and the FLUs postponed the strike. Roosevelt himself stepped into the negotiations. On March 25, Roosevelt announced the creation of an Automobile Labor Board composed of one representative from management, one representative from labor, and a "neutral third party" to review allegations of anti-union activity. Roosevelt endorsed management's proposal to permit the recognition of company unions and the principle of proportional representation.

Green avidly endorsed the settlement, in accordance with his belief in the social gospel and lifelong refusal to endorse militancy in labor relations. But in doing so, he lost the confidence of the auto workers. Membership in automobile FLUs dropped by more than 14,000 to just 18,244 by the spring of 1934.

=== The Great Depression ===
The city of Toledo was financially devastated by the Great Depression. The Willys-Overland automobile company, the city's largest employer, declared bankruptcy. The Ohio Bond and Security Bank, the city's largest bank, collapsed, along with most of the city's banks and savings and loan associations. Near bankruptcy, the city of Toledo laid off hundreds of workers, including 150 police. Unemployment in the city reached 70 percent.

== The Auto-Lite strike ==
Against this background, workers in Federal Labor Union 18384 began agitating for management to recognize their union and increase wages.

FLU 18384 had been organized differently than other FLUs. It was a multi-employer union, and its members were employed not only by the Electric Auto-Lite Company but also by the Bingham Stamping and Tool Company and the Logan Gear Company (both subsidiaries of Electric Auto-Lite) as well as the Spicer Manufacturing Company. Because of this diverse membership, workers at one employer could strike and the union would remain financially solvent. This encouraged militancy among the FLU's members, and on February 23, 1934, the Auto-Lite members engaged in a recognition strike and attempted to win a 10 percent wage increase. Nearly all FLU members at Auto-Lite walked out. The strike lasted only five days. The employees returned to work after management agreed to a 5 percent wage increase and to negotiate a contract by April 1, 1934. Both parties agreed to negotiate further over wages (the union demanded an additional 20 percent wage increase), seniority rights, the closed shop, improved working conditions, union recognition and an end to discrimination against union members and supporters.

Management declared itself unwilling to sign a new contract in early April. FLU 18384 authorized a second strike, to begin on April 12, 1934. This time, only a fourth of the Auto-Lite workers walked out. The AFL's Central Labor Council (CLC) formed a "Committee of 23", a council of the largest unions in the Toledo area, to support the strike. But the Committee of 23 proved ineffective, and the strike began to collapse.

The American Workers Party immediately entered the strike on the FLU's behalf. The American Workers Party (AWP) had been formed in 1933 from the Conference for Progressive Labor Action by A.J. Muste, a Dutch minister and non-dogmatic Marxist. Louis F. Budenz served as its executive secretary. In part, the AWP organized the unemployed so that they would not act as strikebreakers. In Lucas County, the AWP's offshoot was the Lucas County Unemployed League (LCUL), led by Ted Selander and Sam Pollock. The LCUL had been organizing jobless workers for nearly a year, leading demonstrations and other public actions, and was well-poised to take over the strike. It is not clear how or why the AWP became involved in the Auto-Lite strike. But by the end of April, its leaders (Budenz in particular) were deeply involved in planning strike strategy.

The AWP's first step was to ring the Auto-Lite plant with thousands of unemployed workers, effectively sealing off the grounds.

Electric Auto-Lite sought a court injunction prohibiting any pickets in front of its plant. Court of Common Pleas Judge Roy R. Stuart issued an injunction limiting the number of union and LCUL pickets to 25 at each entrance to the two-building plant.

Budenz subsequently instructed the local leaders of the AWP to defy Judge Stuart's injunction. On May 5, 1934, Pollock and Selander wrote a letter to Stuart declaring that the Lucas County Unemployed League would "deliberately and specifically violate the injunction enjoining us from sympathetically picketing peacefully in support of the striking auto workers' federal union."

On May 7, picketing resumed outside the Auto-Lite plant. At first, there were only four pickets. Selander and Pollock were arrested for contempt of court the same day, but released on May 8 with suspended sentences. The day of their release, the picket line returned—although this time nearly 40 picketers marched before the plant gates. On May 11, Selander, Pollock and all the picketers were arrested. Judge Stuart attempted to try the group, and noted corporate attorney Edward Lamb argued the case for the defendants. During the short trial, the League continued to put 30 to 60 picketers on the line every day, and the police continued to arrest large numbers of them. The League, meanwhile, packed the courtroom with hundreds of supporters, who cheered, sang and disrupted the trial. Stuart finally released the entire group of arrestees after a few days without issuing a decision.

As Judge Stuart attempted to try the picketers, the Auto-Lite company decided to break the strike. The firm hired approximately 1,500 strikebreakers as replacement workers to re-open the plant and start production. The company also hired armed guards to protect the replacement workers, and the Lucas County sheriff's department deputized large numbers of special deputies (paid for by Auto-Lite) to assist the company's private security personnel. Additionally, Auto-Lite purchased $11,000 worth of tear and vomit gas munitions and stored them in the plant.

When the AWP learned about the strikebreakers, it engaged in mass picketing. On May 21, Budenz spoke to a group of 1,000 pickets in front of the plant. The next day, the pickets swelled to 4,000. By the morning of May 23, the number of picketers rose to 6,000. City and company officials began to worry that the Toledo police, who were disaffected because of wage cuts and layoffs, were beginning to sympathize with the strikers and were no longer reliable.

== The "Battle of Toledo" ==
On the afternoon of Wednesday, May 23, the sheriff of Lucas County decided to take action against the picketers. In front of a crowd which now numbered nearly 10,000, sheriff's deputies arrested Budenz and four picketers. As the five were taken to jail, a deputy began beating an elderly man.

Infuriated, the crowd began hurling stones, bricks and bottles at the sheriff's deputies. A fire hose was turned on the crowd, but the mob seized it and turned the hose back on the deputies. Many deputies fled inside the plant gates, and Auto-Lite managers barricaded the plant doors and turned off the lights. The deputies gathered on the roof and began shooting tear gas bombs into the crowd. So much tear and vomit gas was used that not even the police could enter the riot zone. The strikers retaliated by hurling bricks and stones through the plant's windows for seven hours. The strikers overturned cars in the parking lot and set them ablaze. The inner tubes of car tires were turned into improvised slingshots, and bricks and stones launched at the building. Burning refuse was thrown into the open door of the plant's shipping department, setting it on fire. In the early evening, the strikers attempted to break into the plant. Police fired shots at the legs of rioters to try to stop them. The gunfire was ineffective, and only one person was (slightly) wounded. Hand-to-hand fighting broke out as the strikers broke into the plant. They were repelled, but tried twice more to break into the facility before they gave up late in the evening. More than 20 people were reported injured during the melee. Auto-Lite president Clement O. Miniger was so alarmed by the violence that he ringed his home with a cordon of armed guards.

At 5:30 a.m. on Thursday, May 24, 900 Ohio National Guardsmen, some of them high-school-aged teenage boys, arrived in a light rain. The troops included eight rifle companies, three machine-gun companies and a medical unit. The troops cleared a path through the picket line, and the sheriff's deputies, private security guards and replacement workers were able to leave the plant.

Later that morning, Judge Stuart issued a new injunction banning all picketing in front of the Auto-Lite plant, but the picketers ignored the order.

During the afternoon of May 24, Charles Phelps Taft II, son of the former president, was sent to Toledo by President Roosevelt to act as a special mediator in the dispute. AFL president William Green sent an AFL organizer to the city as well to help the local union leadership bring the situation under control.

During the late afternoon and early evening of May 24, a huge crowd of about 6,000 people gathered again in front of the Auto-Lite plant. Around 10 p.m., the crowd began taunting the soldiers and tossing bottles at them. The militia retaliated by launching a particularly strong form of tear gas into the crowd. The crowd picked up the gas bombs and threw them back. For two hours, the gas barrage continued. Finally, the crowd surged back toward the plant gates. The National Guardsmen charged with bayonets, forcing the crowd back. Again the crowd advanced. The soldiers fired into the air with no effect, then fired into the crowd—killing 27-year-old Frank Hubay (shot four times) and 20-year-old Steve Cyigon. Neither was an Auto-Lite worker, but had joined the crowd out of sympathy for the strikers. At least 15 others also received bullet wounds, while 10 Guardsmen were treated after being hit by bricks.

A running battle occurred throughout the night between National Guard troops and picketers in a six-block area surrounding the plant. A smaller crowd rushed the troops again a short time after Hubay and Cyigon's deaths, and two more picketers were injured by gunfire. A company of troops was sent to guard the Bingham Tool and Die plant, a squad of sheriff's deputies dispatched to protect the Logan Gear factory, and another 400 National Guardsmen ordered to the area. Nearly two dozen picketers and troopers were injured by hurled missiles during the night. The total number of troops now in Toledo was 1,350, the largest peacetime military build-up in Ohio history.

In the early morning hours of Friday, May 25, Auto-Lite officials agreed to keep the plant closed in an attempt to forestall further violence.

Also on May 25, Clement Miniger was arrested after local residents swore out complaints that he had created a public nuisance by allowing his security guards to bomb the neighborhood with tear gas. Louis Budenz, too, was arrested—again on contempt of court charges. Meanwhile, violence continued around the Auto-Lite plant. Furious local citizens accosted National Guard troops, demanding that they stop gassing the city. Twice during the day, troops fired volleys into the air to drive picketers away from the plant. A trooper was shot in the thigh, and several picketers were severely injured by flying gas bombs and during bayonet charges. In the early evening, when the National Guard ran out of tear gas bombs, they began throwing bricks, stones and bottles back at the crowd to keep it away.

Tensions worsened during the day. The AFL's Committee of 23 announced that 51 of the city's 103 unions had voted to support a general strike.

That evening, local union members voted down a proposal to submit all grievances to the Automobile Labor Board for mediation. The plan had been offered by Auto-Lite officials the day before and endorsed by Taft. But the plan would have deprived the union of its most potent weapon (the closed plant and thousands of picketing supporters) and forced the union to accept proportional representation. Union members refused to accept either outcome. Taft suggested submitting all grievances to the National Labor Board instead, but union members rejected that proposal as well.

On Saturday, May 26, the violence began to die down somewhat. Troopers began arresting hundreds of people, most of whom paid a small bond and won release later the same day. Large crowds continued to gather in front of the Auto-Lite plant and hurl missiles at the troops, but the National Guard was able to maintain order during daylight hours without resorting to large-scale gas bombing. During the day, Ted Selander was arrested by the National Guard and held incommunicado. Despite the pleas of Muste and Lamb, Taft refused to use his influence to have Selander freed or his whereabouts revealed. With two of the AWP's three local leaders in jail, the AWP was unable to mobilize as many picketers as before. Although a crowd of 5,000 gathered in the early evening, the National Guard was able to disperse the mob after heavily gassing the six-block neighborhood.

That morning, Taft led a round of negotiations involving the union, officials of all three companies, and National Guard leaders. Union officials demanded that the plants remain closed during arbitration and that troops be withdrawn. But at Taft's urging, they agreed to lower their wage demands to a 10 percent increase.

On Sunday, May 27, almost all picketing and rioting within the now eight-block-wide zone surrounding the Auto-Lite plant ceased.

== End of the strike ==
Over the next two weeks, Taft continued his negotiations. On May 28, the union agreed to submit their grievances to mediation, but Auto-Lite officials refused these terms. A company union calling itself the Auto-Lite Council injected itself into the negotiations, demanding that all replacement workers be permitted to keep their jobs. In contrast, the union demanded that all strikebreakers be fired. Meanwhile, Judge Stuart began processing hundreds of contempt of court cases associated with the strike. Arthur Garfield Hays, general counsel for the American Civil Liberties Union, traveled to Toledo and represented nearly all those who came before Judge Stuart.

On May 29, tensions worsened again. The Toledo Central Labor Council continued to plan for a general strike. By now, 68 of the 103 unions had voted to support a general strike, and the council was seeking a vote of all its member unions on Thursday, May 31. Auto-Lite executives, too, were busy. Miniger met with Governor George White and demanded that White re-open the plant using the National Guard. White refused, but quietly began drawing up contingency plans to declare martial law. Negotiations remained deadlocked, and Taft began communicating with United States Secretary of Labor Frances Perkins to seek federal support (including personal intervention by Roosevelt).

On May 31, the Toledo Central Labor Council asked President Roosevelt to intervene to avert a general strike. The CLC placed the final decision to hold a general strike in the hands of the Committee of 23, with a decision to be rendered on June 2. By this time, 85 of the CLC's member unions had pledged to support the general strike (with one union dissenting and another reconsidering its previous decision to support the general strike). The same day, leaders of FLU 18384 met with Governor White and presented their case. The media reported that both Labor Secretary Perkins and AFL president Green might come to Toledo to help end the strike. Despite no resolution to the strike, Toledo remained peaceful. Governor White had begun withdrawing National Guard troops a few days earlier, and by May 31 only 250 remained.

On June 1, the prospects of a general strike greatly subsided. A local affiliate of the International Brotherhood of Electrical Workers, which had threatened to strike on June 2, reached a tentative agreement for a 20 percent wage increase. The local approved the pact the same day. As Taft secured final agreement on the electrical workers' contract, he also kept all sides in the Auto-Lite strike negotiating round the clock in the same hotel. That night, a torchlight parade of 20,000 union members and their supporters peacefully marched through Toledo.

Auto-Lite and FLU 18384 reached a tentative agreement settling the strike on June 2, 1934. The union won a 5 percent wage increase, and a minimum wage of 35 cents an hour. The union also won recognition (effectively freezing out the company union), provisions for arbitration of grievances and wage demands, and a system of re-employment which favored (respectively) workers who had crossed the picket line, workers who struck, and replacement workers. Although Muste and Budenz advocated that the union reject the agreement, workers ratified it on June 3.

Governor White withdrew the final National Guard troops on June 5, 1934.

Toledo remained tense, however. When union officials complained on June 5 that not all striking workers had been rehired, Taft urged Auto-Lite officials to re-employ them immediately (although that was not required under the agreement). Auto-Lite did so on June 6, and a final crisis was averted. Instead of a general strike beginning on Friday, June 9, the Toledo CLC held a victory rally at which 20,000 people paraded.

== Aftermath ==
The victory by FLU 18384 led to widespread unionization in Toledo. In 1935, the auto workers would successfully strike Chevrolet, leading the unionization of that automaker and the first successful steps in organizing workers in automobile manufacturing. Toledo remains one of the most unionized cities in the United States as of 2007.

The strike also led to the creation of the Toledo Industrial Peace Board. Now called the Labor-Management-Citizens Committee, the Industrial Peace Board became a national model for strike resolution in the post-World War II period.

In 1935, FLU 18384 became United Auto Workers Local 12.

== Strike memorial ==
The Auto-Lite Plant closed in 1962, and the plant and property were eventually deeded to the city of Toledo. The city did nothing with the structure, and the abandoned plant became an eyesore. After much pressure from local citizens to tear down the plant, the former Auto-Lite facility was demolished on August 30, 1999, and the site turned into a park.

On May 12, 2001, the city of Toledo dedicated a memorial on the site to commemorate the 1934 strike. The site was turned into a new city park, named Union Memorial Park. Seattle sculptor Hai Ying Wu designed two life-sized bronze statues of picketers, which were placed on a plaza made of bricks salvaged from the Auto-Lite plant. A nearby doorway of concrete and brick, also salvaged from the plant, serves as a gateway to the plaza. The memorial cost $225,000.

== Cultural references ==
The Soledad Brothers' song "Mean Ol' Toledo" recounts the story of the Electric Auto-Lite strike of 1934.

== See also ==
- List of incidents of civil unrest in the United States
- Murder of workers in labor disputes in the United States
