= Short's Hotel =

- U.S. National Register of Historic Places
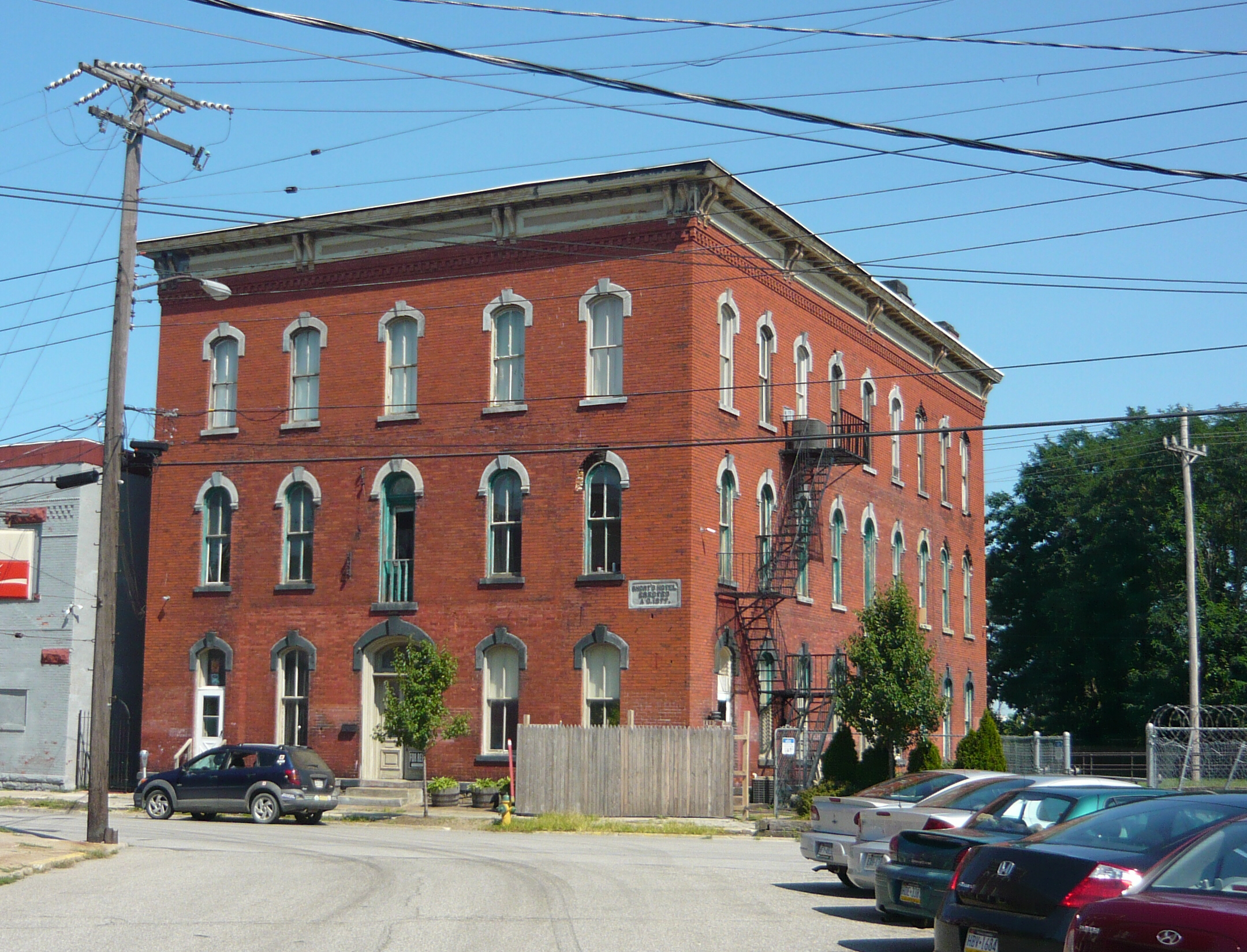
- Shorts Hotel, August 2008

- Location within Pennsylvania Location within the United States
- Location: 90 S. Pearl St., North East, Pennsylvania
- Coordinates: 42°12′38″N 79°50′14″W
- Area: 0.4 acres (0.16 ha)
- Built: 1877
- Architectural style: Italianate
- NRHP reference No.: 83002243
- Added to NRHP: August 25, 1983

Short's Hotel, also known as the Palace Hotel, is a historic hotel located at North East, Erie County, Pennsylvania. It was built in 1877, and is a three-story, five bay by nine bay, brick building in the Italianate style. It features double-hung windows with semi-circular or segmental arch heads and a three-part entablature at the top of the building.

It was added to the National Register of Historic Places in 1983.
