= Charles Fehrenbach (priest) =

Charles Fehrenbach (May 17, 1909, Philadelphia, Pennsylvania – February 6, 2006 Saratoga Springs, New York) was a Redemptorist priest who was an author, translator and host of a local religious radio program in the Philadelphia area. He obtained a Ph.D. in German from the Catholic University of America after he was ordained in Esopus, New York, on June 23, 1935. He worked at St. Mary's Seminary in North East, Pennsylvania as registrar from 1942 to 1959; during this period he became known as an outstanding spiritual director and confessor, conducting retreats and Lenten missions in addition to his work at the seminary.

He translated several critical editions of works ("The Glories of Mary" and "The Passion and Death of Jesus Christ") by the founder of the Redemptorists, St. Alphonsus Liguori, and also helped prepare an analytical index of the Redemptorist Constitution and Statutes. Following his departure from St. Mary's, he worked at a series of parishes; his longest assignment was at St. Peter's in Philadelphia, where he served from 1978 to 1995, before retiring to the St. John Neumann Home in Saratoga Springs, New York, where he was residing when he died. At the time of his death, he was the oldest Redemptorist in the Maryland Province.

At St. Peter's, which is also the National Shrine of St. John Neumann, the Redemptorist bishop who had been canonized in 1977, Fr. Fehrenbach greeted tour groups, said Mass and heard confessions for the pilgrims as well as for parishioners. During this period, he also hosted a daily fifteen-minute program on station WTMR during which the Rosary was recited. Father Fehrenbach also appeared in episode 14 of season 5 of the TV series Unsolved Mysteries. He can be seen giving a tour of the Shrine of St. John Neumann between 12 and 13 minutes into the episode.

Fr. Fehrenbach was also the author of the book Mary Day by Day which is a devotional booklet containing meditations for each day of the year with quotes from scriptures and the writing of saints on Mary; the book was published by the Catholic Book Publishing Company.
