= Augustus Granville Dill =

American historian

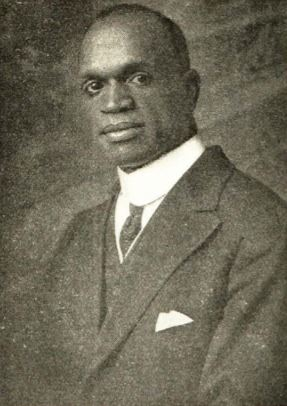

Augustus Granville Dill (November 30, 1882 – March 8, 1956) was an American sociologist, civil rights and labor organizer and activist, musician, member of the NAACP and academic. During his career in academia he made early and major contributions to race relations in labor.

== Early life and education ==
Augustus Granville Dill was born in Portsmouth, Ohio. His parents were John Dill and Elizabeth Jackson. He received his B.A. from Atlanta University in 1906, received a second B.A. from Harvard in 1908, and received his M.A. in 1909 from Harvard.

While studying for his master's degree at Harvard, he came under the mentorship of W. E. B. Du Bois. He was a member of the NAACP, and his résumé is decorated with many different jobs, from business manager of The Crisis and The Brownies' Book, to curator, and to musician (pianist). The Brownies' Book was a children's book that helped African-American children gain a better self-image.

== Early works ==
As a student of W. E. B. Du Bois, Granville was the joint editor of various scholarly pieces, including "The College-Bred American Negro" (1911), "The Common School and the Negro American" (1912), "The Negro American Artisan" (1912) and "Morals and Manners Among Negro Americans" (1914). "Morals and Manners Among Negro Americans" was a social study based on responses to surveys that were sent out to African-Americans across the country in 1913. It was a means to assess social progress. These works illustrate the racial inequalities present during the early 20th century, when Jim Crow laws were enforced in the United States.

== Role in the Harlem Renaissance ==
The Crisis was a magazine written by African Americans during the time of the Harlem Renaissance. It had a big impact on the Harlem Renaissance. Dill was an acquaintance of Langston Hughes, a well known poet who submitted several poems to The Crisis.

As a result of his arrest by vice-squad detectives for homosexual activity in a public restroom in New York City in 1928, Dill was fired from The Crisis by W.E.B. Du Bois and largely withdrew from literary activities. He earned his living thereafter by playing piano and giving music lessons. In his autobiography Dubois later stated that he regretted his decision to cut his ties with Dill:

"I had before that time no conception of homosexuality. I had never understood the tragedy of an Oscar Wilde. I dismissed my co-worker [Augustus Dill] forthwith, and spent heavy days regretting my act."

== Race labor contribution ==
A significant contribution made by Granville to labor was The Negro American Artisan, written in part with W. E. B. Du Bois and Florence Kelley. The Negro American Artisan was an Atlanta University-sponsored sociological study covered in different Journal issues conducted from 1902 to 1912. The issues are divided into sections. The study is cast as one of "the trained Negro laborer, his education, opportunity, wages and work". The 31st section of the 1912 edition is entitled "The Negro and Organized Labor", wherein the two points of "(1) The attitude of Negro workmen toward labor organizations. (2) The attitude of labor organizations toward Negro Laborers" are assessed. The authors gathered information on various unions that had by then accepted African Americans, such as the United Mine Workers of America; they also examined exclusively black unions such as The American Brotherhood of Cement Workers and unions from which blacks were entirely excluded, such as Order of Railway Conductors of America.

The rest of the section notes the attitudes of different states on African Americans in unions. In the next section the attitude of the African American is assessed. Some African Americans believed in unions; others did not. The study brings to light the racial inequalities faced by the African American labor force from 1902 to 1912.

== Talented tenth ==
After Reconstruction, the two prevailing schools of thought regarding education and labor of the black American were those espoused by W. E. B. Du Bois and Booker T. Washington. These two scholars had opposing ideas on how the African American should fight for equality. Washington believed in an industrial education and in putting aside concerns about civil rights until after economic advancement had been achieved, while Du Bois believed in a classical education, and envisioned a future wherein educated African Americans he called the "talented tenth" would lead the African American out of inequality. Granville is an example of the "talented tenth" Du Bois believed in. His contributions were mostly made by organizing rather than being a part of labor unions themselves. Dill's efforts also signify the African American contribution to labor. With his education, he advanced in the ranks of the NAACP as editor of The Crisis. He helped gain recognition for the racial inequalities present in employment and labor.

== Personal life and death ==
Dill never married. He died at age 73 in Louisville, Kentucky, where he had moved in 1951 to live with his widowed sister.
