= Francis Newton Thorpe =

American legal scholar, historian, and political scientist (1857–1926)

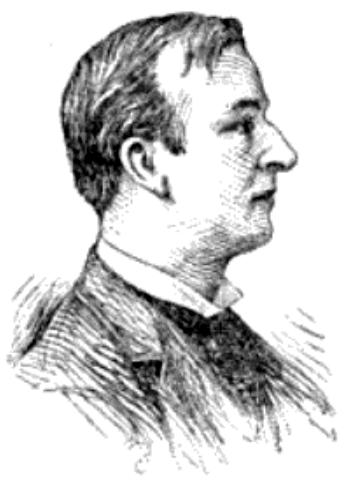
- Born: April 16, 1857; Swampscott, Massachusetts
- Died: May 8, 1926 (aged 69); Pittsburgh, Pennsylvania
- Education: Syracuse University; University of Pennsylvania
- Occupation: Legal scholar
- Employer: University of Pennsylvania
- Spouse: Marion Haywood Shreve (m. 1895)

Francis Newton Thorpe (1857–1926) was an American legal scholar, historian, political scientist, and Professor of Constitutional History at the University of Pennsylvania.

== Biography ==
Francis Newton Thorpe was born in the town of Swampscott, Massachusetts on April 16, 1857. He was descended from early settlers of Plymouth, MA and Boston, MA and Litchfield and Norwich, Connecticut. He received his primary education at North East Academy and his high school education at Lake Shore Seminary. He attended Syracuse University and pursued graduate studies at the University of Pennsylvania, where, at the age of 28, he became a University Fellow, holding the title of Professor of American Constitutional History from 1885 to 1898.

An active member of the Pennsylvania Historical Society and leading member of the American Historical Association, Thorpe was admitted to the Pennsylvania bar in 1885. He married Marion Haywood Shreve on July 4, 1895. Describing the scholar's personal life, the Book News added that "In addition to his varied literary interests Mr. Thorpe, like many other sane people is fond of outdoor life and spends half of the year at his summer home... entertaining his friends... on a beautiful estate... called Indian Arrow Vineyards, on Lake Erie." Thorpe also owned a winter home in Mount Holly, NJ.

He died in Pittsburgh on May 8, 1926.

== State constitutions ==
Thorpe's scholarship on state constitutions remains some of the most influential and foundational work in the field of state constitutional development. The current NBER/Maryland State Constitutions Project relied heavily on Thorpe's The Federal and State Constitutions, Colonial Charters, and the Organic Laws of the State, Territories, and Colonies; Now or heretofore Forming the United States of America. (Gov't Printing Office. Washington, D.C. 1909).

== Publications ==
Thorpe served as chief editor of the History of North America Project conducted by the University of Pennsylvania and wrote or edited several scholarly books:

- The Constitutional History of the American People; A (State) Constitutional History of the American People 1776–1850
- A (social and political) History of the American People
- A School History of the United States
- The Government of the People of the United States
- A Course in Civil Government; Benjamin Franklin and the University of Pennsylvania
- The Life of William Pepper Provost of the University of Pennsylvania
- The Spoils of Empire
- The Divining Rod
- A Short Constitutional History of the United States
- The Civil war: the national view
- The Federal and State constitutions: colonial charters, and other organic laws of the states, territories, and colonies now or heretofore forming the United States of America
- The Constitutional History of the United States: 1765–1788
- The Louisiana purchase and the westward movement (coauthor)

In addition to his scholarly work, Thorpe also contributed to Harper's Magazine.
