= Damon Packard =

American filmmaker

- Born: May 4, 1967 (age 59); Akron, Ohio
- Occupations: Film director, actor

Damon Packard (born May 4, 1967) is an American underground film director and actor. He currently lives and works in Los Angeles, California.

== Biography ==
=== Early life ===
Born in Akron, Ohio, Packard's mother, actress Frances Pollock, was the daughter of long-time trade union leader Sam Pollock.

=== Career ===
Packard first became seriously involved with film at the age of 11. Packard spent his teens and twenties working on experimental shorts while supporting himself variously as a movie theater usher, security specialist and wrist-watch salesman. His early Super 8 efforts included The Afterlife and Amazing Stories (1982–84), starring his friend/collaborator Paul Trainor, son of producer/casting director Chris Trainor, who was partners with Miles O'Keeffe known for films such as Ator, The Blade Master, and Lone Runner. His first notable effort was Dawn of an Evil Millennium (1988) which he partly produced as a 30-minute short for a film class and featured Miles O'Keeffe in small role. This was followed by other shorts such as Apple (1992), an elfquest-inspired fantasy film made in Hawaii while living in a tent for two years. In 1999, he made The Early 70's Horror Trailer, which included an early appearance by independent film actress Rachel Galvin.

After struggling for years to complete films out of pocket, living in cars and tents, Packard received a large inheritance when a relative died. He spent the inheritance on Reflections of Evil (2002), a long treatise on contemporary American paranoia. The film featured Packard himself as an obese, overwrought watch salesman. Packard pressed 23,000 DVD copies of the film and made them available for free. He also sent thousands of them to celebrities, whose reactions were recorded on his website. In the January/February 2006 issue of Film Comment, Reflections of Evil made the Editor's List for Best of 2005.

His Reflections spoof of a young Steven Spielberg, a director he claimed to admire, was matched by his later assault on George Lucas in Packard's film The Untitled Star Wars Mockumentary (2003). The film intercut actual footage of Lucas with staged shots of disgruntled Lucasfilm employees.

Packard remains relatively obscure to the public. He is known for his sharp and highly pessimistic view of the movie business, often commenting on how directors have no control of their work and that artistic vision is sacrificed for profit. He also claims that creativity in film largely vanished after the end of the 1970s. Nevertheless, Packard says he admires the recent work of Lars Von Trier and Alexander Sokurov among others.

In May 2007, Packard completed SpaceDisco One. SpaceDisco One was screened at the New York Film Festival on October 6, 2007, and was also selected for the Hollywood Film Festival, the Lausanne Fest Switzerland, Lincoln Film Center in New York City, Berkeley Fest, Tulsa Overground, The Dark Room San Francisco, Il Corral L.A., Union Gallery London and many others through 2007.

As of May 2009 Packard completed his latest, Tales of the Valley of the Wind, based on Hayao Miyazaki's Nausicaa of the Valley of the Wind. At press time, the film was screened at the 2009 Antimatter Fest in Victoria, BC, in addition to a 4-week show at Union Gallery in London.

In 2011, Packard began work on his long-gestating feature Foxfur, about a young girl involved with aliens from the Billy Meier contacts. Foxfur premiered at the Egyptian Theater in Hollywood on July 21, 2012.

In 2014, Packard made John Carpenter's Corpse for Severin Films, which will be released as part of a feature called Betamax".

In late 2014, Packard began working on a new feature film then known as The Untitled Yuppie Fear Thriller. It premiered at the Egyptian Theater in Hollywood on June 1, 2018, using the alternate titles Fatal Pulse and Night Pulse.

Packard often collaborates with actor Khris Kaneff on popular YouTube mini-films. Among these titles are Khrujo, Khreverse and the 2009 Packard-Kaneff Halloween Special.

== Selected filmography ==
=== Actor ===
- Dawn of an Evil Millennium (1988)
- Reflections of Evil (2002)
- Mock Up on Mu (2008)
- Dozers (2008)
- Hallelujah! Gorilla Revival (2008) (watch)
- The Theatre Bizarre (2011)

=== Director ===
- Amazing Stories (1983)
- The Afterlife (1984)
- Dawn of an Evil Millennium (1988)
- Apple (1992)
- The Early 70's Horror Trailer (1999)
- Reflections of Evil (2002)
- The Untitled Star Wars Mockumentary (2003)
- Lost in the Thinking (2005)
- SpaceDisco One (2007)
- Tales of the Valley of the Wind (2009)
- Foxfur (2012)
- John Carpenter's Corpse (2014)
- Fatal Pulse (2018)
