= Plum Bun =

1928 novel by Jessie Redmon Fauset

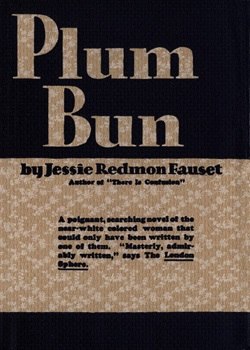
- First edition
- Author: Jessie Redmon Fauset
- Language: English
- Genre: Novel
- Publisher: Frederick A. Stokes
- Publication date: 1929
- Publication place: United States
- Media type: Print (hardback & paperback)
- Text: Plum Bun at Wikisource

Plum Bun: A Novel Without a Moral is a novel by Jessie Redmon Fauset first published in 1928. Written by an African-American woman who, during the 1920s, was the literary editor of The Crisis, it is often seen as an important contribution to the Harlem Renaissance.

== Synopsis ==
Overtly conventional through its employment of elements and techniques of traditional genres such as the romance or the fairy tale, Plum Bun at the same time transgresses these genres by its depiction, and critique, of racism, sexism and capitalism. The heroine, a young, light-skinned African-American woman called Angela Murray, leaves behind her past and passes for white in order to be able to attain fulfilment in life. Only after she has lived among white Americans does she find out that crossing the racial barrier is not enough for a woman like herself to realize her full potential. The detailed description of her coming of age makes Plum Bun a classic Bildungsroman.

== Understanding Plum Bun's title ==
Plum Bun, Fauset's second novel, was difficult to place; her first publisher Boni & Liveright, declined to publish it. Her agency, Brandt & Brandt eventually placed the book at the British publisher Charles Elkin Matthews in 1928, and Frederick A. Stokes published the US edition in 1929. The title, Plum Bun, illustrates some of the forces which drive the novel's main character Angela Murray. The novel's epigraph quotes the nursery rhyme from which the title is taken: "To market, to market / to buy a plum bun / Home again, home again / Market is done". A plum bun itself, which may be similar to the English Chelsea Roll and the American Cinnamon Roll, is a sweet pastry made of white flour, in which deeply colored currants, raisins, or prunes (plums) are baked. The use of the term "plum bun" is also a sexual innuendo as a plum bun can also be read as "an attractive piece".

Angela must come to grips with her colored and white racial heritage, as well as with her femininity (stereotypically seen as sweetness), before she achieves psychological wholeness. Although African-American women were typed in popular song as "a little brown sugar" or a "jellyroll", Angela had to cease thinking of herself as a purveyor of feminine sweetness for sale, and instead step into new roles with inherent value.

== Autobiographical elements ==
The novel's plot and characters include many autobiographical elements. In Fauset's actual family was part of the Philadelphia black middle class, and although well-respected and well-connected in the African-American community, they were prohibited from public places such as hospitals, restaurants and stores by widely accepted Jim Crow policies. Other autobiographical elements include growing up in a suburb of Philadelphia, being the only African-American student in a white school, and discovering Philadelphia's racist policies for hiring public school teachers (a black teacher could not teach white students). Fauset, like her main characters, moved to Harlem during the peak of the Harlem Renaissance (in 1919) and heard W. E. B. du Bois (in the novel he is named Van Meier) speak.

== Plot ==
The novel's plot concerns two sisters, Virginia and Angela Murray, who grow up in Philadelphia in a home rich with African-American culture. Angela, like her mother Mattie, is light skinned and able to “pass” in white society, while Virginia and her father Junius's darker complexion places them on the other side of the color line. Virginia grows up refusing to bow to racist pressures; rather she accepts who she is. Angela, on the other hand, tries repeatedly to gain acceptance by assuming a white mask, but each time it seems that success and friendship are hers, her ethnicity is exposed and she is stripped of everything she cares about.

The deaths of her parents and the racism of Philadelphia society cause Angela to leave for New York City, where she decides to fully hide her African-American heritage. She gains acceptance in an elite artistic circle perhaps inspired by the 1920s Greenwich Village avant-garde. She begins a romantic relationship with Roger, a young white man who seems to move among New York's "Four Hundred", the social elite. Their relationship, however, is based in several deceptions. In one of the novel's most important scenes, Angela's sister is newly arrived at Pennsylvania Station from Philadelphia. Angela, who has come to the station to meet her sister, sees her lover. Aware that his racism will cause him to reject her, she brushes by her darker-complected sister, leaving her standing alone in the crowd. Angela's and Roger's deceptions of each other and of themselves lie also in their use of each other for personal gain: Angela seeks Roger's financial comfort; Roger seeks the convenience of sex without having to introduce his new find to his father, whose deep concern is for his future daughter-in-law's pedigree. Roger's abandonment of Angela, the unmasking, to Angela, of his solely sexual intentions, and the mistreatment of Miss Powell, a young artist of African-American heritage, lead Angela to reveal her racial heritage and lose her standing with several of her acquaintances. However, true friends and her sister urge her to travel to Paris to become an artist, and Anthony, a fellow art school classmate of mixed heritage who watched his father die under the hands of a racist mob in the South, declares his love for Angela. It seems at the end, Anthony and Angela may come to terms with America's racist past and their own brighter future.

The subtitle of the book, A Novel without a Moral, can be understood as follows: once Angela leaves Philadelphia for New York and a traditional African-American home for life on her own, her morality is no longer clearly defined for her. The “moral to the story” is slowly created for the reader and for the main characters as Angela learns and understands the life lessons that New York affords her.

== Other novels of passing and the color line ==
- Nella Larsen's novel Passing, published in the same year, has a very similar plot: a light-skinned African-American woman pretends to be white and becomes involved with a white supremacist.
- In her novel Joy, set two generations later, Marsha Hunt's eponymous heroine, herself too dark-skinned to pass for white, only associates with white people because she believes that they are superior and that she will find fulfillment in life that way.
- Another passing narrative is Philip Roth's novel The Human Stain, where a light-skinned man passes in order to be able to join the army during World War II and goes on to live the rest of his life as a Jewish professor.
- Erskine Caldwell's short story "Saturday Afternoon" depicts a lynching in very much the same way as the story Anthony Cross tells about his father's violent death in Georgia.
