= North East Historic District =

Historic district in Pennsylvania, United States

- U.S. National Register of Historic Places
- U.S. Historic district
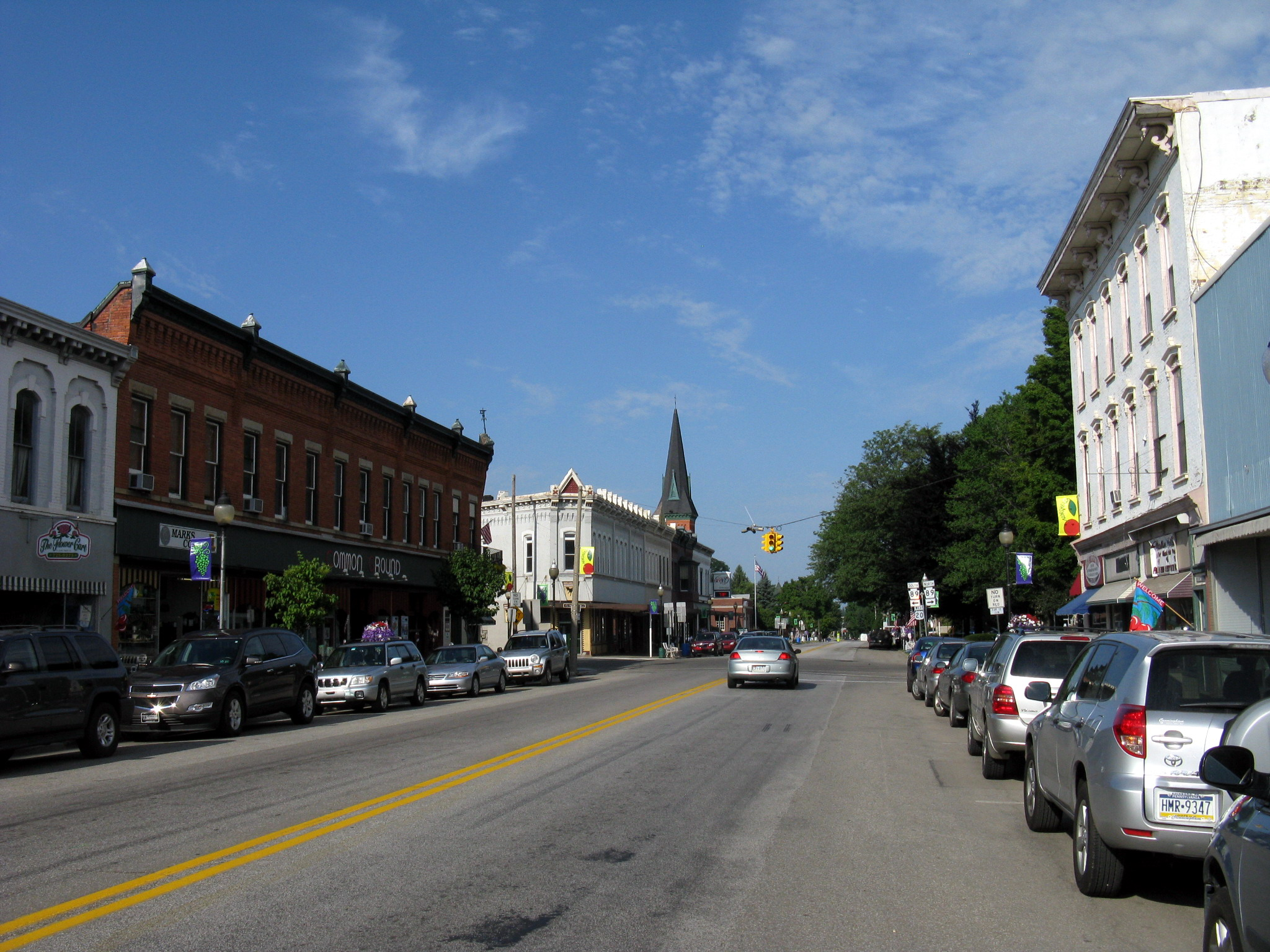
- Main Street, North East Historic District, July 2009

- Location within Pennsylvania Location within the United States
- Location: Roughly bounded by Division, N. Lake, Eagle, N. Pearl, and Gibson Sts., North East, Pennsylvania
- Coordinates: 42°12′56″N 79°50′15″W
- Area: 56 acres (23 ha)
- Built: 1884
- Architect: Multiple
- Architectural style: Greek Revival, Queen Anne, Italianate
- NRHP reference No.: 90000414
- Added to NRHP: March 9, 1990

The North East Historic District is a national historic district that is located in North East, Erie County, Pennsylvania.

It was added to the National Register of Historic Places in 1990.

== History and architectural features ==
This district encompasses 114 contributing buildings that are located in the central business district and surrounding residential areas of North East, and includes commercial, residential, institutional, and religious structures. The buildings were built from the mid-nineteenth to early-twentieth centuries and were designed in a variety of popular architectural styles, including Greek Revival, Queen Anne, and Italianate. Located at the center of the district is Gibson Park. Notable non-residential buildings include commercial buildings along East and West Main Street and South Lake Street, the Concord Hotel, the Crescent Hose Company, the Baptist Church, the Presbyterian Church, the Methodist Church, two main buildings of St. Mary's Seminary, the McCord Memorial Library (1916), and the Heard Memorial School.
