= Jessie R. Fauset =

American writer, poet, and educator (1882–1961)

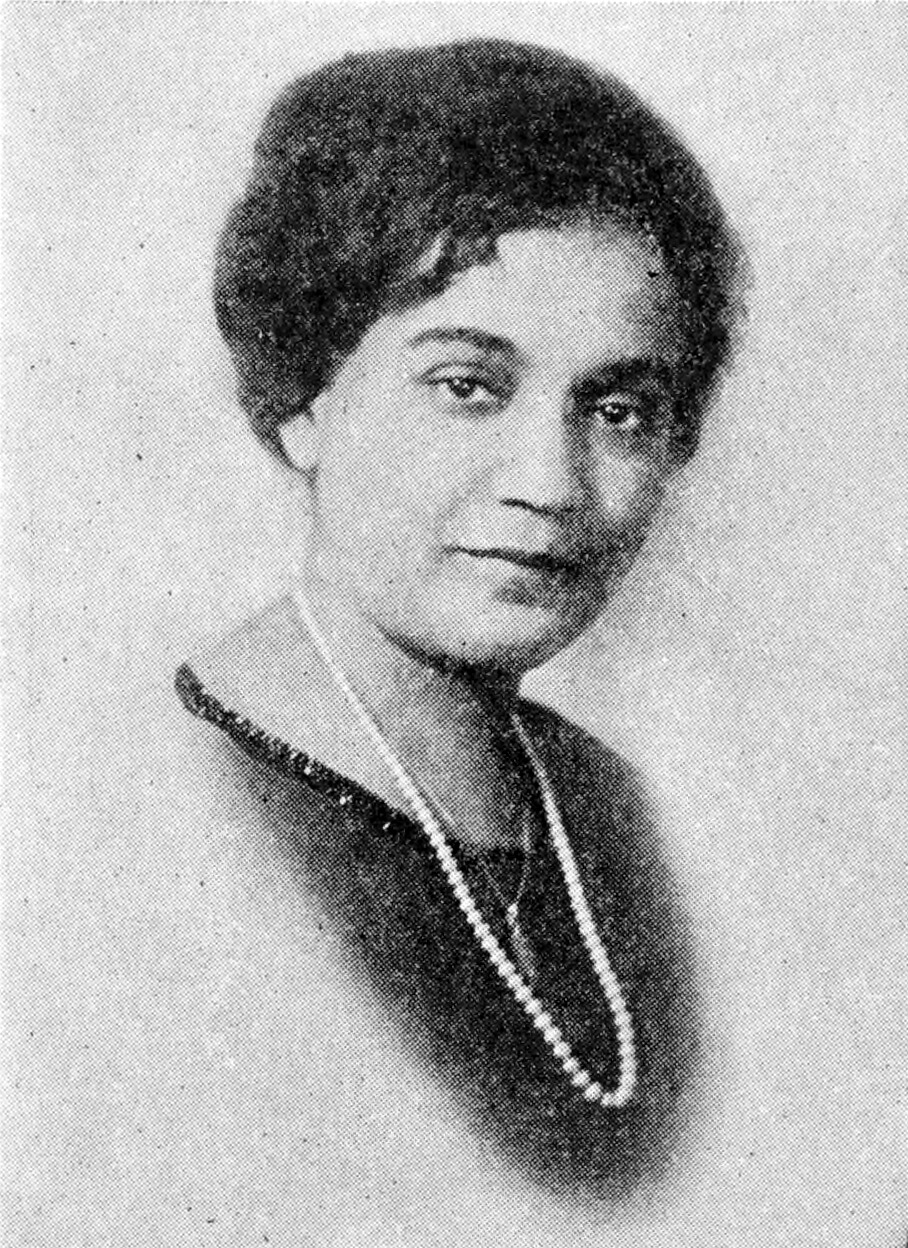
- Fauset in a 1921 publication
- Born: Jessie Redmona Fauset; April 27, 1882; Fredericksville (now Lawnside), Camden County, New Jersey, U.S.
- Died: April 30, 1961 (aged 79); Philadelphia, Pennsylvania, U.S.
- Education: Cornell University
- Occupations: Poet, essayist, novelist, editor, and educator
- Notable work: Plum Bun: A Novel Without a Moral (1928)

Jessie Redmon Fauset (April 27, 1882 – April 30, 1961) was an American editor, poet, essayist, novelist, and educator. Her work helped sculpt African-American literature in the 1920s as she focused on portraying a true image of African-American life and history. Her black fictional characters were working professionals which was an inconceivable concept to American society during this time. Her story lines related to themes of racial discrimination, "passing", and feminism.

From 1919 to 1926, Fauset's position as literary editor of The Crisis, an NAACP magazine, allowed her to contribute to the Harlem Renaissance by promoting literary work that related to the social movements of this era. Through her work as a literary editor and reviewer, she encouraged black writers to represent the African-American community realistically and positively.

Before and after working on The Crisis, she worked for decades as a French teacher in public schools in Washington, DC, and New York City. She published four novels during the 1920s and 1930s, exploring the lives of the black middle class. She also was the editor and co-author of the African-American children's magazine The Brownies' Book.

She is known for discovering and mentoring other African-American writers, including Langston Hughes, Jean Toomer, Countee Cullen, and Claude McKay.

== Life and work ==
She was born Jessie Redmona Fauset (later known as Jessie Redmon Fauset) on April 27, 1882, in Fredericksville, Camden County, Snow Hill Center Township, New Jersey (now known as Lawnside, New Jersey).

She was the seventh child of Redmon Fauset, an African Methodist Episcopal minister, and Annie (née Seamon) Fauset. Jessie's mother died when she was young, and her father remarried. He had three children with his second wife Bella, a white Jewish woman who converted to Christianity. Bella brought three children to the family from her first marriage. Both parents emphasized education for their children. Civil rights activist and anthropologist Arthur Fauset was her half-brother. Her father died when she was young; two of her half-siblings were still under the age of five. She attended the Philadelphia High School for Girls, the city's top academic school. She graduated as valedictorian of her class and likely the school's first African-American graduate. She wanted to study at Bryn Mawr College, and the valedictorian of Girls' High was traditionally awarded a scholarship to the college. However, Bryn Mawr president M. Carey Thomas raised money for Fauset to attend Cornell University instead. Carey Thomas would prevent any black or Jewish students from attending Bryn Mawr during her tenure.

She continued her education at Cornell University in upstate New York, graduating in 1905 with a degree in classical languages. During her time at Cornell University in 1903 through part of 1904, Fauset lived at Sage College. She would win Phi Beta Kappa honors. For many years she was considered to be the first black woman accepted to Phi Beta Kappa society, but later research revealed this was actually Mary Annette Anderson. Fauset later received her master's degree in French from the University of Pennsylvania (1919).

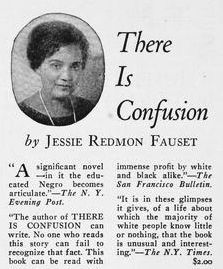
Advertisement for There is Confusion

Following college, Fauset became a teacher at Dunbar High School (then named as M Street High School), the academic high school for black students in Washington, DC, which had a segregated public school system. She taught French and Latin, and went to Paris for the summers to study at la Sorbonne.

In 1919, Fauset left teaching to become the literary editor for The Crisis, founded by W. E. B. Du Bois of the NAACP. She served in that position until 1926. Fauset became a member of the NAACP and represented them in the Pan African Congress in 1921. After her Congress speech, the Delta Sigma Theta sorority made her an honorary member.

In 1926, Fauset left The Crisis and returned to teaching, this time at DeWitt Clinton High School in New York City, where she may have taught a young James Baldwin. She taught in New York City public schools until 1944.

In 1929, when she was 47, Fauset married for the first time, to insurance broker Herbert Harris. They moved from New York City to Montclair, New Jersey, where they led a quieter life. Harris died in 1958. She moved back to Philadelphia with her step-brother, one of Bella's children. Fauset died on April 30, 1961, from heart disease and is interred at Eden Cemetery in Collingdale, Pennsylvania.

== Literary editor at The Crisis ==
Jessie Fauset's time with The Crisis is considered the most prolific literary period of the magazine's run. In July 1918, Fauset became a contributor to The Crisis, sending articles for the "Looking Glass" column from her home in Philadelphia. By the next July, managing editor W. E. B. Du Bois requested she move to New York to become the full-time Literary Editor. By October, she was installed in the Crisis office, where she quickly took over most organizational duties.

As Literary Editor, Fauset fostered the careers of many of the most well-known authors of the Harlem Renaissance, including Countee Cullen, Claude McKay, Jean Toomer, Nella Larsen, Georgia Douglas Johnson, Anne Spencer, George Schuyler, Arna Bontemps, and Langston Hughes. Fauset was the first person to publish Hughes. As editor of The Brownies' Book, the children's magazine of The Crisis, she had included a few of his early poems. In his memoir The Big Sea, Hughes wrote, "Jessie Fauset at The Crisis, Charles Johnson at Opportunity, and Alain Locke in Washington were the people who midwifed the so-called New Negro Literature into being."

Beyond nurturing the careers of other African-American modernist writers, Fauset was also a prolific contributor to both The Crisis and The Brownies' Book. During her time with The Crisis, she contributed poems and short stories, as well as a novella, translations from the French of writings by black authors from Europe and Africa, and a multitude of editorials. She also published accounts of her extensive travels. Notably, Fauset included five essays, including "Dark Algiers the White," detailing her six-month journey with Laura Wheeler Waring to France and Algeria in 1925 and 1926.

After eight years serving as Literary Editor, Fauset found that conflicts between her and Du Bois were taking their toll. In February 1927, she resigned her position. She was listed as a "Contributing Editor" the next month.

After leaving the magazine, Fauset concentrated on writing novels, while supporting herself through teaching. From 1927 to 1944, she taught French at DeWitt Clinton High School in the Bronx, while continuing to publish novels.

== Novels ==
Between 1924 and 1933, Fauset published four novels: There is Confusion (1924), Plum Bun (1928), The Chinaberry Tree (1931), and Comedy, American Style (1933). She believed that T. S. Stribling's novel Birthright, written by a white man about black life, could not fully portray her people. Fauset thought there was a dearth of positive depictions of African-American lives in contemporary literature. She was inspired to portray African-American life both as realistically, and as positively, as possible, and wrote about the middle-class life she knew of as an educated person. At the same time, she worked to explore contemporary issues of identity among African Americans, including issues related to the community's assessment of skin color. Many were of mixed race with some European ancestry.

The Great Migration resulted in many African Americans moving to industrial cities; in some cases, individuals used this change as freedom to try on new identities. Some used partial European ancestry and appearance to pass as white, for temporary convenience or advantage: for instance, to get better service in a store or restaurant, or to gain a job. Others entered white society nearly permanently to take advantage of economic and social opportunities, sometimes leaving darker-skinned relatives behind. This issue was explored by other writers of the Harlem Renaissance in addition to Fauset, who was herself light-skinned and visibly of mixed race. Vashti Crutcher Lewis, in an essay entitled "Mulatto Hegemony in the Novels of Jessie Redmon Fauset", suggests that Fauset's novels illustrate the evidence of a color hierarchy with lighter-skinned blacks enjoying more privilege."

- There is Confusion was widely praised upon release. In the New York Times, Ernest Boyd wrote: "Compared with the ordinary story of negro life Jessie Redmon Fauset's There is Confusion assumes the proportions of an important book; it is well executed, so well, in fact, that no Ku Kluxer could stand it." Alain Locke wrote in The Crisis: "[H]ere in refreshing contrast with the bulk of fiction about the Negro, we have a novel of the educated and aspiring classes." This novel traces the family histories of Joanna Mitchell and Peter Bye, who must each come to terms with their complex racial histories.
- Plum Bun has warranted the most critical attention. It explores the theme of "passing". The mixed-race protagonist, Angela Murray, who has partial European ancestry, passes for white in order to gain some advantages. In the course of the novel, she eventually reclaims her African-American identity.
- The Chinaberry Tree has not received much critical attention. Set in New Jersey, this novel explores the longing for "respectability" among the contemporary African-American middle class. The protagonist Laurentine seeks to overcome her "bad blood" through marriage to a "decent" man. Ultimately, Laurentine must redefine "respectable" as she finds her own sense of identity.
- Comedy, American Style, Fauset's last novel, explores the destructive power of "color mania" among African Americans, some of whom discriminated within the black community on the basis of skin color. The protagonist's mother Olivia brings about the downfall of the other characters due to her own such internalized racism.

== Contemporary reviews ==
Fauset was admired by many literary intellectuals during the 1920s. Her first novel, There is Confusion, was applauded by Alain Locke in the 1924 February issue of the Crisis. Locke felt the novel would "mark an epoch" because he believed it was educated literary material that the educated reader anticipated as it shone light on a higher class of black people rather than the usual "servant" type of character that was portrayed in past literature. In the 1924 June academic journal Opportunity, Howard University professor Montgomery Gregory gave praise to Fauset's work because he felt she made clear of the "better elements" of African-American life "to those who know us only as domestic servants, 'uncles', or criminals". Although Fauset received many positive reviews on her literary work in the 1920s, she also faced negative feedback as well. Her new literary perspective was not received with open arms by everyone because it went against the stereotypical image white Americans made of middle-class African Americans. The first publisher ever to see the There is Confusion manuscript rejected it, saying that "white readers just don’t expect negroes to be like this". Despite the mixed discussion on Fauset's work in the 1920s, by the 1930s people stopped talking about her and she became a forgotten writer. Locke felt that the reason people stopped talking about Fauset was due to a change in the literary scene because of the Great Depression and Second World War.

== Current scholarship ==
It was not until after the 1970s, a period of a feminist movement, that Fauset began to regain praise. In 1981, author Carolyn Wedin Sylvander wrote a book about Fauset, Jessie Redmon Fauset, Black American Writer, which analyses and shows great appreciation of her novels, short stories and poems. Other critics such as Wilbert Jenkins acknowledge Fauset in his 1986 essay "Jessie Fauset: A Modern Apostle of Black Racial Pride" for showing "awareness of African American cultural history" and demonstrating how to celebrate "black identity". Jenkins also argues that Fauset is alongside other early black feminists because in addition to focusing on racial identity, she explores "female consciousness". Fauset is recognized today as an important contributor to the Harlem Renaissance. American and African-American literature professor Ann duCille compares Fauset to other Harlem Renaissance writers such as Nella Larsen for expressing feminism in her literary work.

== Selected works ==
Novels

- There Is Confusion (Boni & Liveright (US), Chapman & Hall (UK), 1924) (ISBN 1-55553-066-4)
- Plum Bun: A Novel Without a Moral (1928) (a further study of the passing phenomenon; ISBN 0-8070-0919-9)
- The Chinaberry Tree: A Novel of American Life (1931) (ISBN 1-55553-207-1)
- Comedy: American Style (1933)

Poems

- "Rondeau." The Crisis. April 1912: 252.
- "La Vie C'est La Vie." The Crisis. July 1922: 124.
- "Dead Fires." Palms. October 1926: 17.
- "'Courage!' He Said." The Crisis. November 1929: 378.

Short stories

- "Emmy." The Crisis. December 1912: 79–87; January 1913: 134–142.
- "My House and a Glimpse of My Life Therein." The Crisis. July 1914: 143–145.
- "Double Trouble." The Crisis. August 1923: 155–159; September 1923: 205–209.

Essays

- "Impressions of the Second Pan-African Congress." The Crisis. November 1921: 12–18.
- "What Europe Thought of the Pan-African Congress." The Crisis. December 1921: 60–69.
- "The Gift of Laughter." In Locke, Alaine. The New Negro: An Interpretation. New York: A. and C. Boni, 1925.
- "Dark Algiers the White." The Crisis. 1925–26 (vol. 29–30): 255–258, 16–22.
