= Mercyhurst North East =

Catholic college in Pennsylvania, U.S.

Coordinates: 42.2201°N 79.8354°W

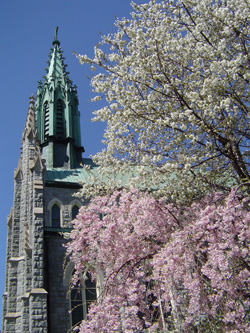
- St. Mary's Chapel at Mercyhurst North East
- Motto: Carpe diem - Seize the day
- Type: Catholic comprehensive
- Active: 1991–2021
- Location: North East, Pennsylvania, U.S.
- Campus: 84 acres (34 ha) campus with 15 buildings
- Colors: Blue, green, white, black
- Nickname: Saints
- Sporting affiliations: National Junior College Athletic Association, Ohio Community College Athletic Conference and Region III Athletics
- Website: northeast.mercyhurst.edu

Mercyhurst North East was a two-year Catholic liberal arts college in North East, Pennsylvania. It was a branch campus of Mercyhurst University.

== History ==
The college was established in 1991 when Mercyhurst College purchased the former St. Mary's College from Redemptorists. It was a property first established as Lake Shore Seminary in 1870. Mercyhurst North East offered one-year certificates and two-year associate degrees in a variety of majors.

As of the 2009–2010 academic year, the school enrolled more than 1,060 students, both resident and commuter. The school featured many athletic teams, including men's and women's basketball, wrestling, lacrosse, cross country, golf, soccer, swimming and diving, baseball and softball.

The school campus closed at the end of the 2020–2021 term, consolidating all programs into the larger Mercyhurst campus in Erie.

== Athletics affiliations ==
Mercyhurst North East competed in 16 National Junior College Athletic Association (NJCAA) sports. Teams were known as the "Saints". The Saints were a member of the Ohio Community College Athletic Conference (OCCAC).

=== NJCAA sports ===
- Baseball
- Men's and women's basketball
- Men's & Women's Cross Country
- Men's & Women's golf
- Men's and women's lacrosse
- Men's and women's soccer
- Softball
- Men's and women's swimming and diving
- Women's volleyball
- Wrestling (independent)

== See also ==
- Mercyhurst University
