= North East, Pennsylvania =

Borough in Pennsylvania, US

- Borough
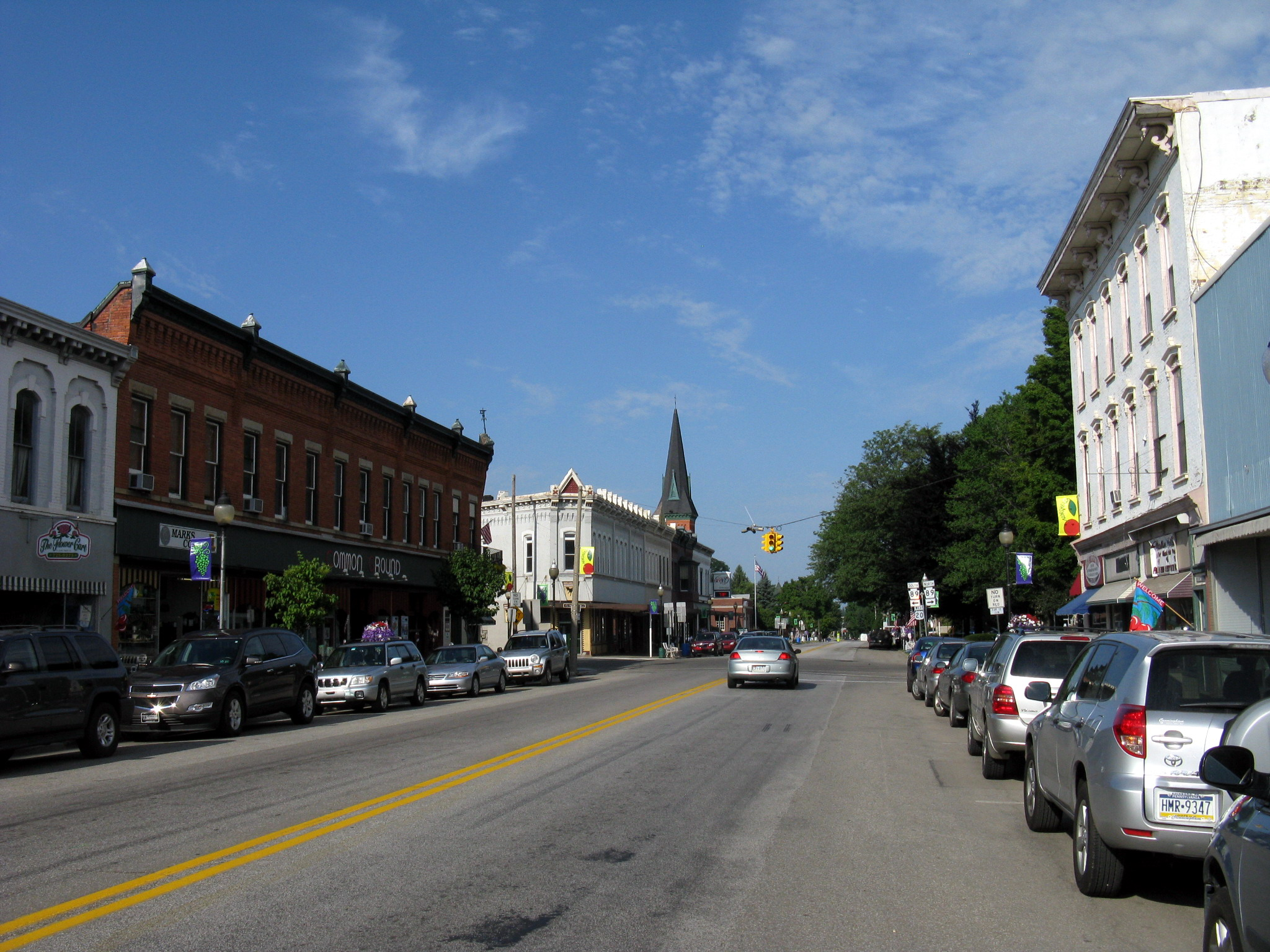
- Main Street, looking west toward Lake Street (Pennsylvania Route 89)
- Etymology: North East Township
- Location in Erie County and the U.S. state of Pennsylvania.
- Coordinates: 42°12′48″N 79°50′1″W
- Country: United States
- State: Pennsylvania
- County: Erie
- Settled: 1794
- Incorporated: February 27, 1834
- Founder: Joseph Shadduck

Government
  - Mayor: Bobbi Jo Morey (R)

Area
  - Total: 1.30 sq mi (3.37 km^{2})
  - Land: 1.30 sq mi (3.37 km^{2})
  - Water: 0 sq mi (0.00 km^{2})
- Elevation (Borough benchmark): 802 ft (244 m)
- Highest elevation (southeast corner of borough): 870 ft (270 m)
- Lowest elevation (unnamed tributary to Lake Erie): 740 ft (230 m)

Population (2020)
  - Total: 4,106
  - Density: 3,151.4/sq mi (1,216.77/km^{2})
- Time zone: UTC-4 (EST)
  - Summer (DST): UTC-5 (EDT)
- ZIP code: 16428
- Area code: 814
- FIPS code: 42-54952
- Website: northeastborough.com

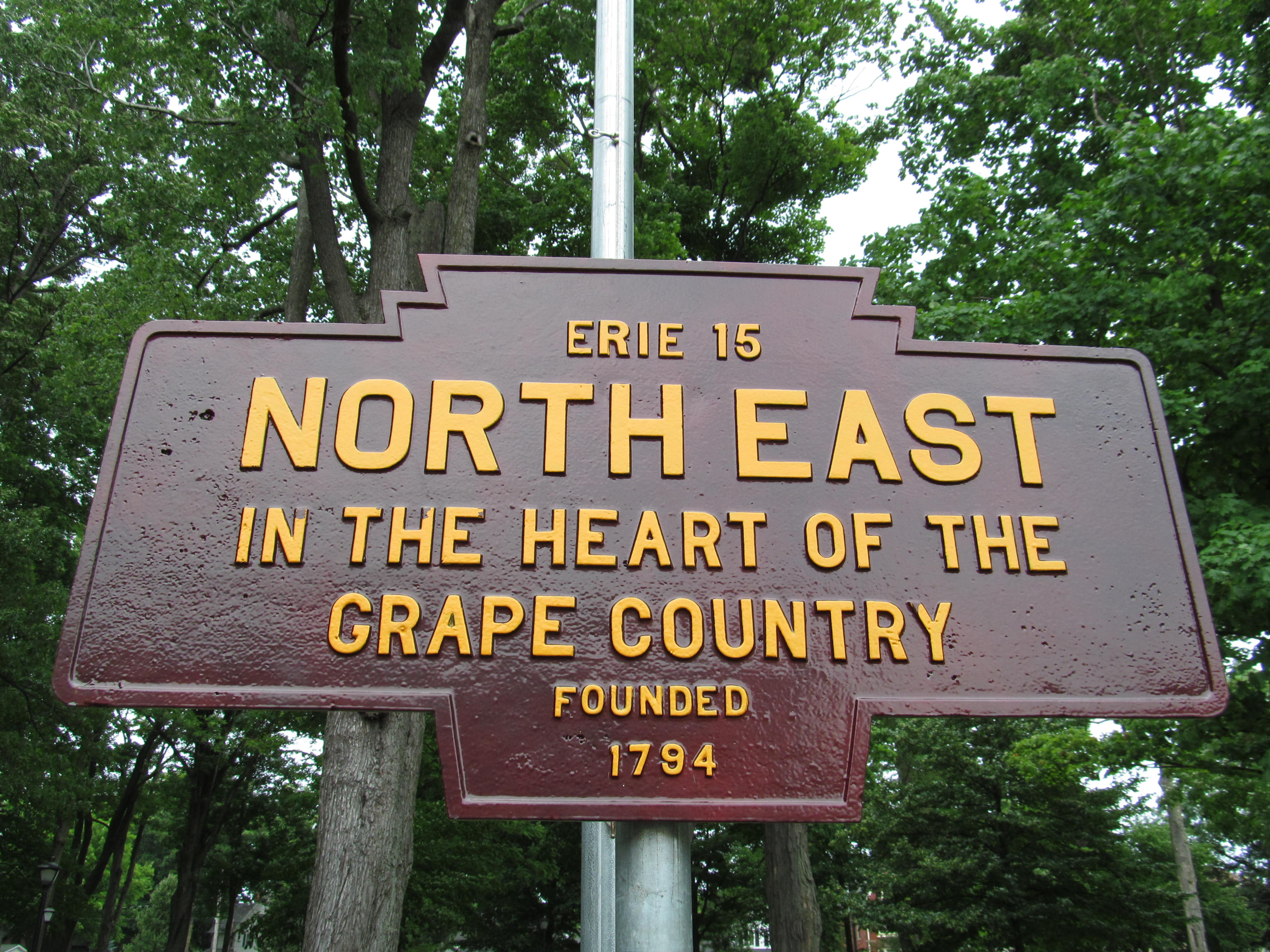
A Keystone Marker, with an atypical color scheme, in North East

North East is a borough surrounded by North East Township, Erie County, Pennsylvania, United States, 14 miles (23 km) northeast of Erie. Its name comes from its position near the northeastern corner of Erie County, despite being near the extreme northwestern corner of Pennsylvania. The population was 4,114 at the 2020 census, down from 4,294 in 2010. Fruit growing has long been a popular economic endeavor locally, especially for cherries and grapes. There is an annual cherry festival in the summer and the annual Wine Country Harvest Festival in autumn. It is part of the Erie Metropolitan Statistical Area. It is the northernmost borough in Pennsylvania.

== History ==
Before 1650, the area was settled by the Eriez, a relatively peaceful tribe; however, they were destroyed by the Seneca.

As part of the Erie Triangle, it was only in 1792 that the locale became part of Pennsylvania. However, North East did not receive its first settlers until 1794, still, several years before the county (Erie) and township (North East) were organized. Originally the North East Township was called "Lower Greenfield", being downstream from Greenfield Township. The first road was built in 1797 from present-day Freeport at the mouth of Sixteenmile Creek to present-day Colt Station, now in Greenfield Township. That road was extended in 1798 to where French Creek forks (present-day Wattsburg). In 1800 a road from the village of North East to Wattsburg was opened, it paralleled, but ran east of, the first one from Freeport.

This first recorded settler of the region was Joseph Shadduck from Brattleboro, Vermont in 1795. The land that the borough occupies was originally purchased from the state by a Mr. Brown, who sold it to a land speculator, a Mr. Gibson. William Dundas was the first to settle in the borough area, whose property was later sold in 1806 to Henry Burgett, who turned the dwelling into a tavern. This property, prior to the sale, is claimed to be the site of the first sacrament to the Lord's Supper in Erie County on Sunday the 27th of September 1801. A more "pretentious" tavern was built in 1808 by Lemuel Brown, located where the Haynes House is today.

Originally called Burgettstown, the name was changed in 1819 to Gibsonville until it was incorporated in 1834 as the borough of North East.

In 1798 the first school was formed.

Its first high school, Lake Shore Seminary, was established in 1870 as a collaborative effort of the Methodist and Presbyterian Churches. In 1884, a fire destroyed two-thirds of the town's business district.

In 1983, Short's Hotel was listed on the National Register of Historic Places. In 1990 the entire old central business district was added to the register.

== Government ==
The Borough of North East is incorporated as a borough under Pennsylvania law. The borough is governed by a mayor–council government. The government consists of a mayor, and a six-member borough council. They are elected to four-year terms, with the terms of the council designed to be overlapping. The borough council prepares legislation and conducts oversight. The council meets in North East Borough Hall. Bobbi Jo Morey is the mayor of the Borough of North East. As of September 2024, the North East Borough Council consists of:

- Amber Belson - President
- Ryan D. McGregor - Vice-president
- Bill Beardsley
- Todd Luke
- Heather Jones
- Nancy Anderson

North East is in Pennsylvania's 16th congressional district and is currently represented in Congress by Republican Mike Kelly, who was elected in 2010. Republican Dan Laughlin of the 49th District represents North East in the Pennsylvania State Senate and Republican Jake Banta of the 4th District represents North East in the Pennsylvania House of Representatives.

== Geography ==
North East is located in northeastern Erie County at 42°12′48″N 79°50′1″W (42.213385, -79.833711). It is surrounded by North East Township.

According to the United States Census Bureau, the borough has a total area of 1.3 square miles (3.4 km^{2}), all land.

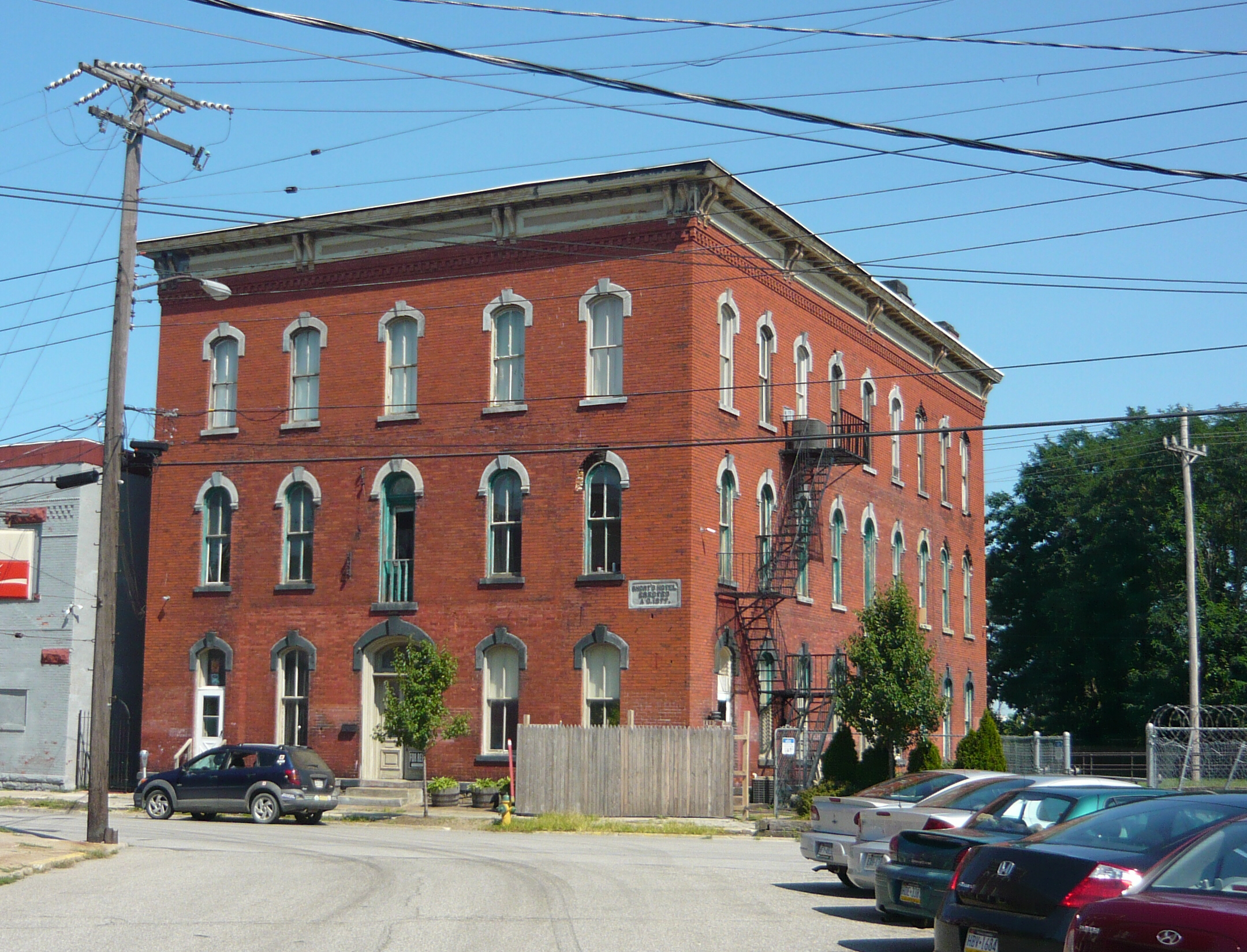
Short's Hotel (1899) National Register of Historic Places

== Demographics ==
Historical population
Census	Pop.	Note	%±
1850	387		—
1860	566		46.3%
1870	900		59.0%
1880	1,396		55.1%
1890	1,538		10.2%
1900	2,068		34.5%
1910	2,672		29.2%
1920	3,481		30.3%
1930	3,670		5.4%
1940	3,704		0.9%
1950	4,247		14.7%
1960	4,217		−0.7%
1970	3,846		−8.8%
1980	4,568		18.8%
1990	4,617		1.1%
2000	4,601		−0.3%
2010	4,294		−6.7%
2020	4,106		−4.4%
2021 (est.)	4,079	▼	−0.7%

=== 2020 census ===
As of the 2020 census, North East had a population of 4,106. The median age was 37.2 years. 24.6% of residents were under the age of 18 and 17.0% of residents were 65 years of age or older. For every 100 females there were 96.0 males, and for every 100 females age 18 and over there were 91.8 males age 18 and over.

100.0% of residents lived in urban areas, while 0.0% lived in rural areas.

There were 1,692 households in North East, of which 32.3% had children under the age of 18 living in them. Of all households, 41.1% were married-couple households, 19.2% were households with a male householder and no spouse or partner present, and 31.1% were households with a female householder and no spouse or partner present. About 31.0% of all households were made up of individuals and 13.4% had someone living alone who was 65 years of age or older.

There were 1,800 housing units, of which 6.0% were vacant. The homeowner vacancy rate was 1.8% and the rental vacancy rate was 3.6%.

Racial composition as of the 2020 census
Race	Number	Percent
White	3,738	91.0%
Black or African American	46	1.1%
American Indian and Alaska Native	2	0.0%
Asian	14	0.3%
Native Hawaiian and Other Pacific Islander	2	0.0%
Some other race	29	0.7%
Two or more races	275	6.7%
Hispanic or Latino (of any race)	109	2.7%

=== 2000 census ===
As of the census of 2000, there were 4,601 people, 1,730 households, and 1,162 families residing in the borough. The population density was 3,515.4 inhabitants per square mile (1,357.3/km^{2}). There were 1,795 housing units at an average density of 1,371.5 per square mile (529.5/km^{2}). The racial makeup of the borough was 97.65% White, 0.80% African American, 0.09% Native American, 0.09% Asian, 0.59% from other races, and 0.78% from two or more races. Hispanic or Latino of any race were 1.87% of the population.

There were 1,730 households, out of which 35.7% had children under the age of 18 living with them, 48.9% were married couples living together, 14.4% had a female householder with no husband present, and 32.8% were non-families. 29.3% of all households were made up of individuals, and 14.1% had someone living alone who was 65 years of age or older. The average household size was 2.53 and the average family size was 3.12.

In the borough, the population was spread out, with 27.5% under the age of 18, 11.2% from 18 to 24, 27.0% from 25 to 44, 20.3% from 45 to 64, and 13.9% who were 65 years of age or older. The median age was 34 years. For every 100 females, there were 94.5 males. For every 100 females age 18 and over, there were 87.9 males.

The median income for a household in the borough was $36,431, and the median income for a family was $43,250. Males had a median income of $33,939 versus $21,921 for females. The per capita income for the borough was $16,132. About 10.0% of families and 13.6% of the population were below the poverty line, including 18.3% of those under age 18 and 11.9% of those age 65 or over.

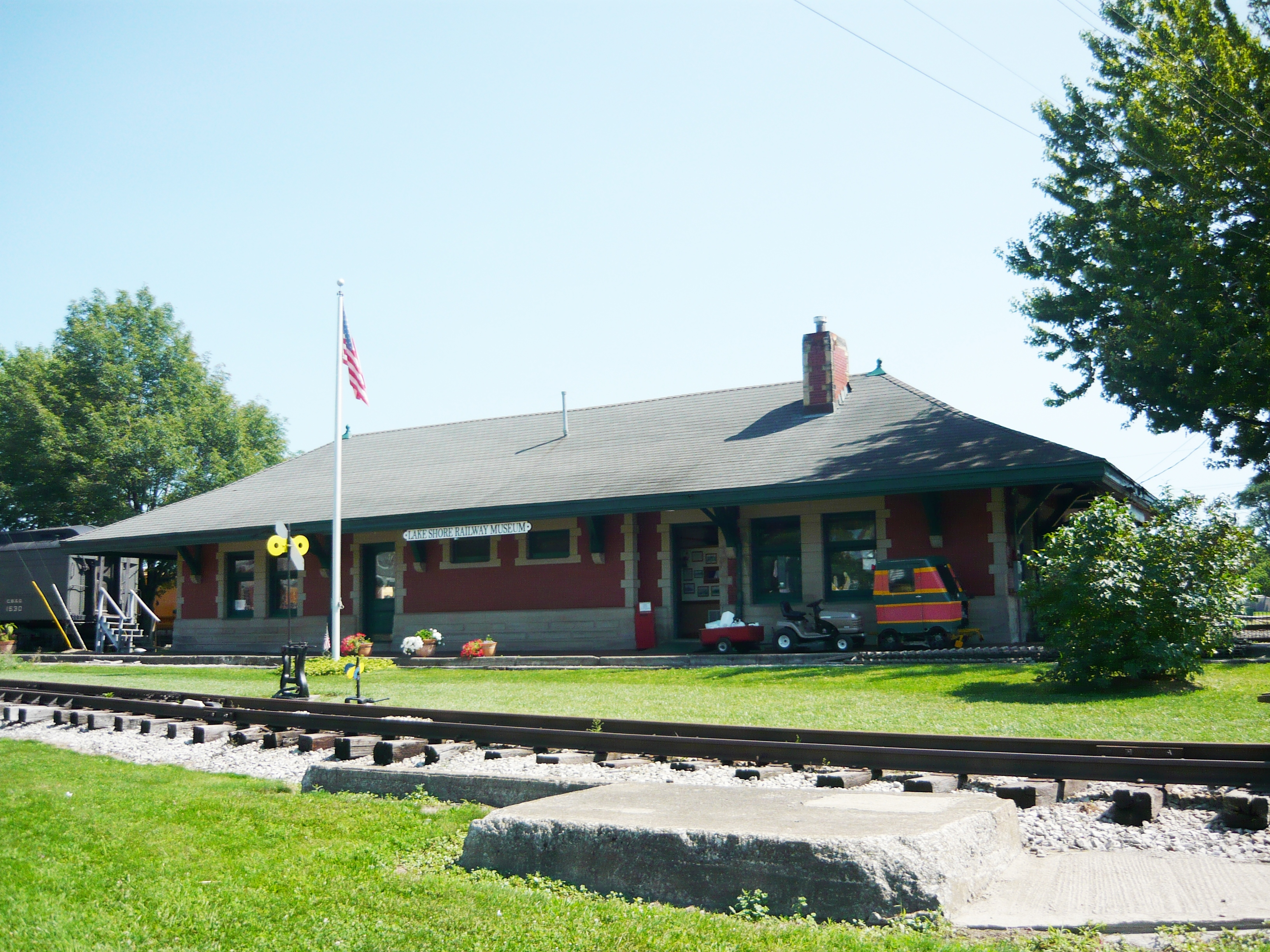
Lake Shore Railway Museum (1899)

== Culture ==
North East has the Lake Shore Railway Museum, housed in its former railroad station.

== Schools ==
The North East School District includes Earle C. Davis Primary School, Intermediate Elementary School, North East Middle School, and North East High School.

From 1991 to 2021, Mercyhurst North East operated in North East as a branch of Mercyhurst University.

== Notable people ==
- Cooper Boone, country music artist
- Samuel Myron Brainerd, United States House of Representatives
- Julius C. Burrows, U.S. Representative and a U.S. Senator from the state of Michigan
- Frank Hamilton Cushing, anthropologist and ethnologist
- Winifred Davidson, writer of children's short stories and poetry
- Charles Fehrenbach, Redemptorist priest, author, translator, and host of a local religious radio program in the Philadelphia area
- Laura de Force Gordon, lawyer, newspaper publisher, and a prominent suffragette
- Frank A. Gough, orthodontist
- Jesse More Greenman, botanist
- Ish Kabibble, comedian and cornet player
- Clement O. Miniger, industrialist and philanthropist
- Richard Lowell Nygaard, Senior United States circuit judge of the United States Court of Appeals for the Third Circuit
- Tom Scrimenti, Pennsylvania House of Representatives
- Halli Reid, first woman to swim across Lake Erie
