= Directly affiliated local union =

Type of US labor union

A directly affiliated local union (DALU) or federal labor union is a US labor union that belongs to the American Federation of Labor and Congress of Industrial Organizations (AFL–CIO) but is not a national union and is not entitled to the same rights and privileges within the Federation as national affiliates.

Legally, the AFL–CIO is the parent union of each DALU, and is responsible for filing financial disclosure forms with federal and state authorities and providing bargaining support. The AFL–CIO also takes fiduciary responsibility for the local.

Most DALUs have fewer than 1000 members and represent workers in only one workplace.

DALU status is usually indicated by the sign on a union office or the title of a webpage, e.g., 'DALU Local 2002, AFL–CIO.' The origin of the numbering system is obscure; that one DALU is called 'Local 2002' does not indicate the existence of 2001 other DALUs, either currently or historically.

As of March 3, 2006, there were only six DALUs remaining in the AFL–CIO.

== History and Structure ==
Article XV of the AFL–CIO constitution authorizes the federation to issue charters to 'directly affiliated local unions,' although many trade departments of the AFL–CIO do not.

The AFL constitution permitted the formation of DALUs, or federal unions. But DALUs remained few in number until the early 1930s when the Congress of Industrial Organizations (CIO) challenged the AFL's craft unionism policies. Although the AFL officially rejected industrial unionism, it could not argue with the success CIO unions were having. Rather than admit failure, however, in 1933 the AFL proposed to use DALUs to organize workers on an industrial basis.

The AFL did not promise to allow DALUs to maintain a separate identity indefinitely. In fact, the AFL dissolved hundreds of federal unions in late 1934 and early 1935 and assigned the members to various other unions.

Although the AFL (which later merged with CIO to become the AFL–CIO) continued to charter DALUs, it did so infrequently and in extremely small numbers. Beginning in the early 1970s, the AFL–CIO adopted an official policy encouraging DALUs to merge with national affiliates. After the election of John Sweeney as president of the AFL–CIO in 1995, the AFL–CIO executive council adopted a policy preventing the charter of new DALUs.

== DALUs and solidarity charters ==
The disaffiliation of several major unions in 2005 led the AFL–CIO to reconsider the use of DALUs. Many of the disaffiliated unions provided the majority of members, staff and funds to AFL-CIO state federations and central labor councils. The loss of these resources would not only have effectively dismantled the AFL–CIO presence in these areas but eviscerated the labor movement as well.

A number of AFL–CIO trade departments—in particular the Building and Construction Trades and the Metal Trades—would also have been strongly and negatively affected. These trade departments had established highly complex recognition, hiring hall and jurisdictional agreements in their respective industries. The defection of even one large union from the AFL–CIO could unravel these agreements.

In August 2005, the AFL–CIO executive council approved the creation of 'solidarity charters.' The charters would be offered to locals of the Change to Win Federation (CTW). Final agreement between CTW and the AFL–CIO on a funding mechanism occurred on October 17, 2005.

Sweeney directly equated solidarity charters to DALUs.

CTW locals with solidarity charters have full voting rights in the AFL–CIO bodies with which they chose to affiliate, and CTW members and officers may run for and hold office in these bodies. A per capita 'solidarity fee' is paid by the CTW local into the AFL–CIO's Solidarity Fund to defray the administrative costs of maintaining the state and local bodies as well as support their programs. Receipt of a solidarity charter also requires the CTW local to agree not to raid an existing AFL–CIO affiliate or interfere in an AFL–CIO organizing campaign.

More than 1,600 CTW locals subsequently received solidarity charters.

On February 27, 2006, the AFL–CIO and the National Education Association (NEA) agreed to permit NEA local unions to join AFL–CIO state and local bodies as a 'directly affiliated NEA local' (DANL). The agreement expressly notes that DANLs have the same rights and obligations as any DALU. This include representation and voting, and coverage under the 'no-raid' provisions of Articles XX and XXI of the AFL–CIO constitution.

In December 2005, the Metal Trades Department amended its constitution and bylaws to permit CTW unions to receive solidarity charters as well. The Building and Construction Trades Department (BCTD) followed suit in March 2006. Other AFL–CIO trade departments were expected to do so as well. A number of CTW international unions subsequently received solidarity charters from the Metal Trades and BCTD.

== DLAs ==
On March 1, 2006, the AFL–CIO executive council adopted a program, known as the Unity Partnership, to allow independent unions that do not qualify for a national charter to directly affiliate as a 'direct local affiliate' (DLA) similar to a DALU.

In May 2001, the 100,000 members of the United American Nurses (UAN)—the labor arm of the American Nurses Association—sought affiliation with the AFL–CIO. The 200,000-member California School Employees Association (CSEA), an independent union of paraprofessional school workers, also sought to join the AFL–CIO. Both unions were barely large enough to be self-sufficient in terms of resources, bargaining support and other core union activities, however.

Faced with declining AFL–CIO membership and criticism of his tenure as president, John Sweeney strong-armed the AFL–CIO executive council into voting to approve both affiliations. Sweeney also won approval to seat both union presidents on the AFL–CIO executive council. This angered some larger unions—many of whom had only one seat on the council but who were 10 times larger. Still other unions argued that UAN and CSEA should have entered the AFL–CIO through affiliation with an existing union rather than as independent organizations.

To address these criticisms, the AFL–CIO executive council adopted new criteria to be used in considering the granting of charters to independent organizations. The new rules set size, income and other criteria, and encouraged unions seeking affiliation to seek mergers with like-minded AFL–CIO unions rather than a direct charter.

But with the loss of several million members due to the disaffiliation of the CTW unions, the AFL–CIO sought to change the 2001 affiliation criteria.

Under the new Unity Partnership arrangement, the AFL–CIO will not be the parent of the DLA. DLAs will be covered by the federation's no-raid protections, will be able to participate in AFL–CIO state and local labor bodies, and will be entitled to the same benefits and services that national unions receive from the federation.

DLAs, however, will have to pay a per capita tax to the AFL–CIO, and the AFL–CIO will then distribute this money to the appropriate state, area and local central labor bodies. Unity Partnership dues are slightly higher than the combined national, state, area and local dues fully affiliated AFL–CIO unions pay, on average.

When a union applies for DLA status, the AFL–CIO will clear the petition with existing affiliated unions with employees in the same jurisdiction(s) to see if there are any objections. If there are none, DLA status will be granted for up to three years, after which time the certificate may be made permanent, expire or be extended.

As of April 3, 2006, the 11,000-member Minnesota Association of Professional Employees (MAPE) was seeking DLA status.
