= Erie–Meadville combined statistical area =

Erie–Meadville, PA Combined Statistical Area Combined Statistical Area
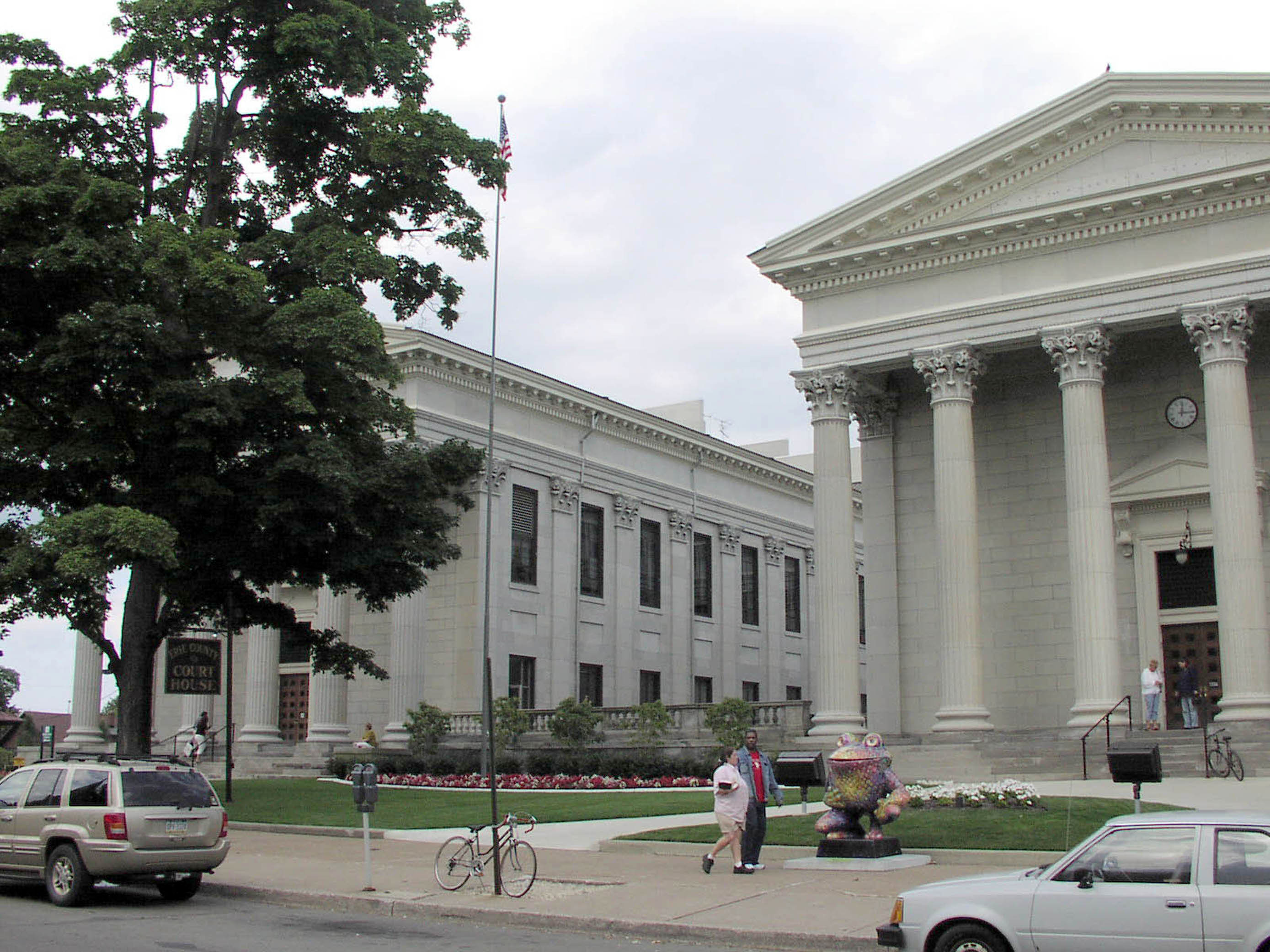
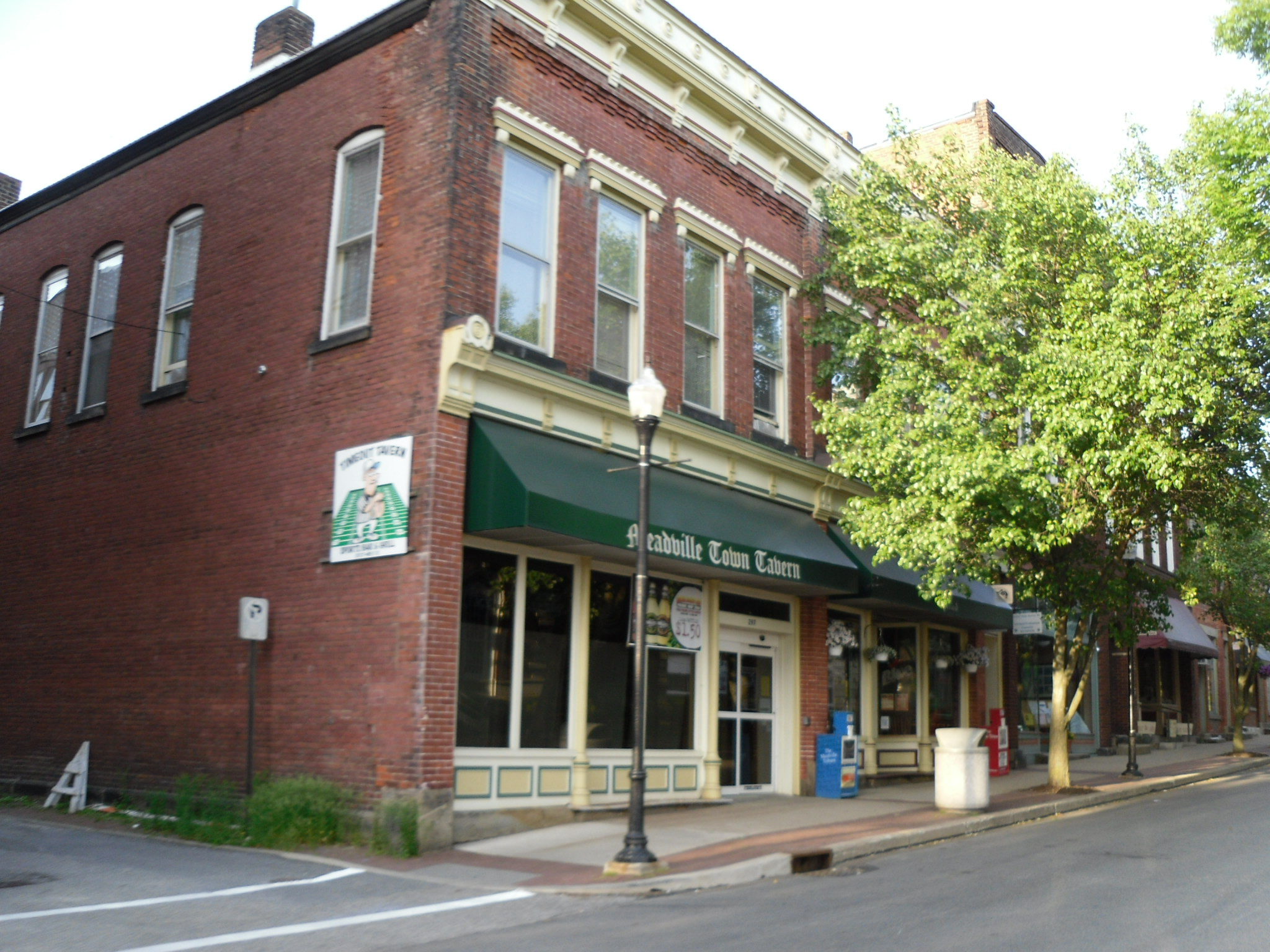
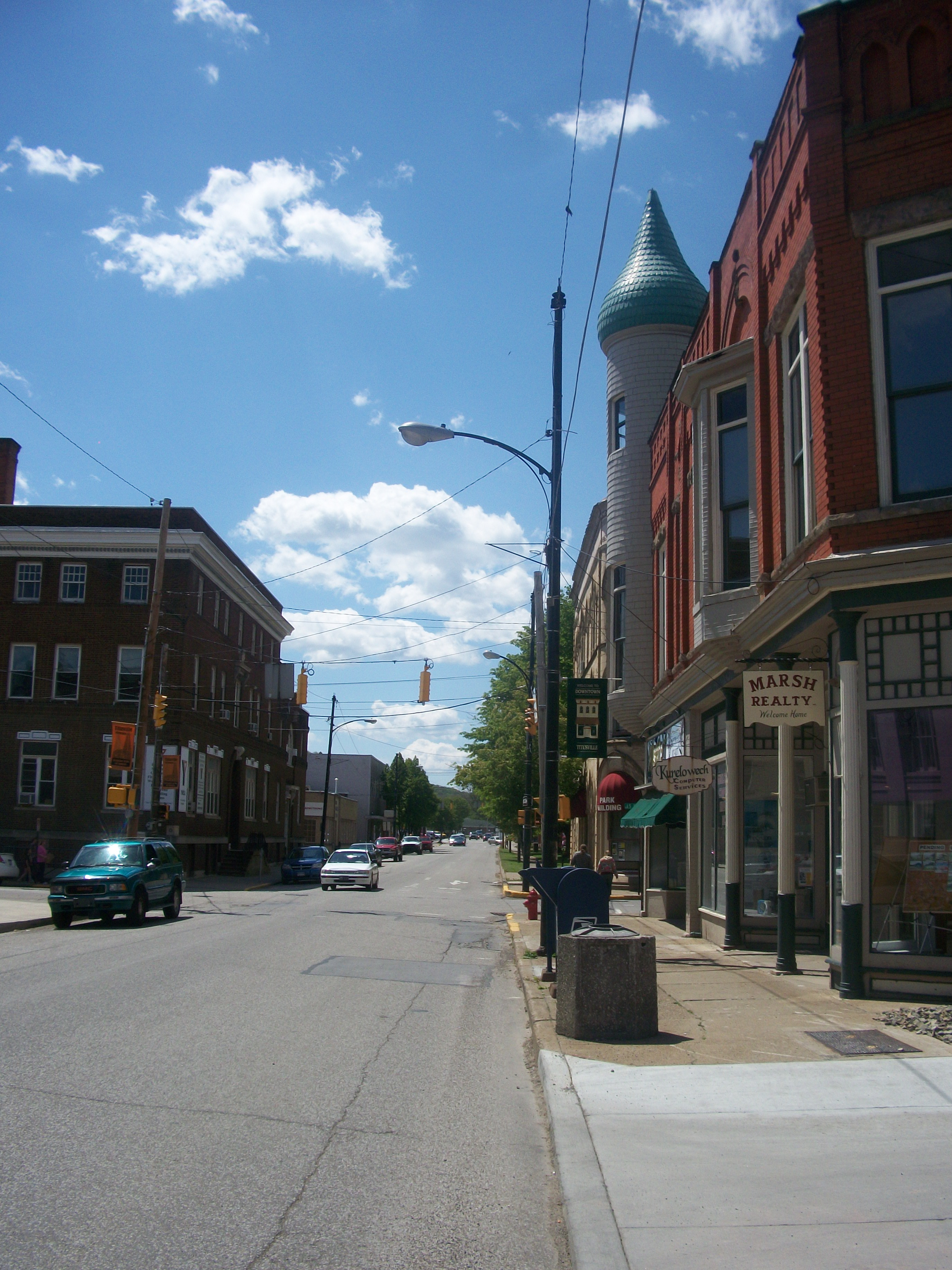
- Clockwise from top left: Erie, Meadville, and Titusville
Interactive Map of Erie–Meadville
Combined Statistical Area
City of Erie
Erie, PA MSA
Meadville, PA µSA
- Country: United States
- Commonwealth: Pennsylvania
- Largest city: Erie
- Other cities: List: In Region: Meadville

Area
  - Total: 799 sq mi (2,070 km^{2})

Population (2010)
  - Total: 369,331
  - Estimate (2025): 347,642

GDP
  - Total: $13.171 billion (2022)
- Time zone: UTC-5 (ET)
  - Summer (DST): UTC-4 (EDT)

The Erie–Meadville, PA Combined Statistical Area (CSA) is made up of two counties in northwestern Pennsylvania. The United States Office of Management and Budget has recognized the Erie and Meadville areas along with the counties of Erie and Crawford to make a Combined Statistical Area, located in northwestern Pennsylvania.

As of the 2025 United States census estimates the combined statistical area had a population total of 347,642, making it the seventh-largest in Pennsylvania and 110th-largest in the nation.

== Erie, PA Metropolitan Statistical Area ==
- Erie County – population 265,832

=== Cities and boroughs ===
- Corry
- Edinboro
- Erie
- Girard
- Lake City
- Lawrence Park
- McKean
- North East
- Northwest Harborcreek
- Union City
- Wesleyville

== Meadville, PA Micropolitan Statistical Area ==
- Crawford County – population 88,765

=== Cities/major boroughs ===
- Meadville
- Titusville

== See also ==
- List of Metropolitan Statistical Areas
- List of Combined Statistical Areas
