= Pennsylvania House of Representatives, District 2 =

American legislative district

Pennsylvania's 2nd State House of Representatives district
Representative
| Robert E. Merski; D–Erie |
- Population (2022): 65,669

The 2nd Pennsylvania House of Representatives District is represented by Democratic Representative Robert E. Merski.

== District profile ==
The 2nd Pennsylvania House of Representatives District is located in Erie County and includes the following areas:

- Erie
  - Ward 05
- Greene Township
- Harborcreek Township
- Summit Township
- Wesleyville

== Representatives ==
| Representative | Party | Years | District home | Notes |
Before 1969, seats were apportioned by county.
| Robert Bellomini | Democrat | 1969–1978 | Erie | Moved from the 1st Erie County district. Resigned on June 13. |
| Italo Cappabianca | Democrat | 1979–2001 | Erie | Died in office on May 28. |
| Gayle Wright | Democrat | 2001–2002 | Erie | Elected in a special election on August 14. Defeated in primary. |
| Florindo Fabrizio | Democrat | 2003–2018 | Erie | Did not seek re-election in 2018. Died in office on July 24. |
| Robert E. Merski | Democrat | 2019–present | Erie | Incumbent |

== Recent election results ==
PA House election, 2024: Pennsylvania House, District 2
| Party | Candidate | Votes | % |
|---|---|---|---|
| Democratic | Robert Merski (incumbent) | 19,430 | 62.91 |
| Republican | Matt Strupczewski | 11,456 | 37.09 |
| Total votes | | 30,886 | 100.00 |
| Democratic hold | | | |

PA House election, 2022: Pennsylvania House, District 2
| Party | Candidate | Votes | % |
|---|---|---|---|
| Democratic | Robert Merski (incumbent) | 16,242 | 64.17 |
| Republican | Michael Pace | 9,068 | 35.83 |
| Total votes | | 25,310 | 100.00 |
| Democratic hold | | | |

PA House election, 2020: Pennsylvania House, District 2
| Party | Candidate | Votes | % |
|---|---|---|---|
| Democratic | Robert Merski (incumbent) | Unopposed | |
| Total votes | | 22,342 | 100.00 |
| Democratic hold | | | |

PA House election, 2018: Pennsylvania House, District 2
| Party | Candidate | Votes | % |
|---|---|---|---|
| Democratic | Robert Merski | 13,736 | 64.90 |
| Republican | Timothy Kuzma | 7,429 | 35.10 |
| Total votes | | 21,165 | 100.00 |
| Democratic hold | | | |

PA House election, 2016: Pennsylvania House, District 2
| Party | Candidate | Votes | % |
|---|---|---|---|
| Democratic | Florindo Fabrizio (incumbent) | 16,051 | 63.76 |
| Republican | Patrick Fuller | 9,124 | 36.24 |
| Total votes | | 25,175 | 100.00 |
| Democratic hold | | | |

PA House election, 2014: Pennsylvania House, District 2
| Party | Candidate | Votes | % |
|---|---|---|---|
| Democratic | Florindo Fabrizio (incumbent) | Unopposed | |
| Total votes | | 11,214 | 100.00 |
| Democratic hold | | | |

PA House election, 2012: Pennsylvania House, District 2
| Party | Candidate | Votes | % |
|---|---|---|---|
| Democratic | Florindo Fabrizio (incumbent) | Unopposed | |
| Total votes | | 19,860 | 100.00 |
| Democratic hold | | | |

PA House election, 2010: Pennsylvania House, District 2
| Party | Candidate | Votes | % |
|---|---|---|---|
| Democratic | Florindo Fabrizio (incumbent) | Unopposed | |
| Total votes | | 13,617 | 100.00 |
| Democratic hold | | | |
