= Iroquois School District =

School district in Pennsylvania

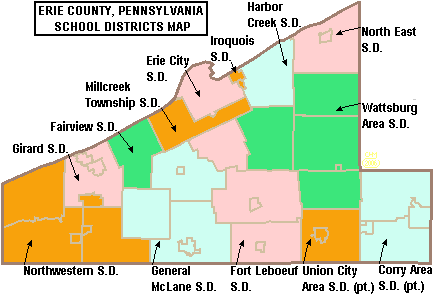

Iroquois School District is a school district that has provided education to the children of Wesleyville borough and the township of Lawrence Park since 1966, when separate school districts were merged. The district is located just east of the city of Erie in Erie County, Pennsylvania. At 2.3 square miles (6.0 km^{2}), the district is the second smallest in the commonwealth.

== Facilities ==
The Lawrence Park Elementary School building was constructed in 1925 as its township high school. Lawrence Park High School served the community until the school districts merged, at which point it became an elementary school. The building, which was renovated in 1979, consisted of 13 classrooms, a library, gymnasium, stage, computer lab, and large group instruction room. It taught the district's 4th to 6th grade students from 1985 to 2007. The building, once located at 4231 Morse Street, was razed in 2007 to make room for a new elementary school on the same property.

The Wesleyville Elementary School building was its township's only school, serving grades K-12 until the merger of school districts, at which point it became an elementary school. The school taught the district's kindergarten to 3rd grade students from 1985 to 2007. The building, which is located at 2138 Willow Street, had twenty classrooms with 380 students. The building was scheduled to be sold.

Iroquois Elementary School, which serves students grades K-6, was built on the site of the former Lawrence Park Elementary School. The new elementary school opened its doors for the 2007-2008 school year. The Iroquois School District offices, which were previously situated in the Lawrence Park Elementary School, were relocated in the new elementary school as of August 2007.

Iroquois Junior-Senior High School serves students grades 7-12. The school mascot is the Iroquois Brave. The High School is home to the Iroquois Marching Braves, a large marching band which competes in the Lakeshore Marching Band Association's (LMBA) Class A Division.
