= Northwest Harborcreek, Pennsylvania =

Unincorporated community in Pennsylvania, US

- Census-designated place
- Location in Erie County and the U.S. state of Pennsylvania.
- Coordinates: 42°8′53″N 79°59′44″W
- Country: United States
- State: Pennsylvania
- County: Erie
- Township: Harborcreek

Area
  - Total: 5.00 sq mi (12.96 km^{2})
  - Land: 5.00 sq mi (12.96 km^{2})
  - Water: 0 sq mi (0.00 km^{2})
- Elevation: 726 ft (221 m)

Population (2020)
  - Total: 8,772
  - Density: 1,753.4/sq mi (676.98/km^{2})
- Time zone: UTC-4 (EST)
  - Summer (DST): UTC-5 (EDT)
- Area code: 814
- FIPS code: 42-55572

Northwest Harborcreek is a census-designated place (CDP) in Erie County, Pennsylvania, United States. The population was 8,949 at the 2010 census. It includes the unincorporated communities of Fairfield and Brookside and is part of the Erie Metropolitan Statistical Area.

== Geography ==
Northwest Harborcreek occupies the northwestern part of Harborcreek Township in northeastern Erie County. It is located at 42°8′53″N 79°59′44″W (42.148144, -79.995597) and is bordered to the west by Lawrence Park Township, the borough of Wesleyville, and the city of Erie. The northern edge of the CDP is the shore of Lake Erie.

Pennsylvania Route 5 (East Lake Road) runs through the northern (Fairfield) part of the CDP, leading southwest 5 miles (8 km) to downtown Erie and northeast 14 miles (23 km) to the New York state line. U.S. Route 20 (Buffalo Road) runs through the center of the CDP, leading southwest through Wesleyville 4 miles (6 km) into Erie and northeast 10 miles (16 km) to the borough of North East. Pennsylvania Route 430 passes through the southwestern (Brookside) part of the CDP, leading northwest into Wesleyville and southeast 2 miles (3 km) to Interstate 90 at Exit 32.

According to the United States Census Bureau, the CDP has a total area of 5.0 square miles (13.0 km^{2}), all land.

== Demographics ==
Historical population
Census	Pop.	Note	%±
2020	8,772		—
U.S. Decennial Census

As of the census of 2000, there were 8,658 people, 3,165 households, and 2,335 families residing in the community. The population density was 1,722.3 inhabitants per square mile (665.0/km^{2}). There were 3,294 housing units at an average density of 655.3 per square mile (253.0/km^{2}). The racial makeup of the community was 97.41% White, 1.39% African American, 0.09% Native American, 0.59% Asian, 0.12% from other races, and 0.40% from two or more races. Hispanic or Latino of any race were 0.44% of the population.

There were 3,165 households, out of which 31.0% had children under the age of 18 living with them, 62.9% were married couples living together, 7.9% had a female householder with no husband present, and 26.2% were non-families. 22.6% of all households were made up of individuals, and 12.0% had someone living alone who was 65 years of age or older. The average household size was 2.60 and the average family size was 3.05.

The population was spread out, with 23.3% under the age of 18, 7.9% from 18 to 24, 24.9% from 25 to 44, 25.4% from 45 to 64, and 18.5% who were 65 years of age or older. The median age was 42 years. For every 100 females, there were 95.7 males. For every 100 females age 18 and over, there were 91.1 males.

The median income for a household in the community was $48,620, and the median income for a family was $55,774. Males had a median income of $41,250 versus $27,295 for females. The per capita income for the community was $21,135. About 2.7% of families and 5.4% of the population were below the poverty line, including 5.5% of those under age 18 and 7.3% of those age 65 or over.
