= Paul Weitz =

Paul Weitz may refer to:

- Paul J. Weitz (1932–2017), American astronaut
- Paul Weitz (filmmaker) (born 1965), American filmmaker
