= Fairview High School (Pennsylvania) =

Location
- 7460 McCray Road; Fairview, (Erie County), Pennsylvania 16415; United States
- Coordinates: 42°01′17″N 80°14′46″W

Information
- Type: Public high school
- Established: 1973; 53 years ago
- School district: Fairview School District
- Principal: Luke Beall
- Staff: 85
- Teaching staff: 39.95 (FTE)
- Grades: 9-12
- Enrollment: 604 (2023–2024)
- Student to teacher ratio: 15.12
- Hours in school day: 7 hours
- Colors: Black and Red
- Athletics conference: PIAA
- Mascot: Tiger
- Team name: The Fairview Tigers
- Accreditation: Middle States Association of Colleges and Schools, Blue Ribbon 2014
- Yearbook: Challenge
- Website: www.fairviewschools.org/o/fhs

Fairview High School is a public high school located in Fairview Township, Pennsylvania, and it is part of the Fairview School District. The school serves as the only high school in Fairview Township, and has a yearly enrollment of approximately 550-600 students. The school's mascot is the tiger and their colors are red and black.

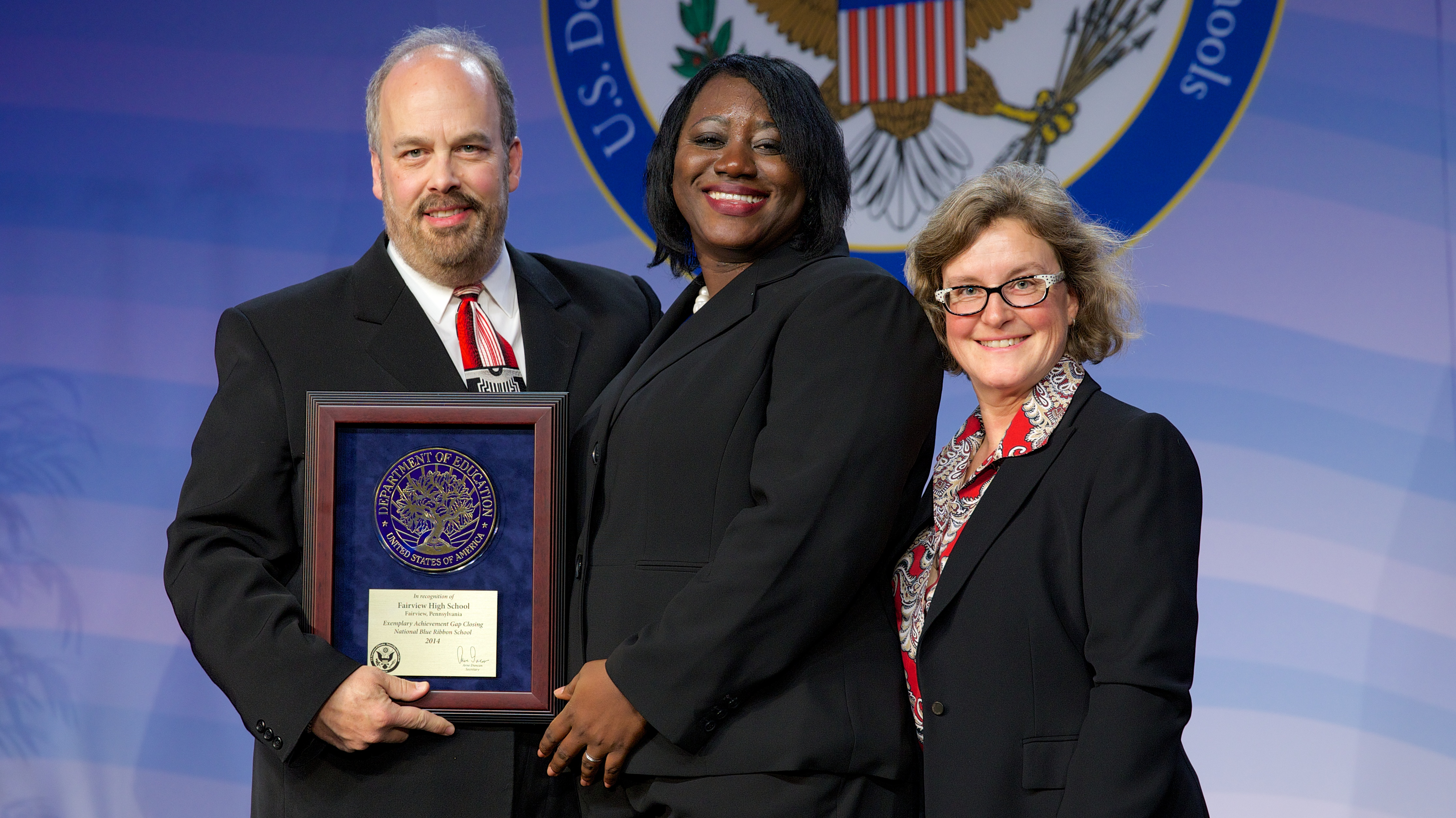
2014 National Blue Ribbon Schools Winner

== Academics ==
	Fairview (Verbal)	National (Verbal)	Fairview (Math)	National (Math)
Class of 2007	516	502	529	515
Class of 2008	520	502	538	515
Class of 2009	512	501	548	515
Class of 2010	506	501	518	516
Class of 2011	517	497	539	514

== Athletics ==
Fairview sports teams compete in PIAA District 10. Boys' Sports

- Baseball
- Basketball
- Cheerleading
- Cross Country
- Football
- Golf
- Lacrosse
- Soccer
- Swimming and Diving
- Tennis
- Track and Field

Girls' Sports

- Basketball
- Cheerleading
- Cross Country
- Golf
- Lacrosse
- Soccer
- Softball
- Swimming and Diving
- Tennis
- Track and Field
- Volleyball
- Water Polo

== Notable alumni ==
- Steve Potter (1976), former professional football linebacker and special teamer
- Ted Decker (1981), CEO of Home Depot
- Blake Roman, actor
- Katie Scott (2024), soccer player for the Penn State Nittany Lions, represents United States internationally
- Walker Scobell (anticipated graduation - 2027), actor
