= Main Library =

Main Library may refer to the following libraries:

- Main Library (Columbus, Ohio)
- Main Library (Erie, Pennsylvania)
- Main Library (San Francisco)
- Main Library (University of Illinois at Urbana–Champaign)
