= Robert Bellomini =

American politician (1925–1989)

Robert E. Bellomini

Member of the Pennsylvania House of Representatives from the 2nd district
- In office January 7, 1969 – June 13, 1978
- Preceded by: District Created
- Succeeded by: Italo Cappabianca

Member of the Pennsylvania House of Representatives from the Erie County district
- In office January 5, 1965 – November 30, 1968

Personal details
- Born: June 1, 1925 Erie, Pennsylvania
- Died: October 20, 1989 (aged 64) Erie, Pennsylvania
- Party: Democratic

Robert E. Bellomini (June 1, 1925 – October 20, 1989) is a former Democratic member of the Pennsylvania House of Representatives.
