= Penn State Erie (Behrend), Pennsylvania =

Unincorporated community in Pennsylvania, US

- Census-designated place
- Location in Erie County and the state of Pennsylvania
- Coordinates: 42°07′06″N 79°58′54″W
- Country: United States
- State: Pennsylvania
- County: Erie
- Township: Harborcreek

Area
  - Total: 0.78 sq mi (2.03 km^{2})
  - Land: 0.78 sq mi (2.03 km^{2})
  - Water: 0 sq mi (0.00 km^{2})
- Elevation: 1,070 ft (330 m)

Population (2020)
  - Total: 1,486
  - Density: 1,899.1/sq mi (733.25/km^{2})
- Time zone: UTC-5 (Eastern (EST))
  - Summer (DST): UTC-4 (EDT)
- ZIP code: 16510
- Area code: 814
- FIPS code: 42-59212
- GNIS feature ID: 2633746

Penn State Erie (Behrend) is a census-designated place located in Harborcreek Township, Erie County in the U.S. state of Pennsylvania. It is located around the campus of Penn State Erie and near the city of Erie. As of the 2010 census the population was 1,629.

== Demographics ==
As of the 2020 census, there were 1,486 people and 14 housing units. The median age was 19.6 years old. 100% of the residents were in college. The racial demographics of the CDP were 80.6% White, 12.7% African American, 0.4% Asian, 0.8% of people from some other race, and 5.3% from two or more races. Hispanic and/or Latino Americans made up 6% of the population.

The ancestry of the population was 13.3% German, 10.6% Italian, 7.4% Irish, 5.4% Polish, 5.2% Sub-sarahan African, 3.4% Swedish, and 2.1% English. 12.6% of the population spoke a language other than English at home, including Asian and Pacific Islander languages at 6.4%, Other Indo-European languages at 3.0%, and other languages at 2.6%. 9.1% of the population was not born in the United States.

Historical population
Census	Pop.	Note	%±
2020	1,486		—
U.S. Decennial Census
