= Erie Public Library =

Erie Public Library may refer to:

- Buffalo & Erie County Public Library, in New York
- Libraries of the Erie County library system, in Erie, Pennsylvania
- Main Library (Erie, Pennsylvania), in Erie, Pennsylvania
