= Harbor Creek School District =

School district in Pennsylvania

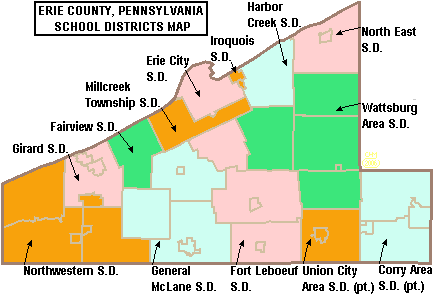

Location
- Erie, Pennsylvania Harborcreek Township United States

District information
- Type: Public
- Motto: "Educational Excellence = Student Success"
- Established: 1900
- Superintendent: Dr. Buckley Cook

Other information
- Website: www.hcsd.iu5.org

The Harbor Creek School District is the public kindergarten-through-12th grade education system for Harborcreek, Pennsylvania. The school district is one of 501 school districts in the Commonwealth of Pennsylvania. By state law, the district has nine school board members in addition to its central administration. The district is composed of one high school, one junior high school and three elementary schools with approximately 2,000 students district wide.

== Administration ==
=== Board of education ===
School board members serve a term of four years. Elections are those positions are held in odd numbered years with the primary election in May and the general election in November. Elections for officers (president and vice president) are held annually, at the board's reorganization meeting, typically on the first Monday in December. The treasurer is elected by board members at the board meeting in July. The board members for 2026 are as follows, with office held:

- David Vrenna, President
- Dr. Amy Parente, Vice-president
- Dr. Thomas Fortin, Treasurer
- Terri Brink
- Ryan Cowser
- Alyson Eaglen
- David Eaglen
- Keith Farrell
- Ed Mattson

=== Central administration ===
- Dr. Buckley Cook, Superintendent
- Karl Dolak, Chief Financial Officer
- Drew Mortensen, Curriculum Director
- Abby Cox, Athletic Director

=== Building administrators ===
- Taylor Hilinski, principal, Harbor Creek Senior High School
- Andrew Krahe, principal, Harbor Creek Junior High School
- Donna Rose, principal, Clark Elementary School
- Dr. Tyler Cook, principal, Klein Elementary School
- Jesse Williams, principal, Rolling Ridge Elementary School

== Central Campus ==
The Central Campus of the Harbor Creek School District is located at the intersection of U.S. Route 20 (Buffalo Road) and PA Route 531 (Depot Road). It contains the following facilities:

- Central Administration Office
- Senior High School
- Junior High School
- Paul J. Weitz Stadium (Football, Soccer, Track & Field)
- Paul M. Foust Field (Baseball)
- Softball Field
- Tennis Courts
- Transportation/Bussing Facilities
- Junior High Gymnasium (Volleyball, Basketball, Wrestling)
- Natatorium (Swimming & Diving)

The three elementary schools as well as the former Central High School are located on property in other areas of Harborcreek Township

== Harbor Creek Senior High School ==
The high school serves grades 9 through 12. It is located at the intersection of U.S. Route 20 (Buffalo Road) and PA Route 531 (Depot Road).

=== Athletics ===
The Harbor Creek Huskies are a member of PIAA District 10. The teams participate in either the 2A, 3A, or 4A classifications. The school district currently sponsors 13 varsity level sports:

(Classifications for the 2026/27 and 2027/28 school years)

==== Fall sports ====
- Cross Country (Boys and Girls) (2A)
- Football (Boys) (4A)
- Golf (Boys and Girls) (3A)
- Soccer (Boys and Girls) (3A)
- Volleyball (Girls) (4A)

==== Winter sports ====
- Basketball (Boys and Girls) (4A)
- Competitive Spirit (Girls) (2A)
- Swimming and Diving (Boys and Girls) (2A)
- Wrestling (Boys) (3A)

==== Spring sports ====
- Baseball (Boys) (4A)
- Softball (Girls) (4A)
- Tennis (Boys) (2A)
- Track and Field (Boys and Girls) (3A)

=== PIAA State Champions ===
==== Wrestling ====
- Rich Passerotti, 185 lbs., Class AAA, 1978
- Jeff Catrabone, 145 lbs., Class AAA, 1992
- Jeff Catrabone, 152 lbs., Class AAA, 1993

==== Boys Swimming and Diving ====
- 200 yd. Freestyle Relay Team (1:29.11), Class AA, 1999 - Lee Hall, Mark Ostrzeniec, Rick Podbielski, Chad Weaver

==== Softball ====
- Class AA, 2006
- Class 3A, 2024

==== Boys Track and Field ====
- Steve Moorhead, Mile Run (4:26.1), Class A, 1958
- Rich Arpin, Mile Run (4:21.6), Class B, 1968
- Rich Arpin, 880 yd. Dash (1:57.6), Class B, 1968
- Brian Sontag, Discus (163–4), Class AAA, 1990
- Chris Carpin, Pole Vault (14–6), Class AA, 2009

==== Girls Track and Field ====
- Lauren Zarger, 3200 Meter Run (10:34.99), Class AA, 2009

== Harbor Creek Junior High School ==
The junior high school currently serves grades 7 and 8. It is also located at the intersection of U.S. Route 20 (Buffalo Road) and PA Route 531 (Depot Road). While a separate building than the high school, it is connected to the high school via two corridors. The senior high school and junior high school share a cafeteria (located in the senior high school), but most student oriented activities for the schools occur in their own buildings.

== Clark Elementary School ==
Clark Elementary School currently serves students in grades K through 6. While the school services the largest geographic area compared to the other two elementary schools in Harborcreek, it is the smallest building in the district in terms of student population. The area of coverage for the school is most of the southern and eastern portion (from Troupe Road to North East Township) of the district, ranging from Lake Erie to the North, North East Township on the east and Greene Township to the south. The school is located on Depot Road, roughly 1.3 miles south of the High School/Junior High School, and about 1.1 miles north of Exit 35 on Interstate 90.

=== 2014-15 renovation ===
Clark Elementary School was closed during the 2014–15 school year for a multimillion-dollar renovation. Clark Elementary School classes were held at the former Wesleyville Elementary School during this time.

== Klein Elementary School ==
Klein Elementary School currently serves students in grades K through 6. Students living in the Northwest portion of Harborcreek Township, generally north of Buffalo Road and west of Troupe Road, attend this school. The school is located on East Lake Road, just south of Lake Erie.

=== 2006 flood ===
On the morning of Monday, September 25, 2006, over 300,000 gallons of water was discovered in the basement of Klein Elementary School. The cause was attributed to debris in the public water system that found its way into the backflow prevention valve located just inside of the building. While the valve functioned properly, due to its location within the building, it was left in an open position for an estimated 55 hours which was more than enough time to fill the basement. For an unknown reason, the circuit breakers did not trip, and when the water submerged all of the electrical panels, the electricity flow heated the water to about 105 degrees. As a result, all of the equipment in that area was destroyed, submerged under 14 feet of water. The building was immediately closed, and remained closed for about one month, while the students were moved to Rolling Ridge Elementary (K-4th grades) and the Junior High School (5th and 6th grades). The cost to the school district was nearly $250,000 to replace the destroyed equipment. Through the cooperation of area contractors, the building was able to reopen on Monday, October 23, 2006.

=== 2013-14 renovation ===
The Klein Elementary School building was closed during the 2013–14 school year for a $6 million renovation project. Upgrades include a new security system, a new heating and air conditioning system, new lighting, plumbing, flooring, furniture, windows and a new gymnasium. Classes were held in the former Wesleyville Elementary School building in neighboring Wesleyville during the renovation. The school was reopened for the 2014–15 school year.

== Rolling Ridge Elementary School ==
Rolling Ridge Elementary School currently serves students in grades K through 6. Students living in the Southwestern portion of Harborcreek Township, generally south of Buffalo Road and west of Clark Road, attend this school. This school is the largest elementary school in the district in terms of student population. The school is located on Ridge Parkway, just south of the Eastside YMCA and Buffalo Road, and in between Nagle and Saltsman Roads. The school was remodeled in 2001.
