= Italo Cappabianca =

American politician (1936–2001)

Italo S. Cappabianca

Member of the Pennsylvania House of Representatives from the 2nd district
- In office January 2, 1979 – May 28, 2001
- Preceded by: Robert E. Bellomini
- Succeeded by: Gayle Wright

Personal details
- Born: December 19, 1936 Erie, Pennsylvania
- Died: May 28, 2001 (aged 64)
- Party: Democratic
- Spouse: Linda Lou
- Education: Gannon University

Italo S. Cappabianca was a Democratic member of the Pennsylvania House of Representatives.

He graduated from Strong Vincent High School in Erie, Pennsylvania, in 1955 and earned a degree in political science from Gannon University in 1968. He was elected to represent the 2nd legislative district in 1978, following the resignation of Robert E. Bellomini. He married his wife Linda Lou Cappabianca late in life, and climbed Mount Kilimanjaro with two fellow legislators, Bill DeWeese and Frank Serafini.

He was diagnosed with brain cancer in the summer of 1999 and underwent an experimental gene therapy treatment at the University of Pittsburgh Cancer Institute. He died on May 28, 2001. Gannon University offers the "Italo S. Cappabianca Scholarship," an endowed scholarship in his name.

Linda Cappabianca lost the endorsement of the local Democratic committee to succeed her husband, losing to her former friend Gayle Wright. Mrs. Cappabianca explained that "[Wright] really didn't call me and discuss what she was going to do." She decided against mounting a formal write-in campaign, citing time constraints, but encouraged voters to write her in as an independent candidate. Wright won the August 14 contest with 48.2% of the vote, with Cappabianca placing a strong second place with 39.1%.
