= Gayle Wright =

American politician (born 1951)

Gayle M. Wright

Member of the Pennsylvania House of Representatives from the 2nd district
- In office September 5, 2001 – November 30, 2002
- Preceded by: Italo Cappabianca
- Succeeded by: Florindo Fabrizio

Personal details
- Born: February 3, 1951 (age 75) Port Huron, Michigan, U.S.
- Party: Democratic
- Spouse(s): Donald E. Wright, Jr.
- Children: 2 children
- Education: University of Akron

Gayle Marie Wright (born February 3, 1951) is a former Democratic member of the Pennsylvania House of Representatives from the 2nd district.

== Biography ==
Originally from Port Huron, Michigan, Wright attended Port Huron Northern High School, graduating in 1969. She earned a degree in education from the University of Akron and pursued graduate studies in correctional counseling at Gannon University.

Prior to elective office, she taught high school and middle school in Erie, Pennsylvania. She also served three terms on the Erie City Council, and was elected as city council president in 1997.

Wright was subsequently elected to represent the 2nd legislative district in the Pennsylvania House of Representatives in a special election on August 14, 2001, following the May 2001 death of Italo Cappabianca. She won a controversial endorsement by the local Democratic Committee over Cappabianca's widow, Linda. Cappabianca decided against mounting a formal write-in campaign, citing time constraints, but encouraged voters to write her in as an independent candidate. Wright won the August 14 contest with 48.2% of the vote, with Cappabianca placing second with 39.1%.

In 2002, Wright was named to the PoliticsPA list of Best Dressed Legislators.

She lost the 2002 Democratic primary election to Florindo Fabrizio.

Wright was elected as a delegate to the 2004 and 2008 Democratic National Convention.

== Electoral history ==
Pennsylvania 2nd State House District Special Election, 2001
| Party | Candidate | Votes | % |
|---|---|---|---|
| Democratic | Gayle M. Wright | 3,081 | 48.16 |
| Write-in | Linda Cappabianca | 2,499 | 39.06 |
| Republican | David B. Mumau | 758 | 11.85 |
| Write-in | Robert Morschhauser | 60 | 0.94 |
| Total votes | | 6,398 | 100.0 |

Pennsylvania 2nd State House District Democratic Primary, 2002
| Party | Candidate | Votes | % |
|---|---|---|---|
| Democratic | Florindo J. Fabrizio | 4,132 | 51.94 |
| Democratic | Gayle M. Wright (incumbent) | 3,823 | 48.06 |
| Total votes | | 7,955 | 100.0 |
