= Fairview School District =

School district in Pennsylvania

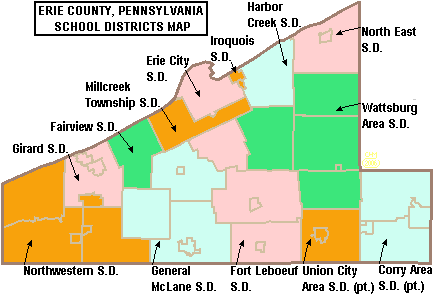

Location
- Erie, Pennsylvania; United States

District information
- Type: Public
- Motto: Developing the student in academics, athletics, and arts
- Established: 1810; 216 years ago

Students and staff
- Students: 1670
- Colors: Red and black

Other information
- Website: www.fairviewschools.org

Fairview School District is a school district located in affluent Fairview Township, which is located in metropolitan Erie County, Pennsylvania, United States. The overall population of the district is about 1800 students, faculty, administrators, and other workers.

== History ==
The first actual school building was made in 1804, which was a log building. Fairview's first teacher was John Linn. A real school was built in 1810, specifically as a school, along U.S. Route 20.

During the mid-20th century, a two-story structure called the Union School replaced three other smaller buildings and housed all the children from the borough area. This school was burned and then rebuilt in 1891. In 1895, this building became the first in Erie County to offer an upper level system. By 1909, a complete 4 year high school education was available to the students of Fairview.

A new school was built was 1905, called South High. South High offered grades 1-9. One-room buildings outside Fairview had been replaced by larger brick buildings in the 4 quadrants of Fairview.

In 1927, a new joint high school had been approved with help by the Lake Shore B, built on Chestnut Street. This new school incorporated Fairview Students as well as Girard Students.

When this school was built, this is when Fairview first started to achieve in extracurricular activities. It created its first football team in 1927, and in 1935, a gym was added to the school. The music program was created in 1940, and the marching band soon followed in 1941. Eventually, an elementary wing would be added onto the Chestnut School.

In 1958, a new elementary school was built, and it still included Girard Students. The Manchester Elementary School was modern, but had to accommodate Girard students as well. Eventually, Girard built its own school, and soon, the Chestnut School was made into a total elementary school. Renovations and additions would be made to the elementary schools throughout the 1960s and 1970s. For a short duration during the 1960s, Northwestern students were brought into the Fairview School District, but quickly went their own way.

In 1968, Fairview and Girard were about to merge into a single school, but in 1970, the state decided to keep the school districts separate. Fairview High School was built in 1973, and the Garwood building was converted into a middle school. Manchester building was eventually sold.

In 1996, a new elementary school was built next to the Middle School. In 2002-2003, Garwood Middle School went under extreme renovations, and was completely renewed. Eventually, in 2004, Garwood changed its name to Fairview Middle School.

=== Fairview High School ===
Fairview High School is a high school located in Fairview Township, Pennsylvania. It is a public, co-educational school for the area, and has a current population of 568 students.

=== Fairview Middle School ===
Fairview Middle School is a middle school for grades 5-8, also located in Fairview Middle School. Fairview Middle School is also co-educational, and has about 580 students.

=== Fairview Elementary School ===
Fairview Elementary School is a school for kids kindergarten through 4th grade. It has a population of 522 students, and is a co-educational, public school.
