= 1956 United States presidential election in Pennsylvania =

- November 6, 1956

Nominee	Dwight D. Eisenhower	Adlai Stevenson
Party	Republican	Democratic
Home state	Pennsylvania (Note: Although he was born in Texas and grew up in Kansas before his military career, at the time of the 1952 election Eisenhower was president of Columbia University and was, officially, a resident of New York. During his first term as president, he moved his private residence to Gettysburg, Pennsylvania, and officially changed his residency to Pennsylvania.)	Illinois
Running mate	Richard Nixon	Estes Kefauver
Electoral vote	32	0
Popular vote	2,585,252	1,981,769
Percentage	56.49%	43.30%
County results
Eisenhower
50–60%
60–70%
70–80%
Stevenson
50–60%
President before election
Dwight D. Eisenhower
Republican
Elected President
Dwight D. Eisenhower
Republican

The 1956 United States presidential election in Pennsylvania took place on November 6, 1956, as part of the 1956 United States presidential election. Voters chose 32 representatives, or electors to the Electoral College, who voted for president and vice president.

Pennsylvania strongly voted for the Republican nominee, President Dwight D. Eisenhower, over the Democratic nominee, former Illinois Governor Adlai Stevenson. Pennsylvania was the home state of President Eisenhower, as he moved to the Gettysburg area after World War II. Eisenhower won Pennsylvania by a solid 13.19% margin, and carried every county except Philadelphia and four heavily unionized coal counties in the southwestern "Black Country". This result nonetheless made Pennsylvania 2.21% more Democratic than the nation-at-large.

This was the last time Pennsylvania voted for a Republican presidential candidate until Eisenhower's vice president, Richard Nixon, won the state in his re-election bid in 1972.

== Results ==
1956 United States presidential election in Pennsylvania
Party	Candidate	Votes	Percentage	Electoral votes
Republican	Dwight D. Eisenhower (incumbent)	2,585,252	56.49%	32
Democratic	Adlai Stevenson	1,981,769	43.30%	0
Socialist Labor	Eric Hass	7,447	0.16%	0
Militant Workers	Farrell Dobbs	2,035	0.04%	0

=== Results by county ===
County	Dwight D. Eisenhower Republican		Adlai Stevenson Democratic		Various candidates Other parties		Margin		Total votes cast
County	#	%	#	%	#	%	#	%	Total votes cast
Adams	12,250	66.11%	6,281	33.89%	0	0.00%	5,969	32.22%	18,531
Allegheny	384,939	54.83%	315,989	45.01%	1,102	0.16%	68,950	9.82%	702,030
Armstrong	20,055	61.22%	12,671	38.68%	34	0.10%	7,384	22.54%	32,760
Beaver	38,263	51.21%	36,373	48.68%	79	0.11%	1,890	2.53%	74,715
Bedford	11,423	65.37%	6,038	34.55%	13	0.07%	5,385	30.82%	17,474
Berks	57,258	57.30%	42,349	42.38%	320	0.32%	14,909	14.92%	99,927
Blair	33,623	65.68%	17,503	34.19%	65	0.13%	16,120	31.49%	51,191
Bradford	15,399	73.57%	5,502	26.29%	30	0.14%	9,897	47.28%	20,931
Bucks	59,862	60.72%	38,541	39.09%	180	0.18%	21,321	21.63%	98,583
Butler	26,238	65.61%	13,672	34.19%	79	0.20%	12,566	31.42%	39,989
Cambria	46,373	52.55%	41,753	47.31%	123	0.14%	4,620	5.24%	88,249
Cameron	2,462	74.52%	841	25.45%	1	0.03%	1,621	49.07%	3,304
Carbon	13,150	57.27%	9,722	42.34%	89	0.39%	3,428	14.93%	22,961
Centre	15,412	67.18%	7,483	32.62%	45	0.20%	7,929	34.56%	22,940
Chester	47,225	70.24%	19,957	29.68%	50	0.07%	27,268	40.56%	67,232
Clarion	10,048	66.94%	4,955	33.01%	8	0.05%	5,093	33.93%	15,011
Clearfield	17,519	57.51%	12,852	42.19%	89	0.29%	4,667	15.32%	30,460
Clinton	8,250	60.32%	5,411	39.56%	17	0.12%	2,839	20.76%	13,678
Columbia	13,382	59.69%	9,024	40.25%	15	0.07%	4,358	19.44%	22,421
Crawford	18,887	66.65%	9,346	32.98%	104	0.37%	9,541	33.67%	28,337
Cumberland	29,468	68.10%	13,651	31.55%	153	0.35%	15,817	36.55%	43,272
Dauphin	61,342	67.45%	29,226	32.14%	375	0.41%	32,116	35.31%	90,943
Delaware	143,663	63.51%	82,024	36.26%	523	0.23%	61,639	27.25%	226,210
Elk	8,947	61.84%	5,498	38.00%	23	0.16%	3,449	23.84%	14,468
Erie	54,430	61.46%	33,802	38.17%	323	0.36%	20,628	23.29%	88,555
Fayette	27,857	41.97%	38,312	57.72%	206	0.31%	-10,455	-15.75%	66,375
Forest	1,535	71.13%	622	28.82%	1	0.05%	913	42.31%	2,158
Franklin	19,121	63.33%	11,060	36.63%	12	0.04%	8,061	26.70%	30,193
Fulton	2,370	56.50%	1,819	43.36%	6	0.14%	551	13.14%	4,195
Greene	7,562	43.45%	9,827	56.47%	14	0.08%	-2,265	-13.02%	17,403
Huntingdon	9,698	67.66%	4,618	32.22%	17	0.12%	5,080	35.44%	14,333
Indiana	18,593	62.27%	11,268	37.73%	0	0.00%	7,325	24.54%	29,861
Jefferson	13,051	66.26%	6,627	33.64%	19	0.10%	6,424	32.62%	19,697
Juniata	4,258	60.45%	2,779	39.45%	7	0.10%	1,479	21.00%	7,044
Lackawanna	64,386	53.56%	55,741	46.37%	79	0.07%	8,645	7.19%	120,206
Lancaster	69,026	72.05%	26,538	27.70%	237	0.25%	42,488	44.35%	95,801
Lawrence	25,037	55.61%	19,923	44.25%	65	0.14%	5,114	11.36%	45,025
Lebanon	22,556	68.35%	10,406	31.53%	41	0.12%	12,150	36.82%	33,003
Lehigh	50,564	63.30%	29,067	36.39%	251	0.31%	21,497	26.91%	79,882
Luzerne	92,458	58.22%	65,155	41.02%	1,207	0.76%	27,303	17.20%	158,820
Lycoming	27,030	66.67%	13,490	33.28%	20	0.05%	13,540	33.39%	40,540
McKean	14,725	73.81%	5,152	25.82%	73	0.37%	9,573	47.99%	19,950
Mercer	28,785	59.14%	19,769	40.62%	120	0.25%	9,016	18.52%	48,674
Mifflin	8,638	62.94%	5,078	37.00%	9	0.07%	3,560	25.94%	13,725
Monroe	10,081	64.30%	5,506	35.12%	92	0.59%	4,575	29.18%	15,679
Montgomery	133,270	69.20%	59,095	30.69%	218	0.11%	74,175	38.51%	192,583
Montour	3,976	65.71%	2,072	34.24%	3	0.05%	1,904	31.47%	6,051
Northampton	43,375	55.83%	33,749	43.44%	573	0.74%	9,626	12.39%	77,697
Northumberland	28,583	62.46%	17,141	37.45%	41	0.09%	11,442	25.01%	45,765
Perry	7,511	67.59%	3,576	32.18%	25	0.22%	3,935	35.41%	11,112
Philadelphia	383,414	42.97%	507,289	56.85%	1,618	0.18%	-123,875	-13.88%	892,321
Pike	4,160	77.28%	1,219	22.65%	4	0.07%	2,941	54.63%	5,383
Potter	5,181	69.45%	2,257	30.25%	22	0.29%	2,924	39.20%	7,460
Schuylkill	51,670	61.95%	31,645	37.94%	91	0.11%	20,025	24.01%	83,406
Snyder	7,102	78.35%	1,959	21.61%	3	0.03%	5,143	56.74%	9,064
Somerset	20,568	60.95%	13,163	39.00%	17	0.05%	7,405	21.95%	33,748
Sullivan	2,007	60.87%	1,286	39.01%	4	0.12%	721	21.86%	3,297
Susquehanna	10,752	71.42%	4,293	28.52%	10	0.07%	6,459	42.90%	15,055
Tioga	10,827	76.72%	3,280	23.24%	6	0.04%	7,547	53.48%	14,113
Union	6,620	78.08%	1,844	21.75%	14	0.17%	4,776	56.33%	8,478
Venango	17,107	75.31%	5,594	24.63%	14	0.06%	11,513	50.68%	22,715
Warren	12,145	72.94%	4,463	26.80%	43	0.26%	7,682	46.14%	16,651
Washington	39,465	45.04%	48,052	54.84%	98	0.11%	-8,587	-9.80%	87,615
Wayne	9,658	75.64%	3,092	24.22%	18	0.14%	6,566	51.42%	12,768
Westmoreland	66,580	47.77%	72,616	52.10%	192	0.14%	-6,036	-4.33%	139,388
Wyoming	5,906	73.56%	2,120	26.40%	3	0.04%	3,786	47.16%	8,029
York	48,176	55.33%	38,743	44.50%	149	0.17%	9,433	10.83%	87,068
Totals	2,585,252	56.49%	1,981,769	43.30%	9,482	0.21%	603,483	13.19%	4,576,503

==== Counties that flipped from Democratic to Republican ====
- Alleghany
- Beaver
- Cambria
- Lackawanna

== See also ==
- United States presidential elections in Pennsylvania
