= Paul J. Weitz =

American astronaut (1932–2017)

Paul Weitz
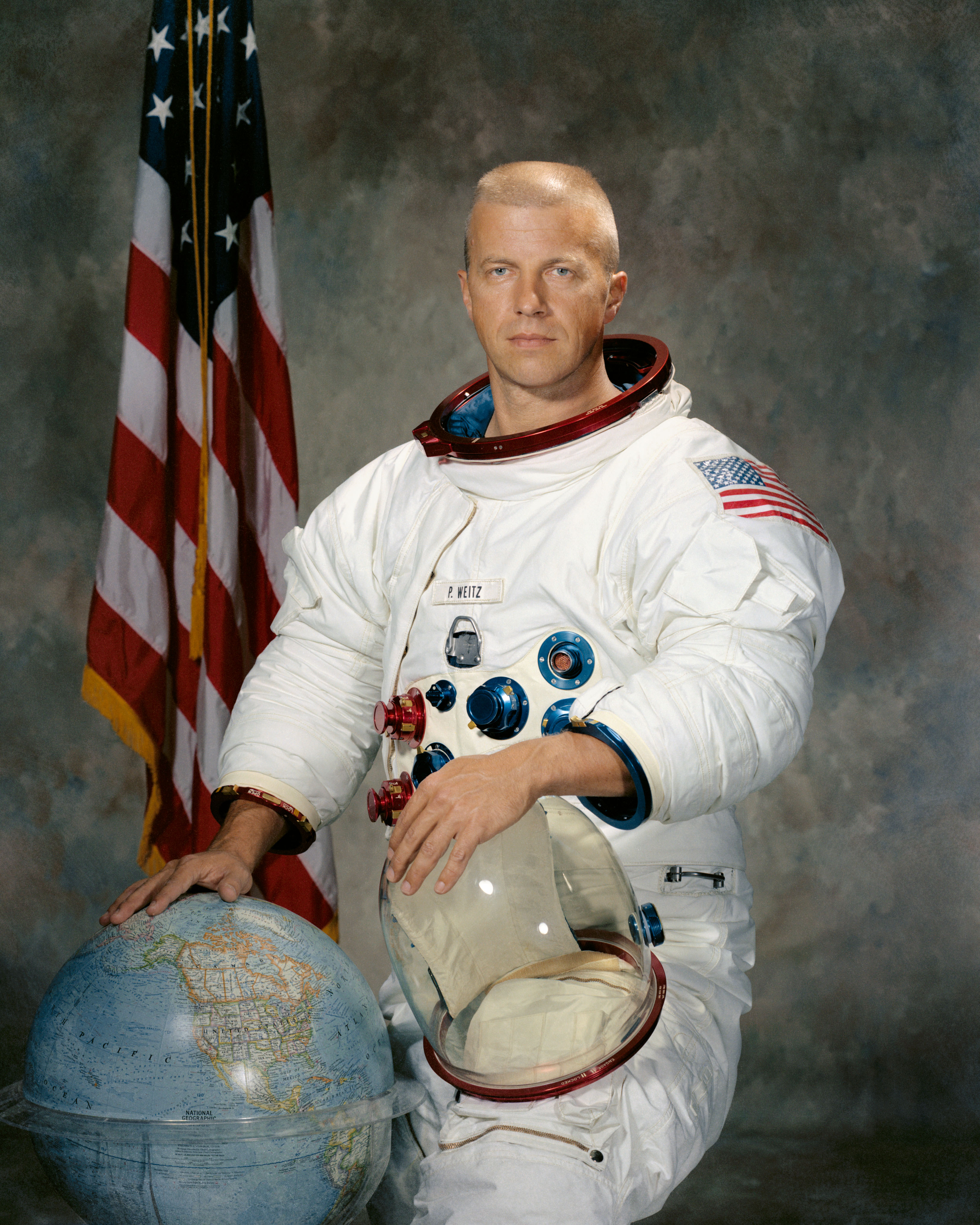
- Weitz in 1971
- Born: Paul Joseph Weitz; July 25, 1932; Erie, Pennsylvania, U.S.
- Died: October 22, 2017 (aged 85); Flagstaff, Arizona, U.S.
- Education: Pennsylvania State University (BS); Naval Postgraduate School (MS)
- Awards: NASA Distinguished Service Medal; Air Medal
- Space career

NASA astronaut
- Rank: Captain, USN
- Time in space: 33d 1h 13m
- Selection: NASA Group 5 (1966)
- Total EVAs: 2
- Total EVA time: 2h 16m
- Mission: Skylab 2 STS-6
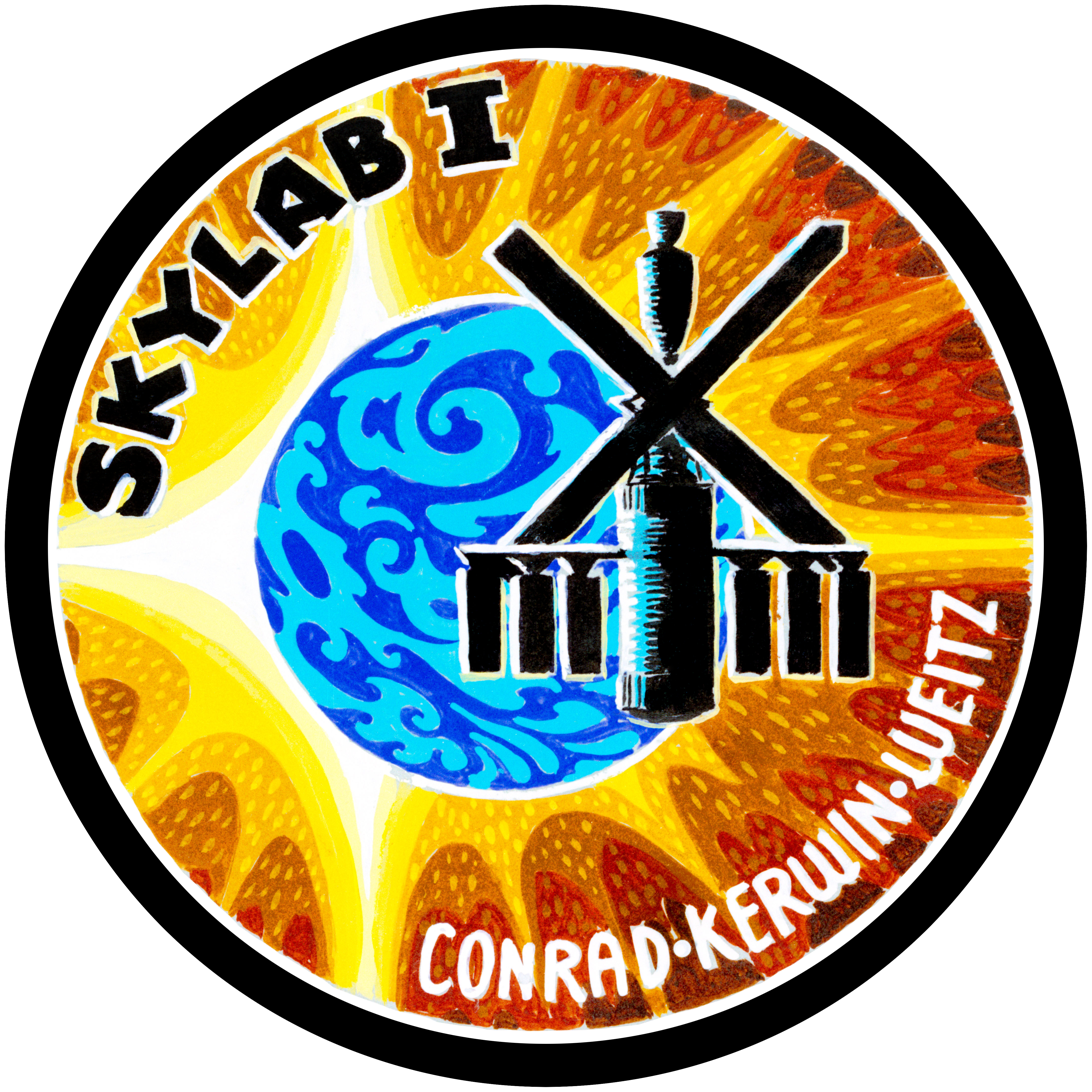
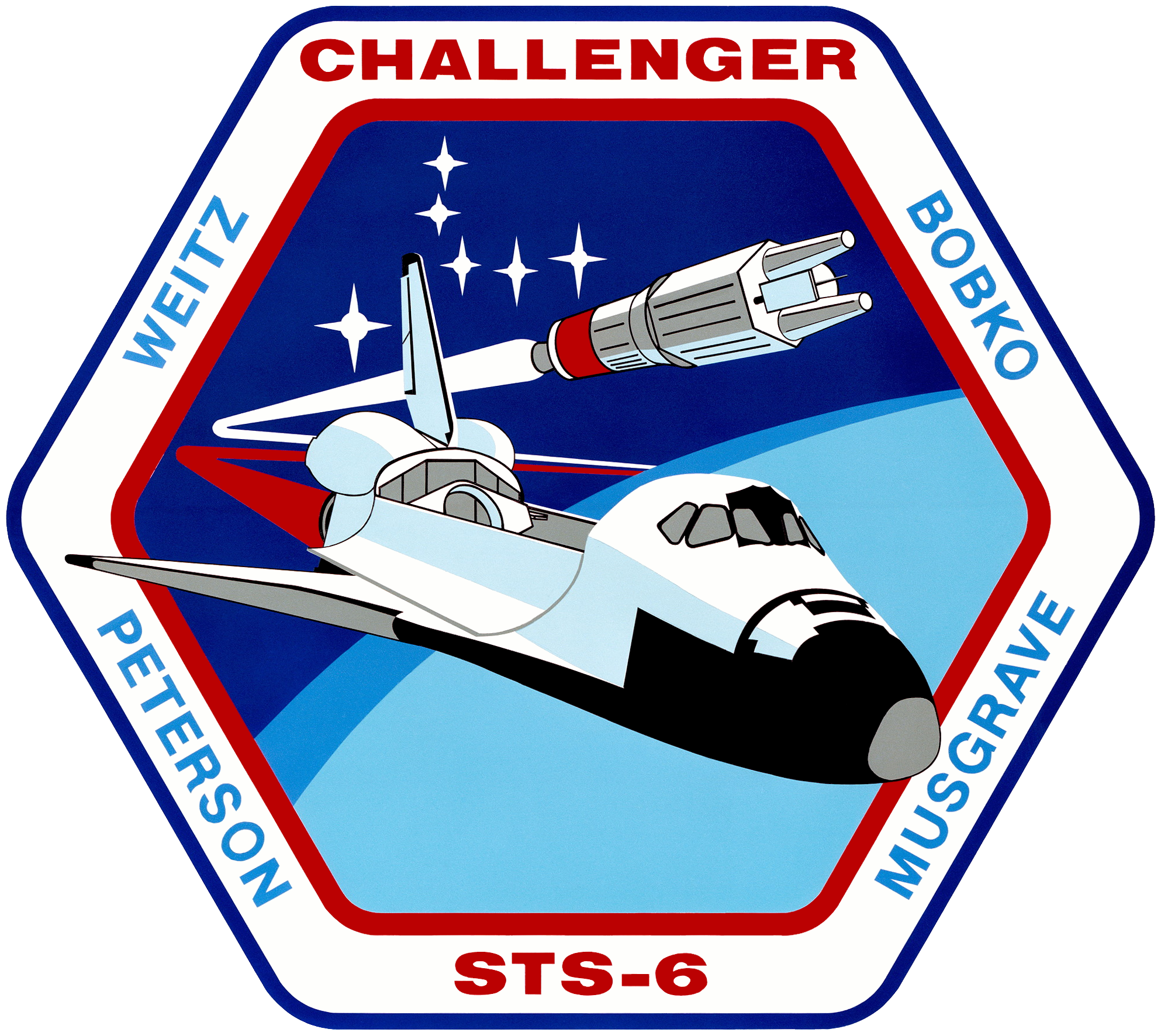
- Mission insignia
- Retired: May 1994

Paul Joseph Weitz (July 25, 1932 – October 22, 2017) was an American naval officer and aviator, aeronautical engineer, test pilot, and NASA astronaut, who flew into space twice. He was a member of the three-man crew who flew on Skylab 2, the first crewed Skylab mission. He was also commander of the STS-6 mission, the maiden flight of the Space Shuttle Challenger.

== Biography ==
Paul J. Weitz was born in 1932 in Erie, Pennsylvania, United States. He went on to complete a master's degree in engineering and was a pilot in the Navy. He went on to be an astronaut who went in to space aboard Skylab and the Space Shuttle, later serving as a NASA official.

=== Early years and education ===
Weitz was born in Erie, Pennsylvania, on July 25, 1932. After attending McKinley Elementary School, he graduated from Harbor Creek High School in Harborcreek, Pennsylvania, in 1949 as Valedictorian. The high school stadium was later named after him. He received a Bachelor of Science degree in Aeronautical Engineering from Pennsylvania State University in 1954. While attending Penn State, he was a member of the Alpha Upsilon chapter of Beta Theta Pi. Ten years later, he received a Master of Science degree in Aeronautical Engineering from the U.S. Naval Postgraduate School in Monterey, California.

=== Flight experience ===
Weitz received his commission as an ensign through the Naval ROTC program at Penn State. He served for one year at sea aboard a destroyer before going to flight training and was awarded his aviator wings in September 1956. He served in various naval aircraft squadrons until he was selected as an astronaut in 1966. He logged more than 7,700 hours flying time—6,400 hours in jet aircraft.

=== NASA career ===
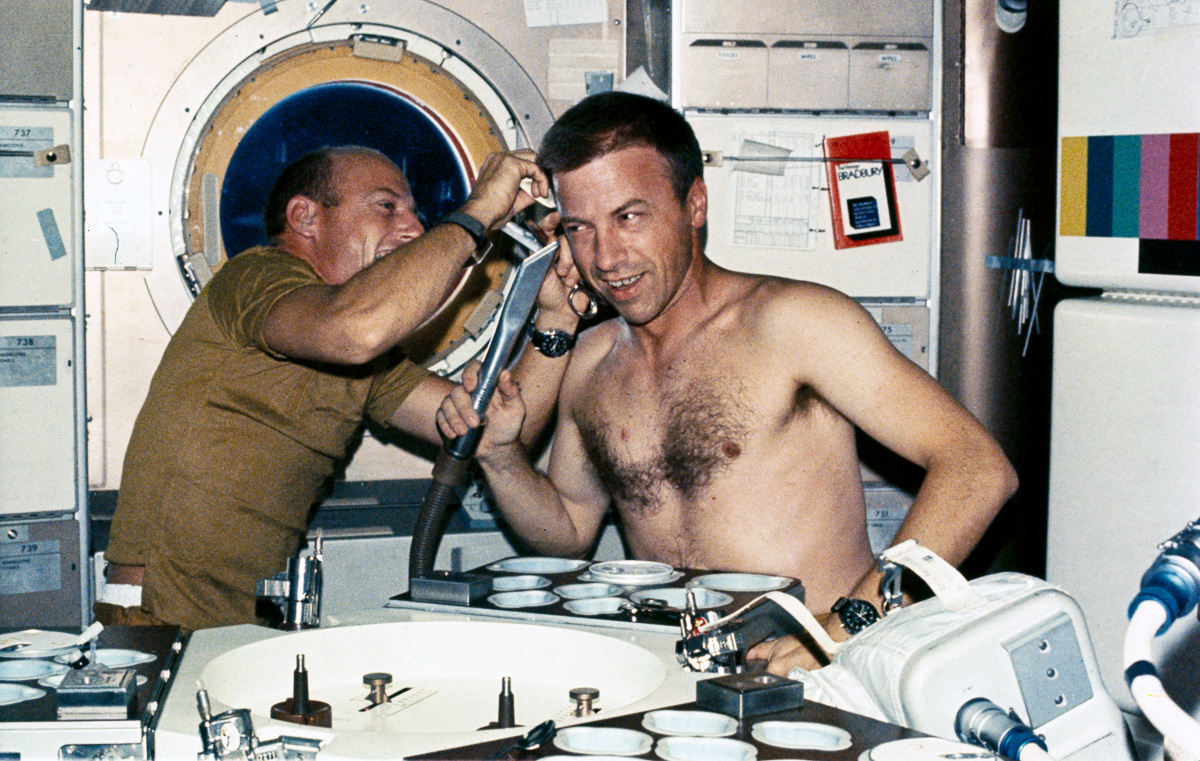
Skylab 2 Commander Pete Conrad trims Weitz's hair in Skylab's crew quarters

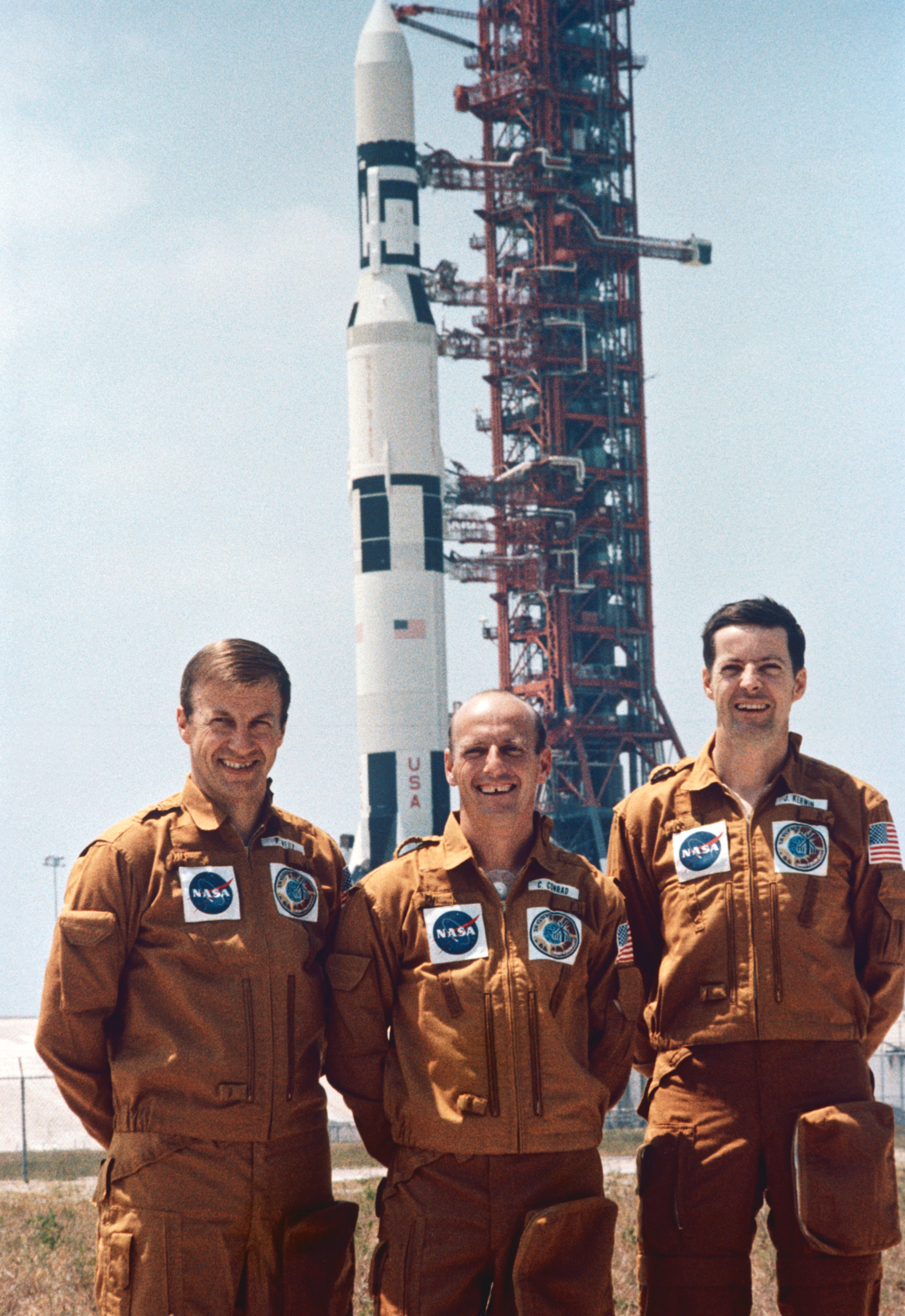
Paul J. Weitz, (left) Charles "Pete" Conrad Jr. (middle); and Joseph P. Kerwin (right); America's first space station crew would spend 28 days in space

In April 1966, Weitz was one of 19 men selected by NASA for Astronaut Group 5. He served as pilot on the crew of Skylab 2 (SL-2), which launched on May 25 and splashed down on June 22, 1973. SL-2 was the first crewed Skylab mission. The mission lasted for 28 days, a record at the time. Weitz and his two crewmates, Pete Conrad and Joseph Kerwin, performed extensive and unprecedented repairs to serious damage that Skylab sustained during its uncrewed launch, salvaging the entire Skylab mission. Weitz logged two hours and 11 minutes of EVA during the mission. If NASA followed typical crew rotations, Weitz may have been assigned as Command Module Pilot for the canceled Apollo 20 mission.

In 1976 Weitz retired from NASA and went back to the Navy, but he returned to NASA to fly the maiden spaceflight of the Challenger at over 50 years old.

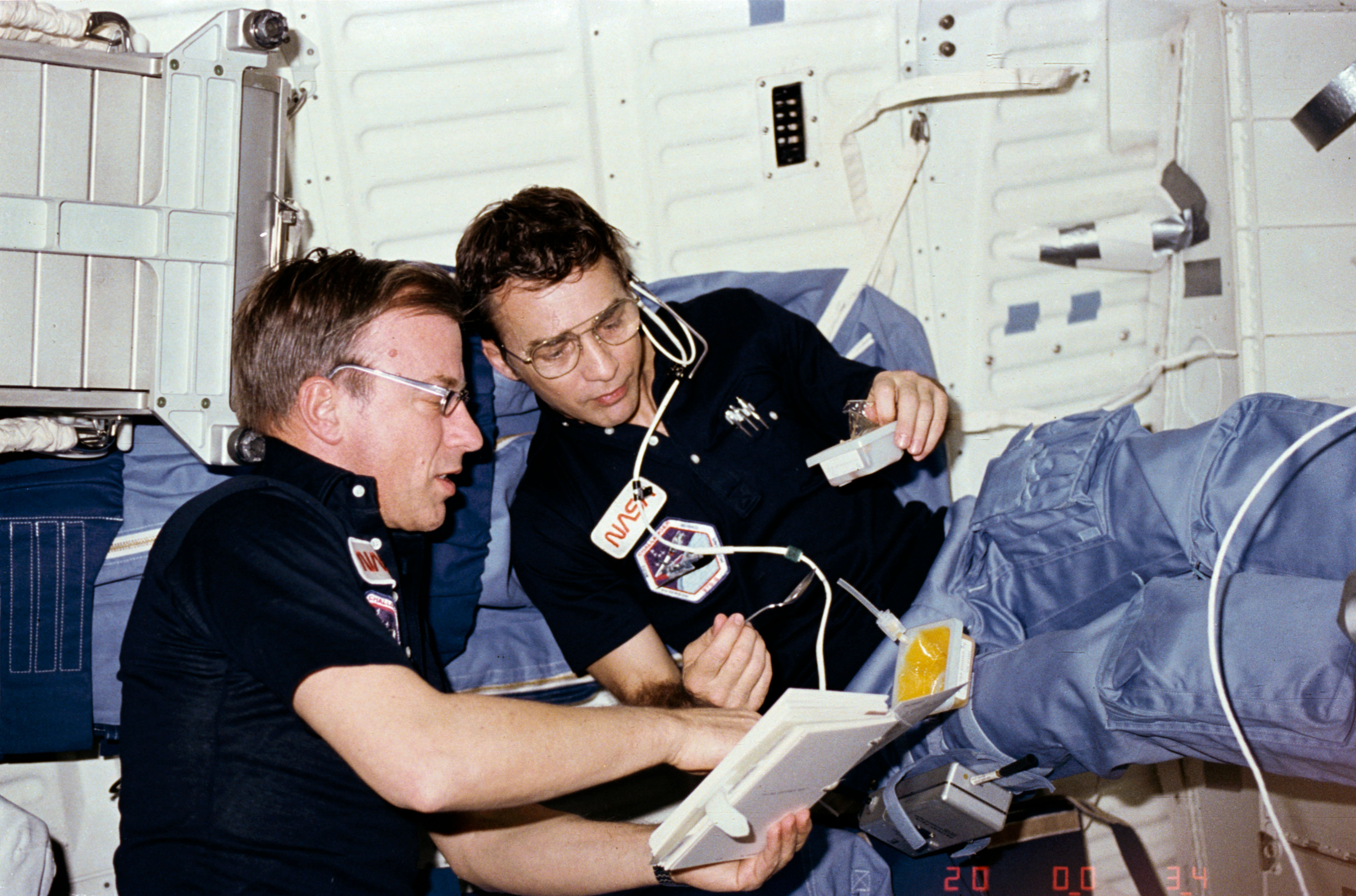
Weitz and Donald H. Peterson (right) aboard Space Shuttle Challenger during the STS-6 mission

Weitz was spacecraft commander on the crew of STS-6, which launched from Kennedy Space Center, Florida, on April 4, 1983. This was the maiden voyage of the orbiter Challenger. During the mission, the crew conducted numerous experiments in materials processing, recorded lightning activities, deployed IUS/TDRS-A, conducted extravehicular activity while testing a variety of support systems and equipment in preparation for future spacewalks, and also carried three Getaway Specials. Mission duration was 120 hours before Challenger landed on a concrete runway at Edwards Air Force Base, California, on April 9, 1983. With the completion of this flight, Weitz logged a total of 793 hours in space.

Weitz was Deputy Director of the Johnson Space Center when he retired from NASA in May 1994.

=== Personal life and death ===
Weitz married the former Suzanne M. Berry of Harborcreek, Pennsylvania. They had two children.

Hunting and fishing were among his hobbies.

After retiring, Weitz lived in Arizona until his death on October 22, 2017, from myelodysplastic syndrome at the age of 85.

== Organizations ==
- Fellow, American Astronautical Society
- Master Mason, Lawrence Lodge 708, Erie, Pennsylvania

== Awards and honors ==
Awarded the:

- Navy Astronaut Wings
- Navy Distinguished Service Medal
- Air Medal (5)
- Navy Commendation Medal (for combat flights in Vietnam)
- NASA Distinguished Service Medal
- NASA Space Flight Medal
- Los Angeles Chamber of Commerce Kitty Hawk Award (1973)
- Pennsylvania State University Alumni Association's Distinguished Alumni Award
- Named a Pennsylvania State University Alumni Fellow (1974)
- AIAA Haley Astronautics Award for 1974
- Fédération Aéronautique Internationale's V. M. Komarov Diploma for 1973 (1974)
- 1974 Harmon International Aviation Trophy for Astronaut (1975)
- 1984 Harmon International Award (1989)

The three Skylab astronaut crews were awarded the 1973 Robert J. Collier Trophy "For proving beyond question the value of man in future explorations of space and the production of data of benefit to all the people on Earth." Gerald Carr accepted the 1975 Dr. Robert H. Goddard Memorial Trophy from President Ford, awarded to the Skylab astronauts. He was one of 24 Apollo astronauts who were inducted into the U.S. Astronaut Hall of Fame in 1997.

== See also ==
- Delaware lunar sample displays
- The Astronaut Monument
