= Florindo Fabrizio =

American politician (1944–2018)

Member of the Pennsylvania House of Representatives from the 2nd district
- In office January 7, 2003 – July 24, 2018
- Preceded by: Gayle Wright
- Succeeded by: Robert Merski

Personal details
- Born: November 1, 1944 Erie, Pennsylvania, U.S.
- Died: July 24, 2018 (aged 73) Erie, Pennsylvania, U.S.
- Party: Democratic
- Spouse: Victoria Fabrizio
- Education: Penn State University; Edinboro University
- Profession: Educator, Stockbroker

Florindo J. Fabrizio (November 1, 1944 – July 24, 2018) was an American politician, Democratic member of the Pennsylvania House of Representatives, representing the 2nd District. He was elected in 2002 and served until his death on July 24, 2018.
