= Erie County, Pennsylvania =

County in Pennsylvania, United States

- County
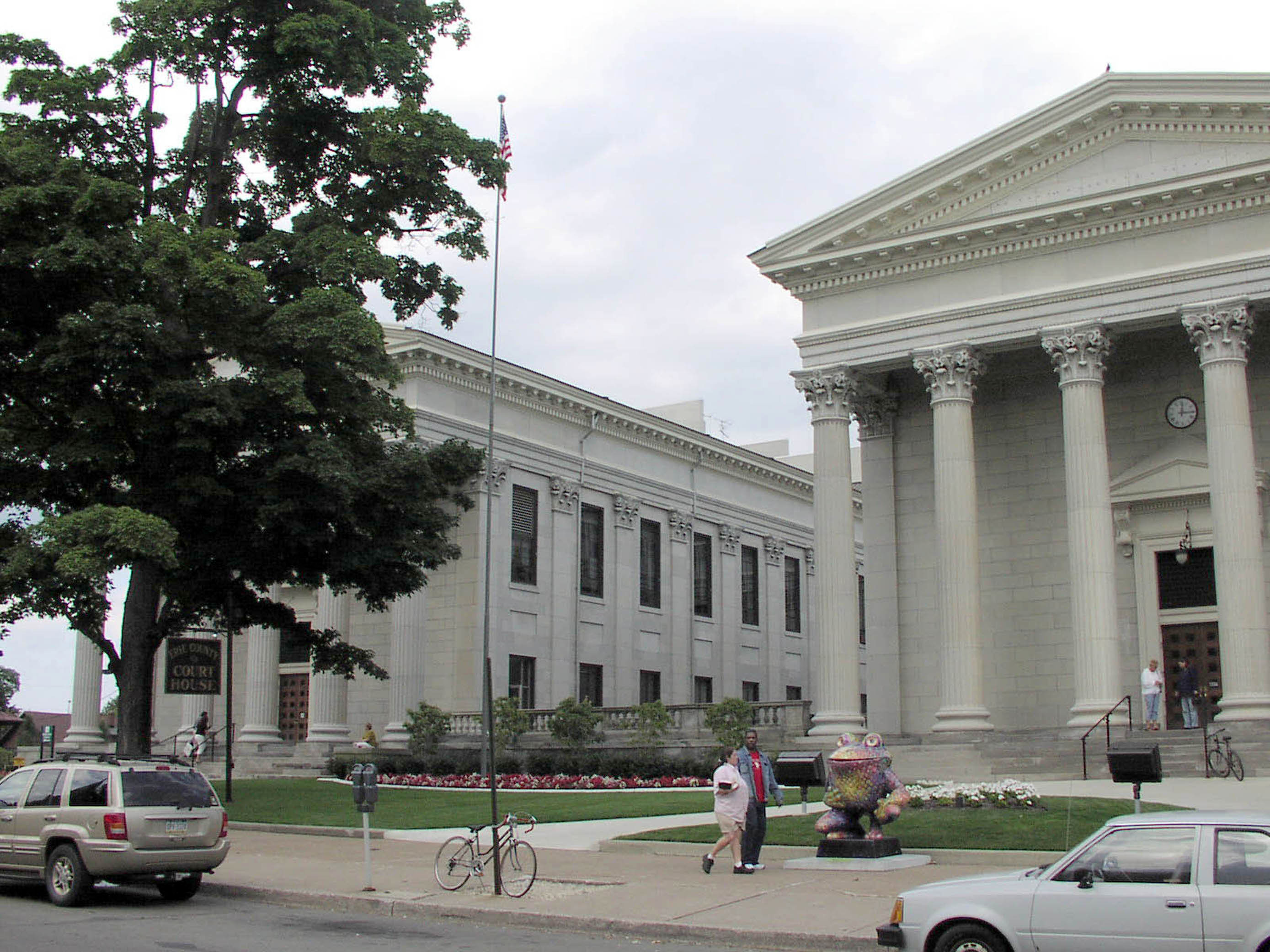
- Erie Federal Courthouse in Erie, Pennsylvania

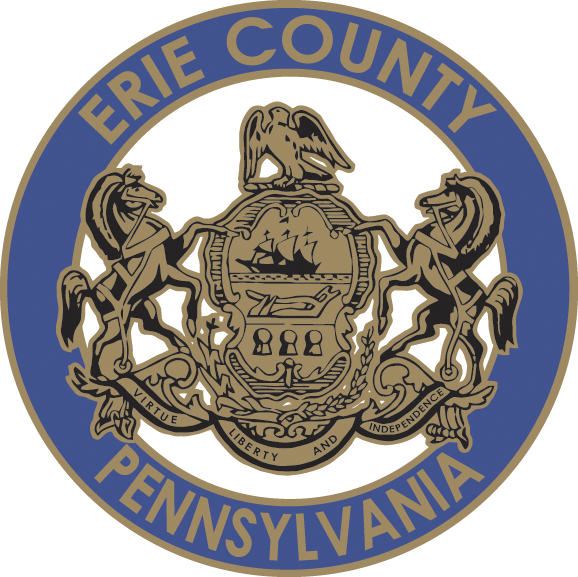
- Flag Seal

- Location within the U.S. state of Pennsylvania
- Coordinates: 42°06′N 80°06′W
- Country: United States
- State: Pennsylvania
- Founded: November 7, 1803
- Named for: Erie people
- Seat: Erie
- Largest city: Erie

Government
  - County Executive: Christina Vogel (D)

Area
  - Total: 1,558 sq mi (4,040 km^{2})
  - Land: 799 sq mi (2,070 km^{2})
  - Water: 759 sq mi (1,970 km^{2}) 49%

Population (2020)
  - Total: 270,876
  - Estimate (2025): 265,832 ▼
  - Density: 339.1/sq mi (130.9/km^{2})
- Time zone: UTC−5 (Eastern)
  - Summer (DST): UTC−4 (EDT)
- Congressional district: 16th
- Website: eriecountypa.gov

Erie County is the northernmost county in the Commonwealth of Pennsylvania. As of the 2025 census estimate, the population was 265,832. Its county seat is Erie. The county was created in 1800 and later organized in 1803. The county is part of the Northwest region of the commonwealth. (Note: Includes Erie, Mercer, Crawford, and Venango Counties)

== History ==
The federal government resolved competing claims over the Erie Triangle in 1792, allowing Pennsylvania to purchase the land. Before the resolution, both New York and Pennsylvania had claimed the territory, preventing the formation of county boundaries. On March 12, 1800, Pennsylvania established Erie County from a portion of Allegheny County, which had absorbed the Erie Triangle following the acquisition. Other states attempted to claim the region, but Pennsylvania ultimately secured the area through formal cession.

Because Erie County and its neighboring counties—Crawford, Mercer, Venango, and Warren—initially lacked the population and resources to sustain independent governments, state officials established a temporary five-county administrative unit based in Meadville, Crawford County, to manage regional affairs. Erie County elected its first local officials in 1803. A fire destroyed the Erie County Courthouse on March 23, 1823, erasing all county records accumulated up to that date.

Immigrants of "Yankee" stock—descendants of English Puritans who originally settled New England—first settled Erie County. These early settlers primarily came from Connecticut, Rhode Island, and Maine, often via Upstate New York. They made Erie County culturally similar to New England rather than to the rest of Pennsylvania. They laid out roads, established post routes, constructed public buildings, and encouraged further migration. Many settlers from upstate New York had only recently relocated there from New England following the American Revolutionary War, creating a strong cultural continuity with early New England.

Erie County was part of the Underground Railroad, giving slaves the ability to gain freedom through Lake Erie into Canada, East through New York State, or to stay in Erie with the help of abolitionists and the free black community.

== Geography ==
According to the U.S. Census Bureau, the county has a total area of 1,558 square miles (4,040 km^{2}), of which 799 square miles (2,070 km^{2}) is land and 759 square miles (1,970 km^{2}) (49%) is water. It is the largest county in Pennsylvania by total area. Except for a high ridge several miles from the lake, running nearly parallel to its shore, the terrain is generally rolling and well-watered. It is the only county in the state that occupies a significant amount of land north of the 42nd parallel.

There are two cities in Erie County: Erie and Corry. Other notable population centers include Millcreek, Harborcreek, Summit, and Fairview townships, as well as the boroughs of Edinboro, North East, Girard, Waterford, and Union City. Erie County is bordered on the northeast by Chautauqua County, New York, on the east by Warren County, on the south by Crawford County, and on the west by Ashtabula County, Ohio. Directly north of the county is Lake Erie. Erie County occupies a position on Lake Erie that makes it the only county in Pennsylvania to share a border with Canada, located across the lake on the far shore.

Most of the county has a warm-summer humid continental climate (Dfb), except at lower elevations near enough to the lake, where a hot-summer humid continental climate (Dfa) exists. Average monthly temperatures in downtown Erie range from 26.4 °F in January to 70.8 °F in July, while in Corry, they range from 23.8 °F in January to 68.2 °F in July. The hardiness zone in most of Erie County by area is 6a. It has warmed to 7a along the Lake, and the area between the shore and a line a little south of Interstate 90 is 6b.

Because of its location in the northwesternmost part of the state, Erie County is the only county to border both New York and Ohio. It is also the only county in the state on the Canadian border.

=== Adjacent counties ===
- Haldimand County, Ontario (north) (separated by Lake Erie)
- Chautauqua County, New York (northeast)
- Warren County (southeast)
- Crawford County (south)
- Ashtabula County, Ohio (southwest)
- Norfolk County, Ontario (northwest) (separated by Lake Erie)

=== Major highways ===
- I-79
- I-86
- I-90
- US 6
- US 6N
- US 19
- US 20
- PA 5
- PA 5 Alt.
- PA 8
- PA 18
- PA 77
- PA 89
- PA 97
- PA 98
- PA 99
- PA 215
- PA 226
- PA 290
- PA 426
- PA 430
- PA 474
- PA 505
- PA 531
- PA 832

== Demographics ==
Historical population
Census	Pop.	Note	%±
1800	1,468		—
1810	3,758		156.0%
1820	8,553		127.6%
1830	17,041		99.2%
1840	31,344		83.9%
1850	38,742		23.6%
1860	49,432		27.6%
1870	65,973		33.5%
1880	74,688		13.2%
1890	86,074		15.2%
1900	98,473		14.4%
1910	115,517		17.3%
1920	153,536		32.9%
1930	175,277		14.2%
1940	180,889		3.2%
1950	219,388		21.3%
1960	250,682		14.3%
1970	263,654		5.2%
1980	279,780		6.1%
1990	275,572		−1.5%
2000	280,845		1.9%
2010	280,566		−0.1%
2020	270,876		−3.5%
2025 (est.)	265,832	▼	−1.9%

=== Racial and ethnic composition ===
Erie County, Pennsylvania – Racial and ethnic composition Note: the US Census treats Hispanic/Latino as an ethnic category. This table excludes Latinos from the racial categories and assigns them to a separate category. Hispanics/Latinos may be of any race.
Race / Ethnicity (NH = Non-Hispanic)	Pop 1980	Pop 1990	Pop 2000	Pop 2010	Pop 2020	% 1980	% 1990	% 2000	% 2010	% 2020
White alone (NH)	263,703	256,177	252,258	242,787	219,180	94.25%	92.96%	89.82%	86.53%	80.92%
Black or African American alone (NH)	12,298	14,008	16,876	19,485	19,821	4.40%	5.08%	6.01%	6.94%	7.32%
Native American or Alaska Native alone (NH)	332	417	396	447	343	0.12%	0.15%	0.14%	0.16%	0.13%
Asian alone (NH)	974	1,374	1,902	3,036	6,358	0.35%	0.50%	0.68%	1.08%	2.35%
Native Hawaiian or Pacific Islander alone (NH)	x	x	56	72	58	x	x	0.02%	0.03%	0.02%
Other race alone (NH)	423	232	320	292	1,046	0.15%	0.08%	0.11%	0.10%	0.39%
Mixed race or Multiracial (NH)	x	x	2,909	4,929	12,040	x	x	1.04%	1.76%	4.44%
Hispanic or Latino (any race)	2,050	3,364	6,126	9,518	12,030	0.73%	1.22%	2.18%	3.39%	4.44%
Total	279,780	275,572	280,843	280,566	270,876	100.00%	100.00%	100.00%	100.00%	100.00%

=== 2020 census ===
As of the 2020 census, Erie County had a population of 270,876, with 109,371 households and 66,504 families. The median age was 40.6 years; 20.9% of residents were under the age of 18 and 19.0% were 65 years of age or older. For every 100 females there were 97.7 males, and for every 100 females age 18 and over there were 96.1 males age 18 and over.

Of the 109,371 households, 26.8% had children under the age of 18 living in them. Of all households, 42.7% were married-couple households, 20.5% were households with a male householder and no spouse or partner present, and 29.0% were households with a female householder and no spouse or partner present. About 31.3% of all households were made up of individuals and 13.3% had someone living alone who was 65 years of age or older.

There were 119,791 housing units, of which 8.7% were vacant. Among occupied housing units, 65.8% were owner-occupied and 34.2% were renter-occupied. The homeowner vacancy rate was 1.3% and the rental vacancy rate was 8.5%.

76.0% of residents lived in urban areas, while 24.0% lived in rural areas.

The racial makeup of the county was 82.2% White, 7.6% Black or African American, 0.2% American Indian and Alaska Native, 2.4% Asian, <0.1% Native Hawaiian and Pacific Islander, 1.7% from some other race, and 5.9% from two or more races. Hispanic or Latino residents of any race comprised 4.4% of the population.

=== American Community Survey estimates ===
Ancestry data, based on American Community Survey estimates, indicated that approximately 24 percent of residents were of German descent, 12.5 percent Polish, 12.3 percent Italian, 10.1 percent Irish, 6.5 percent English, and 6.4 percent identified as having "American" ancestry.

== Metropolitan Statistical Area ==
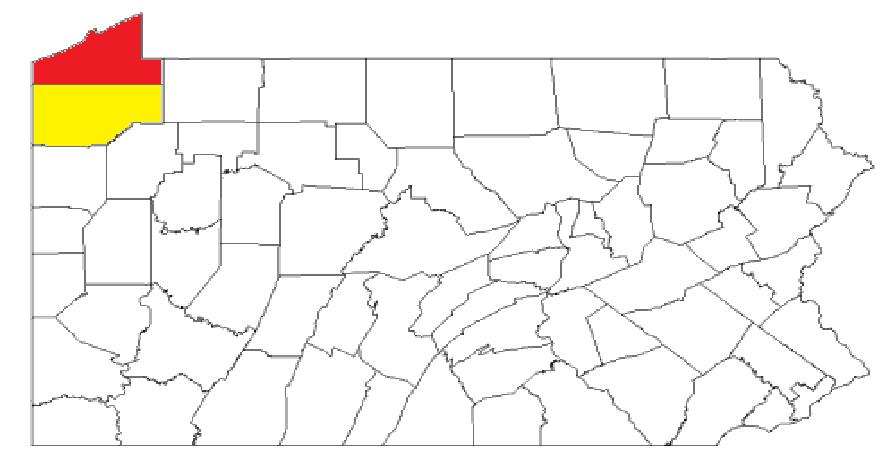
Map of the Erie-Meadville, PA Combined Statistical Area (CSA), composed of: Erie, PA Metropolitan Statistical Area Meadville, PA Micropolitan Statistical Area

The United States Office of Management and Budget has designated Erie County as the Erie, PA Metropolitan Statistical Area (MSA). As of the 2010 U.S. census the metropolitan area ranked 11th-most populous in Pennsylvania and the 164th-most populous in the United States with a population of 280,566.

Erie County is part of the larger Erie-Meadville, PA Combined Statistical Area (CSA), which combines the populations of Erie County as well as Crawford County to the south. The Combined Statistical Area ranked seventh in Pennsylvania and 102nd-most populous in the United States with a population of 369,331.

== Largest populations in Erie County ==
2023 rank	City	Type	2023 estimate	2020 Census	Change	Highest Population (Year)
1	Erie	City	92,957	94,852	−2.00%	138,440 (1960)
2	Millcreek	Township	53,101	54,070	−1.79%	54,256 (2013)
3	Harborcreek	Township	16,580	16,630	−0.30%	17,629 (2014)
4	Fairview	Township	11,270	11,139	+1.18%	11,270 (2023)
5	Summit	Township	7,273	7,339	−0.90%	7,339 (2020)
6	North East	Township	6,439	6,529	−1.38%	7,702 (2000)
7	Corry	City	6,075	6,208	−2.14%	7,911 (1950)
8	Edinboro	Borough	5,821	4,963	+17.29%	7,736 (1990)

== Government and politics ==
Before 1960, Erie County was primarily Republican in presidential elections, only backing Democratic Party candidates in four elections from 1888 to 1956. Since 1960, the county has become primarily Democratic, with only five Republican wins in presidential elections from 1960 to the present. Nevertheless, since the 2016 presidential election, the county has become increasingly competitive, with Donald Trump narrowly winning the county that year, followed by Joe Biden narrowly flipping the county in 2020. Most recently, Trump reclaimed it in 2024. Since 1992, the county has voted for the statewide winner in presidential elections, and has done so in all but one since 1948.

United States presidential election results for Erie County, Pennsylvania
Year	Republican		Democratic		Third party(ies)	
Year	No.	%	No.	%	No.	%
1880	8,752	55.12%	6,471	40.76%	654	4.12%
1884	9,230	54.77%	6,725	39.91%	896	5.32%
1888	9,372	54.23%	7,111	41.15%	798	4.62%
1892	8,918	49.76%	7,589	42.34%	1,416	7.90%
1896	11,819	54.74%	9,210	42.65%	563	2.61%
1900	11,816	58.47%	7,281	36.03%	1,110	5.49%
1904	11,951	62.84%	5,119	26.92%	1,948	10.24%
1908	10,828	55.76%	6,173	31.79%	2,418	12.45%
1912	4,958	26.93%	5,633	30.60%	7,817	42.47%
1916	8,933	43.30%	9,641	46.73%	2,056	9.97%
1920	19,465	63.68%	6,311	20.65%	4,793	15.68%
1924	19,480	61.29%	3,502	11.02%	8,802	27.69%
1928	30,542	60.97%	19,278	38.48%	277	0.55%
1932	18,371	45.43%	19,592	48.44%	2,479	6.13%
1936	25,607	39.18%	33,042	50.56%	6,706	10.26%
1940	36,608	53.28%	31,735	46.18%	371	0.54%
1944	35,247	51.40%	32,912	47.99%	419	0.61%
1948	33,806	53.45%	28,159	44.52%	1,280	2.02%
1952	48,836	56.89%	36,619	42.66%	391	0.46%
1956	54,430	61.46%	33,802	38.17%	323	0.36%
1960	51,525	48.82%	53,723	50.90%	295	0.28%
1964	31,393	29.93%	72,944	69.55%	549	0.52%
1968	43,134	43.20%	51,604	51.68%	5,109	5.12%
1972	61,542	58.22%	42,022	39.75%	2,149	2.03%
1976	49,641	46.20%	55,385	51.55%	2,413	2.25%
1980	48,918	47.42%	45,946	44.54%	8,298	8.04%
1984	55,860	51.12%	52,471	48.02%	935	0.86%
1988	48,306	46.76%	53,913	52.19%	1,081	1.05%
1992	39,283	33.35%	56,381	47.86%	22,140	18.79%
1996	39,884	36.66%	57,508	52.86%	11,399	10.48%
2000	49,027	43.64%	59,399	52.88%	3,909	3.48%
2004	57,372	45.57%	67,921	53.95%	605	0.48%
2008	50,351	39.25%	75,775	59.07%	2,145	1.67%
2012	49,025	41.16%	68,036	57.12%	2,053	1.72%
2016	60,069	48.01%	58,112	46.44%	6,948	5.55%
2020	66,869	48.63%	68,286	49.66%	2,339	1.70%
2024	68,866	49.91%	67,456	48.89%	1,657	1.20%

United States Senate election results for Erie County, Pennsylvania1
Year	Republican		Democratic		Third party(ies)	
Year	No.	%	No.	%	No.	%
1994	46,940	51.47%	42,178	46.25%	2,079	2.28%
2000	58,302	54.48%	46,726	43.66%	1,983	1.85%
2006	34,757	40.60%	50,857	59.40%	0	0.00%
2012	45,888	41.26%	62,602	56.29%	2,721	2.45%
2018	40,348	39.99%	58,906	58.39%	1,635	1.62%
2024	65,603	47.94%	67,868	49.60%	3,371	2.46%

United States Senate election results for Erie County, Pennsylvania3
Year	Republican		Democratic		Third party(ies)	
Year	No.	%	No.	%	No.	%
1992	51,555	45.84%	54,095	48.10%	6,824	6.07%
1998	43,175	59.84%	25,616	35.50%	3,358	4.65%
2004	69,978	60.25%	42,156	36.29%	4,016	3.46%
2010	37,698	45.01%	46,054	54.99%	0	0.00%
2016	60,948	49.66%	56,846	46.32%	4,930	4.02%
2022	46,507	43.98%	56,404	53.35%	2,823	2.67%

Pennsylvania Gubernatorial election results for Erie County
Year	Republican		Democratic		Third party(ies)	
Year	No.	%	No.	%	No.	%
1970	32,046	40.26%	45,977	57.76%	1,580	1.98%
1974	38,833	52.09%	34,576	46.38%	1,138	1.53%
1978	41,670	52.91%	35,899	45.58%	1,184	1.50%
1982	45,830	51.74%	41,439	46.78%	1,311	1.48%
1986	37,583	50.32%	35,727	47.83%	1,385	1.85%
1990	20,424	28.14%	52,168	71.86%	0	0.00%
1994	65,181	67.34%	21,422	22.13%	10,189	10.53%
1998	49,027	63.68%	16,783	21.80%	11,174	14.51%
2002	43,095	54.85%	32,774	41.72%	2,694	3.43%
2006	36,059	41.88%	50,042	58.12%	0	0.00%
2010	42,752	50.10%	42,581	49.90%	0	0.00%
2014	30,389	41.91%	42,115	58.09%	0	0.00%
2018	39,387	38.72%	60,790	59.77%	1,534	1.51%
2022	40,433	38.29%	63,081	59.74%	2,085	1.97%

The county seat of government is in Erie. Erie County operates under a home-rule charter and elects a county executive to manage its government. The current County Executive is Christina Vogel. Vogel assumed the office on January 5, 2026, following the defeat of Brenton Davis. The remaining elected officials of the executive branch are the Erie County Controller, Erie County Coroner, Erie County District Attorney, Erie County Sheriff, and Erie County Clerk of Records. see latest list

Erie County Executives
Name	Party	Term start	Term end
Russell Robison	Republican	1978	1982
Judith M. Lynch	Democratic	1982	2002
Richard Schenker	Republican	2002	2006
Mark A. DiVecchio	Democratic	2006	2010
Barry Grossman	Democratic	2010	2014
Kathleen Dahlkemper	Democratic	2014	2022
Brenton Davis	Republican	2022	2026
Christina Vogel	Democratic	2026	Incumbent

=== Row officers ===
Office	Holder	Party
County Executive	Christina Vogel	Democrat
Clerk of Records	Aubrea Hagerty-Haynes	Democratic
Controller	Kyle Foust	Democratic
Coroner	Lyell Cook	Republican
District Attorney	Elizabeth Hirz	Republican
Sheriff	Chris Campanelli	Democratic

=== Judiciary ===
Nine judges serve on the Erie County Court of Common Pleas, and fifteen magisterial district judges preside over the county's district courts. A district court administrator, along with a deputy and an assistant court administrator, manages court operations. Erie County maintains its courthouse near Perry Square in downtown Erie, operates a county prison, and oversees a combined 911/Emergency Management Agency through the Erie County Department of Public Safety in Summit Township.

== Politics ==
As of September 15, 2026, there are 174,717 registered voters in Erie County.

Voter Registration Statistics in Erie County, Pennsylvania (as of Feb 9, 2026)
Party-	Registered Voters
Democratic	76,410
Republican	70,769
Independent / No Affiliation	20,892

The county is considered a bellwether politically.

=== State Senate ===
Senator	Party	District
Dan Laughlin	Republican	Pennsylvania's 49th Senatorial District
Scott Hutchinson	Republican	Pennsylvania's 21st Senatorial District

=== State House of Representatives ===
Representative	Party	District
Patrick J. Harkins	Democratic	Pennsylvania's 1st Representative District
Robert Merski	Democratic	Pennsylvania's 2nd Representative District
Ryan Bizzarro	Democratic	Pennsylvania's 3rd Representative District
Jake Banta	Republican	Pennsylvania's 4th Representative District
Brad Roae	Republican	Pennsylvania's 6th Representative District

=== United States Senate ===
Senator	Party
John Fetterman	Democratic
Dave McCormick	Republican

=== United States House of Representatives ===
Representative	Party	District
Mike Kelly	Republican	Pennsylvania's 16th congressional district

== Education ==
=== Public school districts ===
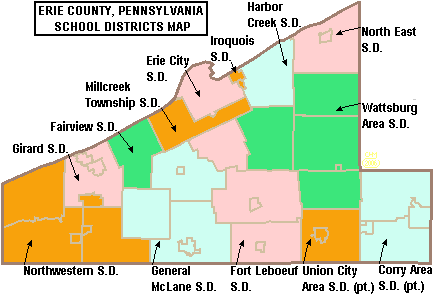
Map of Erie County, Pennsylvania School Districts

School districts include:

- Corry Area School District
- Erie City School District
- Fairview School District
- Fort LeBoeuf School District
- General McLane School District
- Girard School District
- Harbor Creek School District
- Iroquois School District
- Millcreek Township School District
- North East School District
- Northwestern School District
- Union City Area School District
- Wattsburg Area School District

=== Approved private schools ===
- Barber National Institute, Erie, Pennsylvania

=== Community College ===
After years of advocacy on the issue, the Erie County Council approved sponsorship of the Erie County Community College on June 28, 2017. Council Chairman Jay Breneman and colleagues Andre Horton, Kathy Fatica, and Fiore Leone voted in favor of sponsoring the community college, which County Executive Kathy Dahlkemper later signed. The County Executive's administration took the lead in presenting the proposal to the Pennsylvania State Board of Education for approval, supported by a cross-section of business, civic, labor, and community leaders.

== Recreation ==
There are two Pennsylvania state parks in Erie County, and both are on the shores of Lake Erie.

- Erie Bluffs State Park – one of Pennsylvania's newest state parks
- Presque Isle State Park – one of Pennsylvania's oldest state parks and the most-visited state park in Pennsylvania.

=== Recreation ===
- Splash Lagoon Indoor Waterpark
- Millcreek Mall
- Presque Isle Downs and Casino
- Presque Isle State Park
- Erie Zoo
- Tom Ridge Environmental Center
- Erie Maritime Museum
- Warner Theatre
- Erie Art Museum
- Waldameer & Water World
- Erie County Public Library

=== Annual events ===
- Roar on the Shore

=== Libraries ===
The Erie County library system operates the foremost public library in Erie, comprising five branches and a bookmobile. In 1996, the county opened the Raymond M. Blasco, M. D. Memorial Library, named for its benefactor. Now called the Main Library or the Erie County Public Library, it ranks as the third-largest library in Pennsylvania. The library relocated from downtown Erie to the bayfront as part of a redevelopment initiative that also introduced the Erie Maritime Museum, Bayfront Convention Center, and Bicentennial Tower on Dobbins Landing. The Main Library features waterfront views of Presque Isle Bay and frequently overlooks the historic U.S. Brig Niagara docked nearby. This relocation, completed approximately 25 years ago, helped revitalize Erie's waterfront, which had remained underdeveloped before the project.

The second floor of the Main Library is home to an art collection, containing historic pieces like Summer Afternoon, Isle of Shoals by Frederick Childe Hassam. The display also features several local artists. The library works with the International Institute of Erie (IIE) to offer tours of the library, a collection of foreign-language books, and other practical information about immigration processes. The library also provides a heritage room where one can conduct genealogy research concerning their ancestors who resided in Erie County or Northwest Pennsylvania.

The four remaining libraries within the Erie County library system are the Edinboro Branch Library, Iroquois Avenue Branch Library, Lincoln Community Center Branch Library, and Millcreek Branch Library. The other public libraries of Erie County include the Albion Area Public Library, Corry Public Library, McCord Memorial Library, Rice Avenue Public Library, Union City Public Library, and Waterford Public Library.

== Communities ==
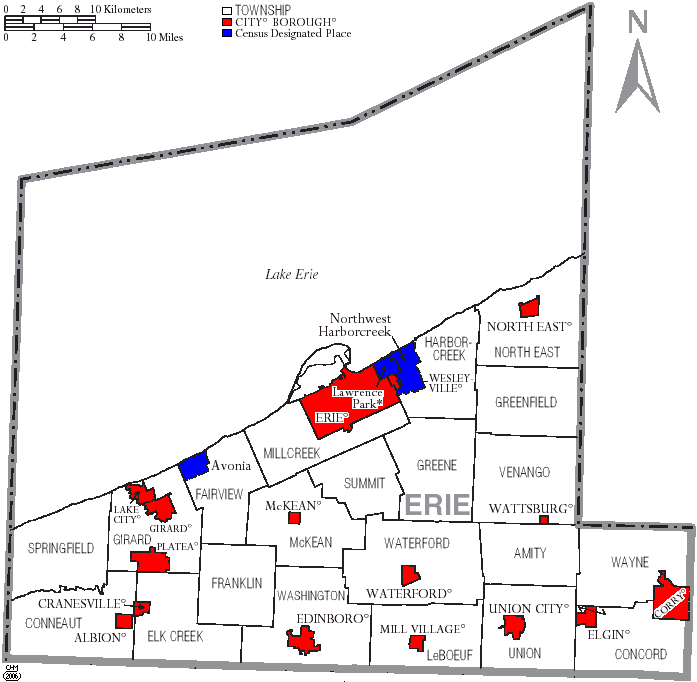
Map of Erie County, Pennsylvania, with Municipal Labels showing Cities and Boroughs (red), Townships (white), and Census-designated places (blue).

Under Pennsylvania law, there are four types of incorporated municipalities: cities, boroughs, townships, and, in at most two cases, towns. There are 38 incorporated municipalities in Erie County, including 2 cities, 14 boroughs, and 22 townships. Erie County includes the following cities, boroughs, and townships:

=== Cities ===
- Corry
- Erie (county seat)

=== Boroughs ===
- Albion
- Cranesville
- Edinboro
- Elgin
- Girard
- Lake City
- McKean
- Mill Village
- North East
- Platea
- Union City
- Waterford
- Wattsburg
- Wesleyville

=== Townships ===
- Amity Township
- Concord Township
- Conneaut Township
- Elk Creek Township
- Fairview Township
- Franklin Township
- Girard Township
- Greene Township
- Greenfield Township
- Harborcreek Township
- Lawrence Park Township
- LeBoeuf Township
- McKean Township
- Millcreek Township
- North East Township
- Springfield Township
- Summit Township
- Union Township
- Venango Township
- Washington Township
- Waterford Township
- Wayne Township

=== Census-designated places ===
Census-designated places are geographical areas designated by the U.S. Census Bureau for the purposes of compiling demographic data. They are not actual jurisdictions under Pennsylvania law. Other unincorporated communities, such as villages, may also be listed here.

- Avonia
- Fairview
- Lawrence Park
- Northwest Harborcreek
- Penn State Erie (Behrend)

=== Population ranking ===
The 2010 United States census ranked the population of the following municipalities in Erie County as follows.

† county seat

Rank	City/Town/etc.	Municipal type	Population (2010 Census)
1	† Erie	City	101,786
2	Northwest Harborcreek	CDP	8,949
3	Corry	City	6,605
4	Edinboro	Borough	6,438
5	North East	Borough	4,294
6	Lawrence Park	CDP	3,982
7	Wesleyville	Borough	3,341
8	Union City	Borough	3,320
9	Girard	Borough	3,104
10	Lake City	Borough	3,031
11	Fairview	CDP	2,348
12	Penn State Erie (Behrend)	CDP	1,629
13	Waterford	Borough	1,517
14	Albion	Borough	1,516
15	Avonia	CDP	1,205
16	Cranesville	Borough	638
17	Platea	Borough	430
18	Mill Village	Borough	412
19	Wattsburg	Borough	403
20	McKean	Borough	388
21	Elgin	Borough	218

== See also ==
- National Register of Historic Places listings in Erie County, Pennsylvania
