= Robert Merski =

American politician (born 1975)

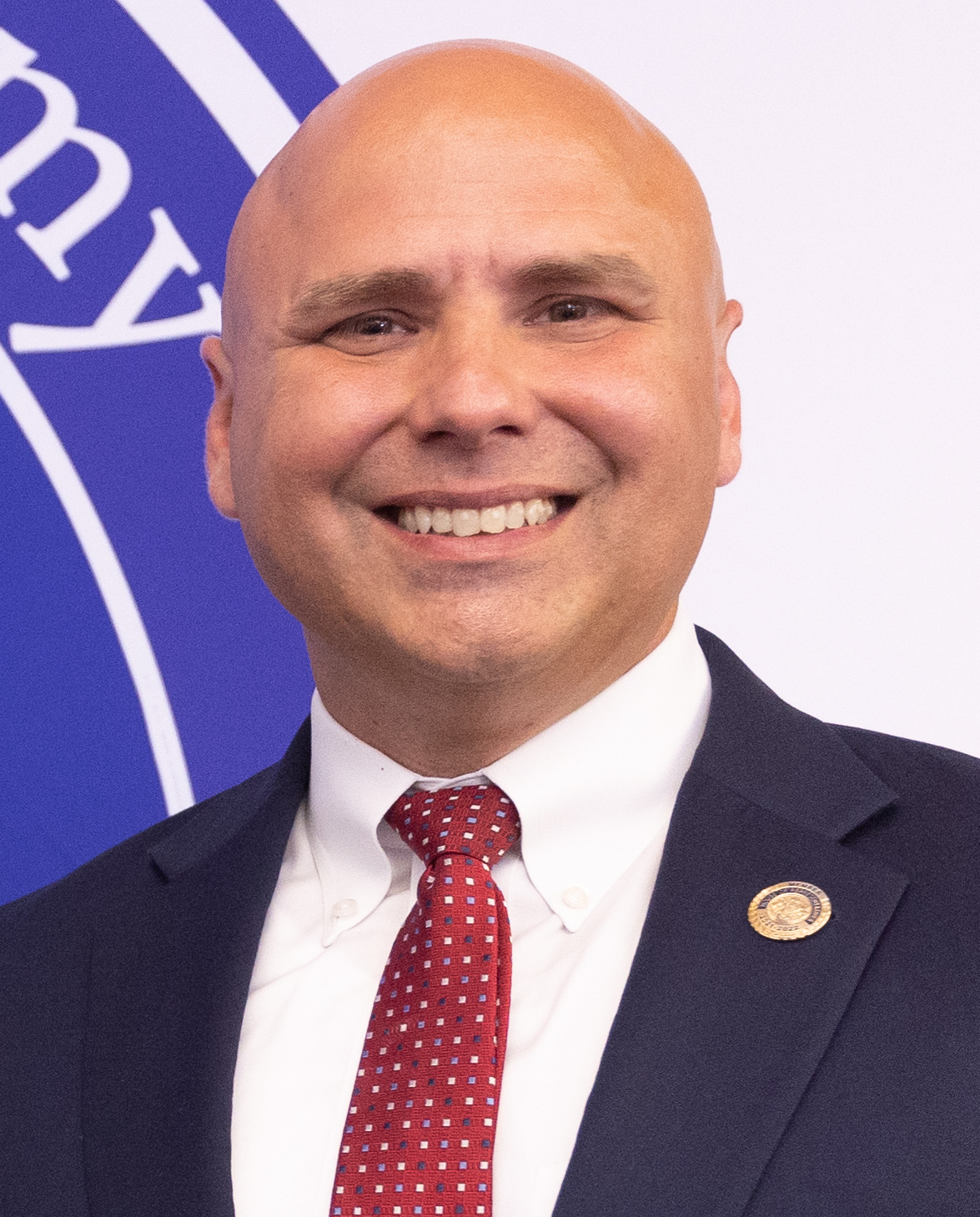

Member of the Pennsylvania House of Representatives from the 2nd district
- Incumbent
- Assumed office January 1, 2019
- Preceded by: Florindo Fabrizio

Personal details
- Born: May 14, 1975 (age 51) Erie, Pennsylvania, U.S.
- Party: Democratic
- Education: Mercyhurst University; Wilkes University
- Profession: Educator

Robert Merski (born May 14, 1975) is a Democratic member of the Pennsylvania House of Representatives, representing the 2nd district.

== Personal ==
Merski was born and grew up in Erie, Pennsylvania. He attended Cathedral Preparatory School and graduated from Mercyhurst University with a degree in education. He later received a master's degree from Wilkes University and worked as a social studies teacher for the Erie City School District. Merski's father, Bob Merski, previously served as the Sheriff of Erie County.

== Political career ==
Merski previously served on the Erie City Council for seven years. In 2018, he took a leave of absence from with the Erie City School District to run for the 2nd District seat after the incumbent, Florindo Fabrizio, announced he would not be running for reelection due to a terminal cancer diagnosis. Endorsed by Fabrizio before his death, Merski won the Democratic primary over two other candidates by securing 47% of the vote and went on to beat Republican Tim Kuzma in the general election after receiving 65% of the vote.

== Committee assignments ==
- Game & Fisheries
- Gaming Oversight
- Insurance
- Urban Affairs
