= Lawrence Park Township, Pennsylvania =

Township in Pennsylvania, US

Lawrence Park Township
- 1st Class Township
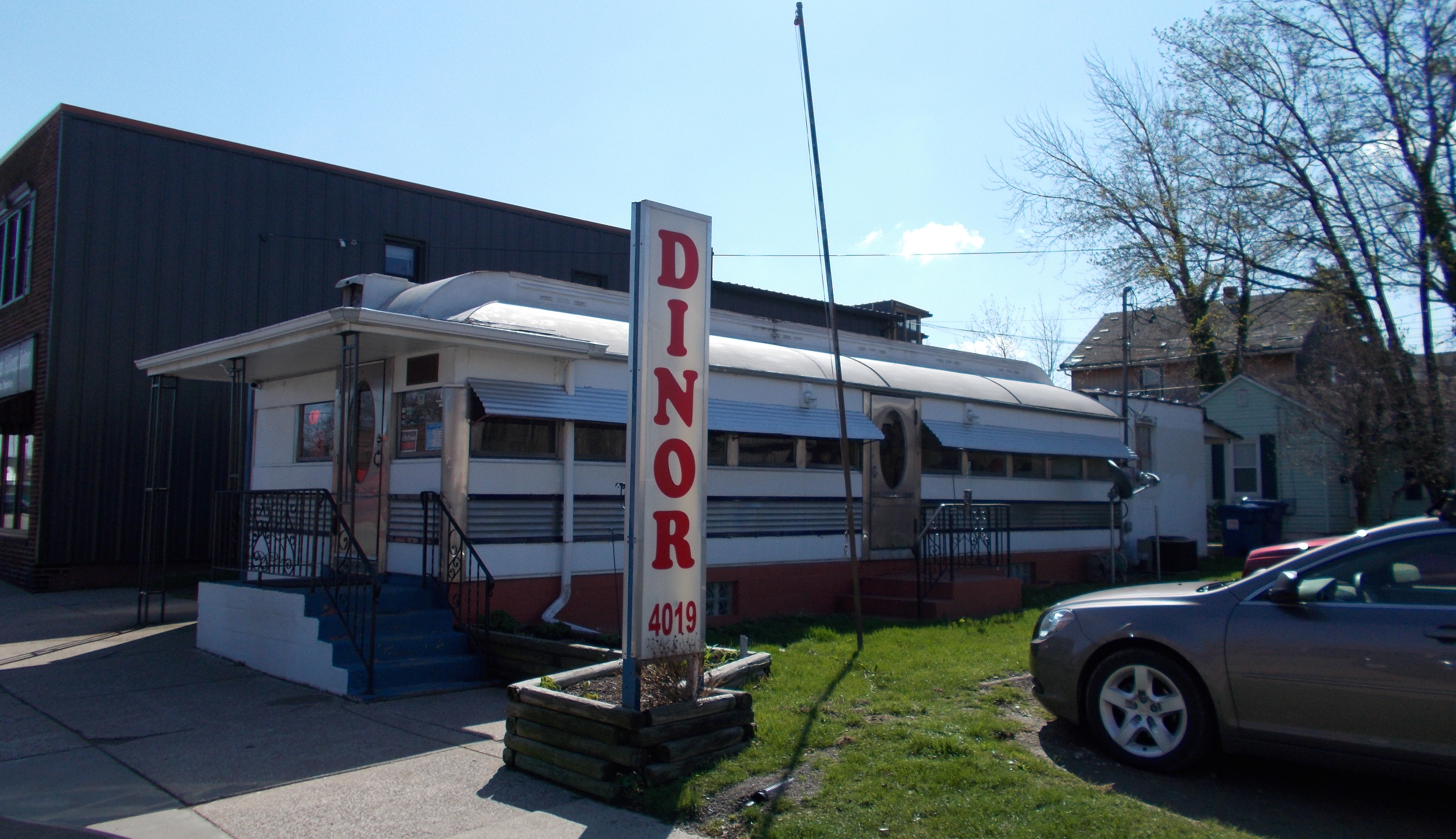
- Lawrence Park Dinor
- Etymology: James Lawrence
- Location in Erie County and the U.S. state of Pennsylvania
- Coordinates: 42°9′5″N 80°1′11″W
- Country: United States
- State: Pennsylvania
- County: Erie
- Established: 1910

Area
  - Total: 1.84 sq mi (4.76 km^{2})
  - Land: 1.84 sq mi (4.76 km^{2})
  - Water: 0 sq mi (0.00 km^{2})

Population (2020)
  - Total: 3,824 ▼
  - Estimate (2024): 3,732
  - Density: 2,079.6/sq mi (802.93/km^{2})
- Time zone: UTC-5 (EST)
  - Summer (DST): UTC-4 (EDT)
- Area code: 814
- FIPS code: 42-049-41984
- Website: www.lawrenceparktwp.org

Lawrence Park Township is the only first class township in Erie County, Pennsylvania, United States. The population was 3,824 at the 2020 census, down from 4,048 at the 2000 census. The 2010 census counted a population of 3,982, for a decline of 1.6% during the decade. The entire township is also listed as a census-designated place.

The township was established in 1910 as a company town for General Electric. It was named after USS Lawrence, flagship of Oliver Hazard Perry, and her namesake, James Lawrence, commander of USS Chesapeake during the War of 1812.

== History ==
The Lawrence Park Dinor was listed on the National Register of Historic Places in 2004.

== Geography ==
Lawrence Park Township is located at 42°9′5″N 80°1′11″W (42.151257, -80.019648). It is bordered to the west by the city of Erie, to the south by Erie and the borough of Wesleyville, to the east by Harborcreek Township, and to the north by Lake Erie.

According to the United States Census Bureau, the township has a total area of 1.9 square miles (4.8 km^{2}), all of it land.

== Demographics ==
Historical population
Census	Pop.	Note	%±
1990	4,310		—
2000	4,048		−6.1%
2010	3,982		−1.6%
2020	3,824		−4.0%
2024 (est.)	3,732	▼	−2.4%
U.S. Decennial Census

As of the census of 2000, there were 4,048 people, 1,547 households, and 1,124 families residing in the township. The population density was 2,176.8 inhabitants per square mile (840.5/km^{2}). There were 1,626 housing units at an average density of 874.4 per square mile (337.6/km^{2}). The racial makeup of the township was 98.67% White, 0.52% African American, 0.02% Native American, 0.22% Asian, 0.17% from other races, and 0.40% from two or more races. Hispanic or Latino of any race were 0.82% of the population.

There were 1,547 households, out of which 33.8% had children under the age of 18 living with them, 54.8% were married couples living together, 14.1% had a female householder with no husband present, and 27.3% were non-families. 23.3% of all households were made up of individuals, and 11.9% had someone living alone who was 65 years of age or older. The average household size was 2.54 and the average family size was 3.00.

In the township the population was spread out, with 25.2% under the age of 18, 6.9% from 18 to 24, 26.9% from 25 to 44, 21.7% from 45 to 64, and 19.3% who were 65 years of age or older. The median age was 39 years. For every 100 females, there were 86.4 males. For every 100 females age 18 and over, there were 84.2 males.

The median income for a household in the township was $40,625, and the median income for a family was $46,944. Males had a median income of $35,964 versus $25,613 for females. The per capita income for the township was $19,131. About 4.3% of families and 6.5% of the population were below the poverty line, including 7.8% of those under age 18 and 6.1% of those age 65 or over.
