= Main Library (Erie, Pennsylvania) =

- 42.12913°N 80.08367°W
- Location: 27 South Park Row; Erie, Pennsylvania, United States
- Type: Public
- Established: 1897
- Dissolved: 1996
- Branch of: Erie City and County Library

- Main Library
- U.S. National Register of Historic Places
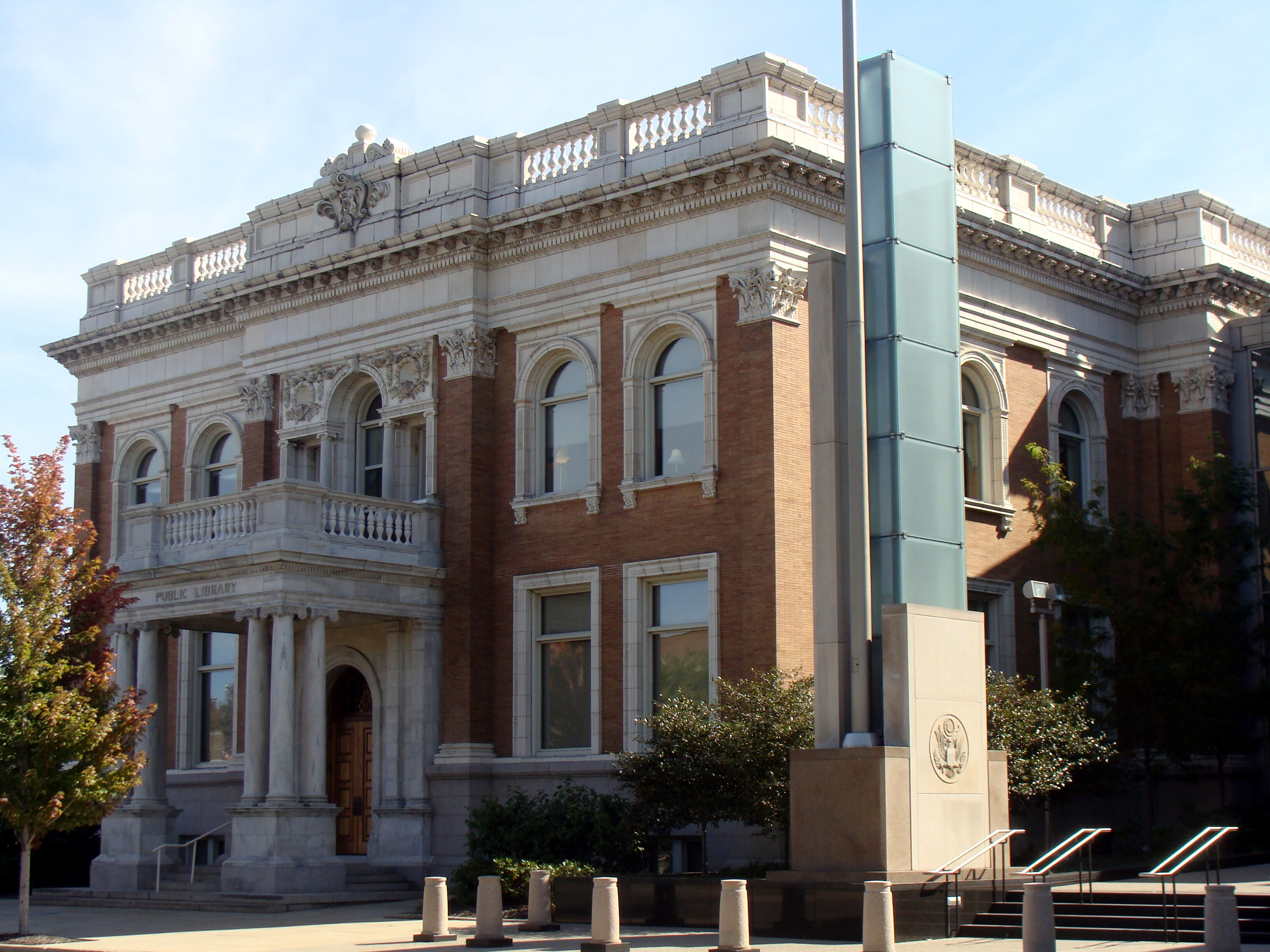
- Location: 27 South Park Row; Erie, Pennsylvania, U.S.
- Built: 1897
- Architect: Alden & Harlow
- Architectural style: Beaux-Arts, Second Renaissance
- NRHP reference No.: 79002225
- Added to NRHP: April 26, 1979

The Main Library, also known as the Erie Public Library, combines elements of the Beaux Arts Classicism and Second Renaissance Revival styles of architecture. Both were commonly used at the end of the nineteenth century to convey the importance of public buildings. The building features arched openings, a prominent cornice, swag and garland decorations, and a roofline balustrade. It is clad in Pompeian red brick. The original facade is dominated by a marble portico, which was removed and stored by previous owners. It was reassembled and conserved as part of the renovation, recapturing the library's original grandeur.

The library rotunda is one of the most significant interior spaces in Erie and was meticulously restored as part of the renovation. Mahogany paneling and marble floors serve as a backdrop for a decorative paint scheme. Spectacular allegorical murals on either side of the coffered skylight reference literature, art, science, and poetry. They were completed by Elmer Ellsworth Garnsey, who also completed murals in the New York Stock Exchange Building and the Library of Congress.

== Construction ==
The building is a three-story rectangular structure with a partially underground basement. The basement is clad in granite that rises to the level of the belt course of the first-floor window sills. Above that, the first and second floors are clad with light-brown Pompeian brick and articulated with matching brick Corinthian pilasters containing terra cotta capitals. Windows are rectangular fixed light units on the first floor, and round-headed fixed light units on the second floor. The window frames are terra cotta and provide visual contrast with the brick on the facades. Above the second floor is the terra cotta Ionic order entablature, which contains an architrave, a floriated, bracketed frieze set on top of egg-and-dart moldings, and a decorative cornice embellished with lions' heads. Above the entablature is a terra-cotta balustrade, set on a terra-cotta plinth.

The massing of the building is rectangular, roughly 144 by 275 feet (44 by 84 m), oriented so that the short dimension faces South Park Row, to the north. The front (north) elevation features a slightly projecting center bay at the entrance. Until recently (1991–92), a large projecting Ionic Order covered porch highlighted the main public entrance to the building; it was recently found to be structurally unsound, dismantled, and stored on site, pending funding for its eventual restoration. Directly above the main entrance is a terra cotta Palladian window, with recessed circular niches and festooned garlands across the head. The east and west sides of the building feature projecting central sections, each three bays in width. On the east side, the secondary entrance to the building is set in a rusticated granite entrance way with an arched door. The arched window on the second floor, directly above, is also flanked by coffered niches, set in the brick. On the west side, the large window at the stair landing has been infilled with glass block (presumably as a retrofit at some point, in an attempt to shield the building's occupants from the late afternoon sun glare).

=== Interior ===
On the interior of the building, the primary public space is the Main Hall, positioned directly in the center, and designed so that each central room is directly connected to the others. The Main Hall is open on the second floor level (which contains a balcony that connects all the public spaces on the second floor) and is capped with a square laylight above. On the west side, a large wooden stair with a landing provides the primary means of getting between floors.

Flanking the Main Hall, in the northwest and northeast corners of the first floor (respectively) are the Fiction Room and Reference Room. These rooms are largely unaltered and contain plastered ceilings and walls, with decorative coffered areas in the ceilings to break up the mass and perceived size of the rooms. These rooms also feature original decorative wood bookshelves, set on wooden bases and capped with decorative wood cornice trim. Directly to the south of the Reference Room is the Small Reference Room, which contains a mezzanine and built-in wood shelves on both levels. To the south of the Main Hall is the Nonfiction Room, which was modified in the 1920s and contains metal shelves and a combination metal shelving/mezzanine structure, with integrated partitions for offices.

The primary room on the second floor is the Plavcan Gallery, located in the center of the north side, connecting with the upper part of the Main Hall. The Plavcan Gallery is a spacious room featuring a vaulted, coffered ceiling with laylights set within the coffers. On the south side of the second floor, two of the offices contain laylights in the ceiling. The basement includes Children's Library spaces and numerous stack areas; most of the original finishes have been replaced with modern, sound-absorbing, light materials.
