= Harborcreek Township, Pennsylvania =

Township in Pennsylvania, US

Harborcreek Township
- Township
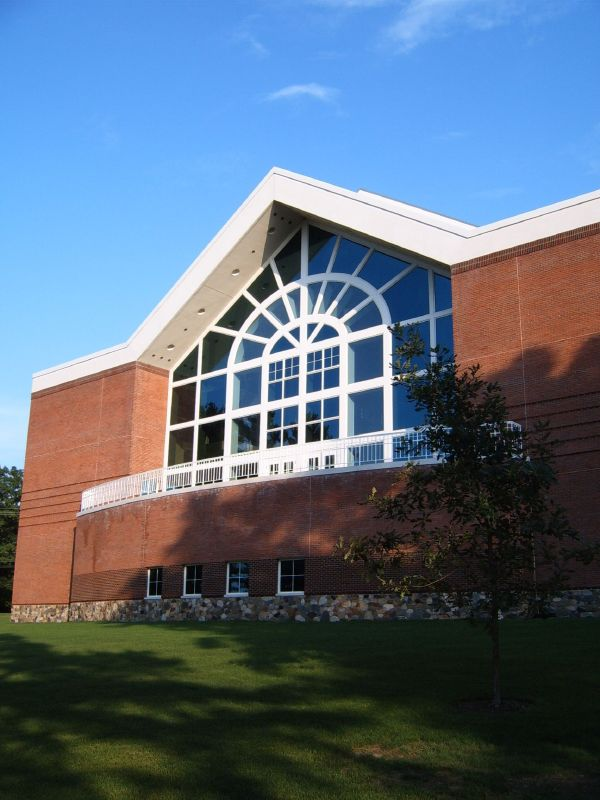
- John M. Lilley Library, Penn State Behrend

- Flag Logo
- Motto: "A Progressive Community"
- Location in Erie County and the U.S. state of Pennsylvania
- Coordinates: 42°9′N 79°57′W
- Country: United States
- State: Pennsylvania
- County: Erie
- Founded: 1803

Area
  - Total: 34.11 sq mi (88.35 km^{2})
  - Land: 34.09 sq mi (88.29 km^{2})
  - Water: 0.023 sq mi (0.06 km^{2})
- Highest elevation (south border east of Lunger Road): 1,400 ft (430 m)
- Lowest elevation (Lake Erie): 572 ft (174 m)

Population (2020)
  - Total: 16,633 ▼
  - Estimate (2024): 16,695
  - Density: 514/sq mi (198.4/km^{2})
- Time zone: UTC-4 (EST)
  - Summer (DST): UTC-5 (EDT)
- ZIP codes: 16421, 16510, 16511
- Area code: 814
- FIPS code: 42-049-32520
- Website: www.harborcreektownship.org

Harborcreek Township is a township in Erie County, Pennsylvania, United States. The population was 16,633 at the 2020 census, down from 17,234 at the 2010 census, up from 15,178 in 2000. It is part of the Erie Metropolitan Statistical Area.

== Geography ==
Harborcreek Township is in northeastern Erie County, bordered to the north by Lake Erie, to the west by Lawrence Park Township, the borough of Wesleyville, the city of Erie, and Millcreek Township, to the south by Greene Township, and to the east by Greenfield Township and North East Township. The unincorporated community of Harborcreek is north of the township center, and the communities of Fairfield and Brookside, together comprising the Northwest Harborcreek census-designated place, are on the western side of the township. Penn State Behrend is in the southwestern part of the township.

According to the United States Census Bureau, the township has a total area of 34.11 square miles (88.35 km^{2}), of which 0.02 square miles (0.06 km^{2}), or 0.07%, is water.

== Demographics ==
Historical population
Census	Pop.	Note	%±
1980	14,644		—
1990	15,108		3.2%
2000	16,267		7.7%
2010	17,234		5.9%
2020	16,633		−3.5%
2024 (est.)	16,695		0.4%
U.S. Decennial Census

=== 2010 census ===
As of the census of 2010, there were 17,234 people, 6,155 households, and 4,372 families living in the township. The population density was 503.9 inhabitants per square mile (194.6/km^{2}). There were 6,461 housing units at an average density of 188.9 per square mile (72.9/km^{2}). The racial makeup of the township was 96.7% White, 1.4% African American, 0.1% Native American, 0.8% Asian, 0.2% from other races, and 0.8% from two or more races. Hispanic or Latino of any race were 1% of the population.

There were 6,155 households, 28.3% had children under the age of 18 living with them, 59.1% were married couples living together, 7.7% had a female householder with no husband present, and 29% were non-families. 24.2% of households were made up of individuals, and 12% were one person aged 65 or older. The average household size was 2.49 and the average family size was 2.96.

The age distribution was 26.7% under the age of 20, 8.5% from 20 to 24, 19% from 25 to 44, 29.2% from 45 to 64, and 16.6% 65 or older. The median age was 41.5 years.

The median household income was $61,800 and the median family income was $72,445. Males had a median income of $53,302 versus $34,747 for females. The per capita income for the township was $24,525. About 3.9% of families and 9.1% of the population were below the poverty line, including 8.5% of those under age 18 and 6.5% of those age 65 or over.

=== 2000 census ===
At the 2000 census there were 15,178 people, 5,398 households, and 4,021 families living in the township. The population density was 443.2 inhabitants per square mile (171.1/km^{2}). There were 5,645 housing units at an average density of 164.8 per square mile (63.6/km^{2}). The racial makeup of the township was 97.52% White, 1.21% African American, 0.08% Native American, 0.51% Asian, 0.01% Pacific Islander, 0.17% from other races, and 0.49% from two or more races. Hispanic or Latino of any race were 0.57%.

There were 5,398 households, 31.6% had children under the age of 18 living with them, 63.6% were married couples living together, 7.4% had a female householder with no husband present, and 25.5% were non-families. 21.9% of households were made up of individuals, and 11.5% were one person aged 65 or older. The average household size was 2.64 and the average family size was 3.08.

The age distribution was 23.6% under the age of 18, 10.0% from 18 to 24, 24.4% from 25 to 44, 25.6% from 45 to 64, and 16.4% 65 or older. The median age was 40 years. For every 100 females there were 97.8 males. For every 100 females age 18 and over, there were 93.4 males.

The median household income was $47,294 and the median family income was $54,291. Males had a median income of $39,912 versus $26,698 for females. The per capita income for the township was $20,025. About 3.0% of families and 5.5% of the population were below the poverty line, including 4.7% of those under age 18 and 8.2% of those age 65 or over.
