= Wesleyville, Pennsylvania =

Borough in Pennsylvania, US

- Borough
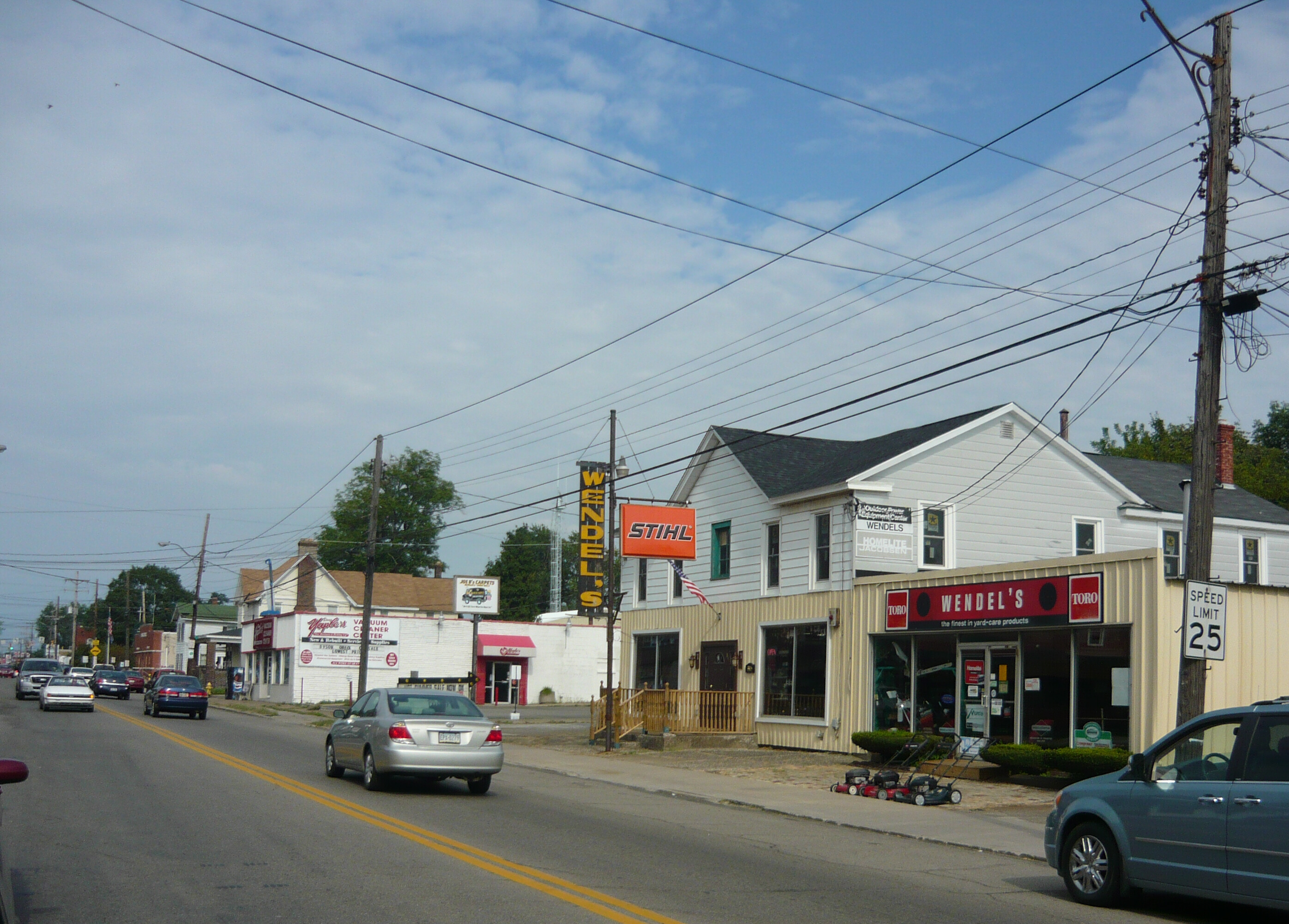
- Buffalo Road (US 20) through Wesleyville

- Location in Erie County and the U.S. state of Pennsylvania.
- Coordinates: 42°8′13″N 80°0′45″W
- Country: United States
- State: Pennsylvania
- County: Erie

Area
  - Total: 0.53 sq mi (1.37 km^{2})
  - Land: 0.53 sq mi (1.37 km^{2})
  - Water: 0 sq mi (0.00 km^{2})
- Elevation: 723 ft (220 m)

Population (2020)
  - Total: 3,229 ▼
  - Estimate (2021): 3,196
  - Density: 5,882.6/sq mi (2,271.27/km^{2})
- Time zone: UTC-4 (EST)
  - Summer (DST): UTC-5 (EDT)
- ZIP code: 16510
- Area code: 814
- FIPS code: 42-82344
- Website: wesleyville.gov

Wesleyville is a borough in Erie County, Pennsylvania, United States. The population was 3,229 at the 2020 census, down from 3,341 in 2010. It is part of the Erie Metropolitan Statistical Area.

== Geography ==
Wesleyville is bordered to the west by the city of Erie, to the north by Lawrence Park Township, and to the east and south by Harborcreek Township.

According to the United States Census Bureau, the borough has a total area of 0.53 square miles (1.37 km^{2}), all land. Fourmile Creek, a tributary of Lake Erie, forms the eastern border of the borough.

== Demographics ==
Historical population
Census	Pop.	Note	%±
1920	1,457		—
1930	2,854		95.9%
1940	2,918		2.2%
1950	3,411		16.9%
1960	3,534		3.6%
1970	3,920		10.9%
1980	3,998		2.0%
1990	3,655		−8.6%
2000	3,617		−1.0%
2010	3,341		−7.6%
2020	3,222		−3.6%
2021 (est.)	3,196	▼	−0.8%

=== 2020 census ===
As of the 2020 census, Wesleyville had a population of 3,222. The median age was 37.9 years. 23.3% of residents were under the age of 18 and 15.6% of residents were 65 years of age or older. For every 100 females there were 99.6 males, and for every 100 females age 18 and over there were 97.1 males age 18 and over.

100.0% of residents lived in urban areas, while 0.0% lived in rural areas.

There were 1,379 households in Wesleyville, of which 30.4% had children under the age of 18 living in them. Of all households, 34.0% were married-couple households, 24.1% were households with a male householder and no spouse or partner present, and 31.0% were households with a female householder and no spouse or partner present. About 31.3% of all households were made up of individuals and 14.0% had someone living alone who was 65 years of age or older.

There were 1,489 housing units, of which 7.4% were vacant. The homeowner vacancy rate was 1.8% and the rental vacancy rate was 6.9%.

Racial composition as of the 2020 census
Race	Number	Percent
White	2,834	88.0%
Black or African American	66	2.0%
American Indian and Alaska Native	10	0.3%
Asian	42	1.3%
Native Hawaiian and Other Pacific Islander	4	0.1%
Some other race	57	1.8%
Two or more races	209	6.5%
Hispanic or Latino (of any race)	175	5.4%

=== 2000 census ===
As of the census of 2000, there were 3,617 people, 1,441 households, and 938 families residing in the borough. The population density was 6,765.4 inhabitants per square mile (2,612.1/km^{2}). There were 1,512 housing units at an average density of 2,828.1 per square mile (1,091.9/km^{2}). The racial makeup of the borough was 96.71% White, 1.08% African American, 0.28% Native American, 0.22% Asian, 0.03% Pacific Islander, 0.50% from other races, and 1.19% from two or more races. Hispanic or Latino of any race were 1.69% of the population.

There were 1,441 households, out of which 31.4% had children under the age of 18 living with them, 48.3% were married couples living together, 12.1% had a female householder with no husband present, and 34.9% were non-families. 27.2% of all households were made up of individuals, and 9.6% had someone living alone who was 65 years of age or older. The average household size was 2.51 and the average family size was 3.04.

In the borough the population was spread out, with 24.3% under the age of 18, 13.5% from 18 to 24, 28.2% from 25 to 44, 21.1% from 45 to 64, and 12.9% who were 65 years of age or older. The median age was 34 years. For every 100 females there were 99.6 males. For every 100 females age 18 and over, there were 97.8 males.

The median income for a household in the borough was $33,144, and the median income for a family was $42,694. Males had a median income of $32,000 versus $23,971 for females. The per capita income for the borough was $15,644. About 7.3% of families and 11.8% of the population were below the poverty line, including 12.3% of those under age 18 and 12.7% of those age 65 or over.
