= Brian Stablein =

American football player (born 1970)

No. 86, 83
- Position: Wide receiver

Personal information
- Born: April 14, 1970 (age 56); Erie, Pennsylvania, U.S.
- Listed height: 6 ft 1 in (1.85 m)
- Listed weight: 193 lb (88 kg)

Career information
- High school: McDowell (Millcreek Township, Pennsylvania)
- College: Ohio State
- NFL draft: 1993: 8th round, 210th overall pick

Career history
- Denver Broncos (1993)*; Cincinnati Bengals (1993)*; Indianapolis Colts (1993–1997); New England Patriots (1998)*; Detroit Lions (1998–2000)
- * Offseason or practice squad member only

Career NFL statistics
- Receptions: 77
- Receiving yards: 792
- Receiving touchdowns: 3
- Stats at Pro Football Reference

Brian Patrick Stablein (born April 14, 1970) is an American former professional football player who was a wide receiver in the National Football League (NFL). He played college football for the Ohio State Buckeyes and was selected by the Denver Broncos in the eighth round of the 1993 NFL draft.

== Early life ==
Stablein played high school football at McDowell High School in Erie, Pennsylvania. He was a walk-on to the Ohio State Buckeyes football team in 1988. He earned a scholarship in 1990 with the Ohio State Buckeyes.

== Professional career ==
=== Denver Broncos ===
Stablein was selected by the Denver Broncos in the eighth round of the 1993 NFL draft with the 210th overall pick. On August 22, 1993, he was waived along with 11 other players.

=== Cincinnati Bengals ===
On August 25, 1993, he was claimed off of waivers by the Cincinnati Bengals. He was waived by the Bengals on August 31, 1993.

=== Indianapolis Colts ===
From 1994 to 1997, Stablein played four seasons with the Indianapolis Colts, where he caught 51 passes for 540 yards and caught 2 touchdown passes.

=== New England Patriots ===
On March 19, 1998, he signed a three-year contract with the New England Patriots, and was projected to replace the departed Dave Meggett on returns. In 5 exhibition games with the team, he caught two passes for 19 yards and fair caught his only 2 punt return attempts. He was waived on August 31, 1998.

=== Detroit Lions ===
On September 1, 1998, he signed with the Detroit Lions, where he played from 1998 to 2000, catching 26 passes for 252 yards and one touchdown.
