= Erie International Airport =

Airport in Erie County, Pennsylvania, United States

Erie International Airport Tom Ridge Field

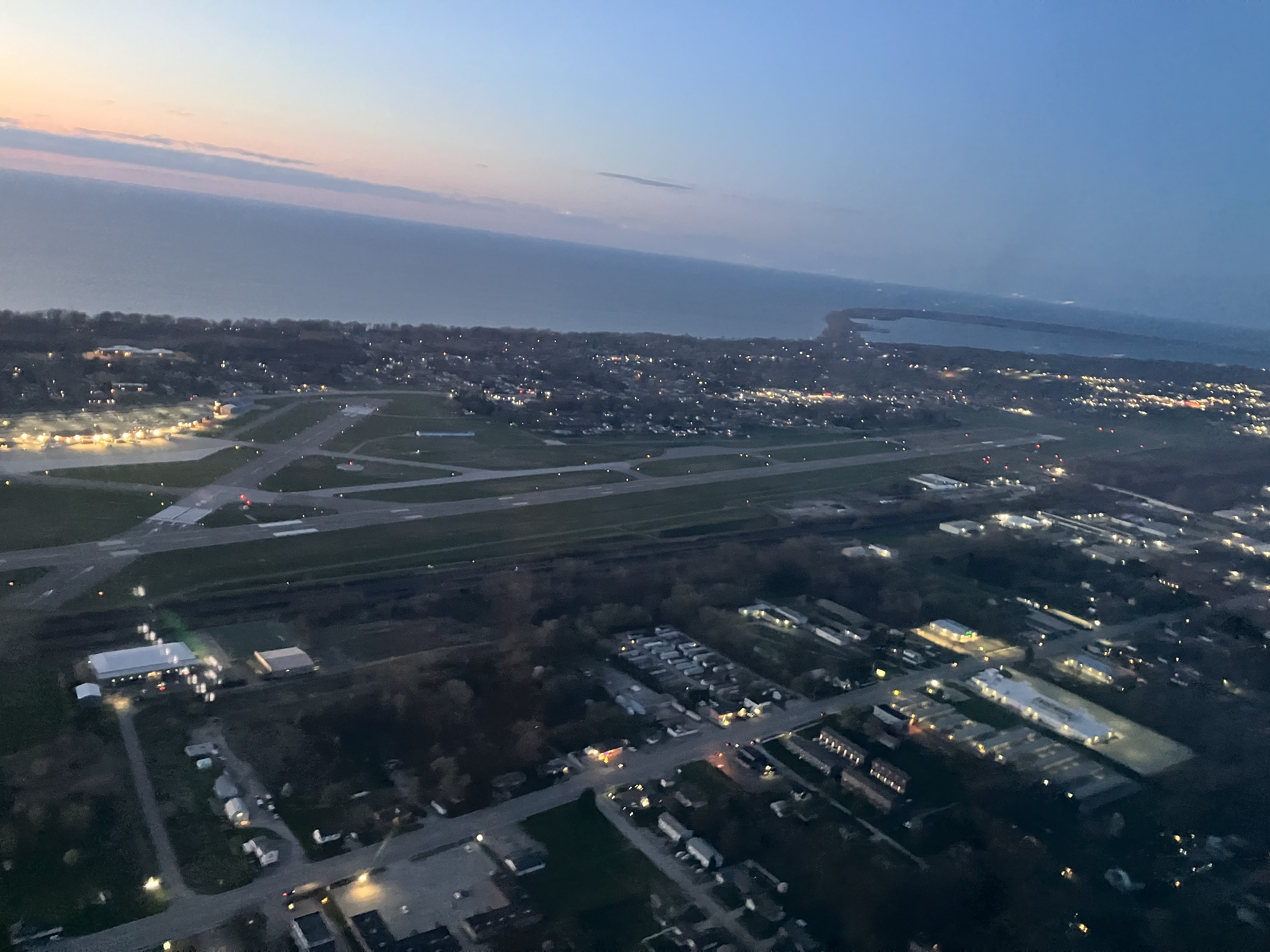
- View of the airport from 1000 ft above ground level
- IATA: ERI; ICAO: KERI; FAA LID: ERI

Summary
- Airport type: Public
- Owner: Erie Regional Airport Authority
- Serves: Erie, Pennsylvania
- Location: Millcreek Township, Erie County, Pennsylvania, United States
- Elevation AMSL: 732 ft (223 m)
- Coordinates: 42°4′59″N 80°10′55″W
- Website: www.erieairport.org

Maps
- FAA airport diagram
- Interactive map of Erie International Airport; Tom Ridge Field

Runways
Direction	Length		Surface
Direction	ft	m	Surface
2/20	3,508	1,069	Asphalt
6/24	8,420	2,566	Asphalt / concrete

Statistics
- Total Passengers (2025): 130,152
- Total Operations (2025): 31,007
- Source: Erie Regional Airport Authority

Erie International Airport Tom Ridge Field (IATA: ERI, ICAO: KERI, FAA LID: ERI) is a public airport five miles (8.0 km) southwest of Erie, in Erie County, Pennsylvania, United States. Airline service at Erie faces stiff competition from the Buffalo, Cleveland, and Pittsburgh airports, all within three hours of Erie by car. Erie is 97 miles from the Buffalo airport, 113 miles from the Cleveland airport, and 137 miles from the Pittsburgh airport.

The airport is named for former Pennsylvania governor, former United States Secretary of Homeland Security, and Erie native Tom Ridge.

== History ==
=== History ===
In 1924, Roger Griswold purchased 22.12 acres (9.0 ha) of land 6 miles (10 km) west of Erie at the intersection of West Lake and Asbury Roads for use as an airfield. Soon after, a flight training school was based at the field. In 1927, as part of a nationwide tour by Charles Lindbergh after his transatlantic flight, Erie was selected as one of the cities where Lindbergh would make a brief stopover. Griswold Field proved inadequate for the larger Spirit of St. Louis and an alternative site could not be located, so a flyover by Lindbergh had to suffice.

This showed the need for a proper airport and prompted the Erie City Council to consider establishing a municipal airport. City Council was, initially, favoring a site 1/2-mile (0.8 km) east of Wesleyville for a municipal airport, but Lieutenant Jimmy Doolittle commented on the distance between it and the city; Doolittle noted that "you might as well take 40 minutes more and go on to Cleveland." After recommendations made by Lindbergh to a Congressional committee that no airport less than 1 square mile (2.6 km^{2}) be approved, the planning commission for Erie's airport began to reevaluate the site.

Griswold Field officially closed in 1929 when Griswold moved to Long Island, but aircraft and the flight school continued to use it. That year two airfields were established: one on land next to the former Griswold Field, and another in Kearsarge that is now the site of the Millcreek Mall.

American Airlines began the airport's airline service June 15, 1938; American remained until 1953 when Allegheny replaced it. Pennsylvania-Central Airlines (later Capital) began service July 5, 1940. Mohawk arrived on December 1, 1956 and Lake Central on January 1, 1957; Capital Airlines flights ended in January 1961.

Prior to September 11, 2001, the airport was at its height with US Airways mainline jets to Pittsburgh and international service to Toronto. After 9/11 US Airways replaced 737s and DC-9s with regional jets. As air service rebounded in the mid-2000s, US Airways Express flew to Pittsburgh, Philadelphia and Charlotte; Northwest Airlink to Detroit; Continental Connection to Cleveland; and Delta Connection to Cincinnati and Atlanta. US Airways discontinued Charlotte flights in 2006. Delta Air Lines discontinued Atlanta flights on September 6, 2007. In early 2008 US Airways discontinued Pittsburgh flights.

On August 22, 2018, Derek Martin was named Executive Director of the airport.

On February 24, 2020, non-stop service to Washington Dulles International Airport (IAD) on United Express was announced. The service was made possible by a $292,000 grant from the U.S. Department of Transportation's Small Community Air Service Development Program.

On June 5, 2020, Delta announced that it would indefinitely suspend service starting July 8 due to the COVID-19 pandemic.

=== Current operations ===
American Eagle offers two or three times daily service (depending on season) onboard ERJ-145 aircraft operated by Piedmont Airlines to Charlotte, North Carolina, and once daily service to Chicago onboard Bombardier CRJ-700 aircraft operated by PSA Airlines..

Breeze Airways offers twice weekly service to Orlando, Florida, and twice weekly seasonal flights to Tampa, Florida.

United Airlines will return to Erie in October 2027 with three daily flights to Chicago onboard CRJ-550 and CRJ-200 aircraft operated by SkyWest Airlines.

=== Runway extension ===
The 1,920-foot (590 m) extension of runway 6/24 was opened on November 8, 2012. The total cost of the project was $80.5 million, or approximately $5 million under budget. Owing to a mild winter in 2011–2012 that did not hinder construction work, the extension was also completed two years ahead of schedule.

== Facilities ==
Erie International/Tom Ridge Field covers 450 acres (182 ha) and has two runways:

- Runway 2/20: 3,508 ft × 150 ft (1,069 m × 46 m), surface: asphalt
- Runway 6/24: 8,420 ft × 150 ft (2,566 m × 46 m), surface: asphalt/concrete

The airport has a passenger terminal building that opened in 1958 and has had several expansions and upgrades since its construction. The 1970s saw expansions to baggage claim facilities and later an office expansion for FAA office facilities on the second floor. A ticketing area on the western end of the terminal building was added in 1990. Upgrades to the lobby area and boarding gates and passenger boarding bridges followed in the late 1990s and early 2000s. The first floor of the passenger terminal building, which houses the baggage claim, check in desks, rental car counters, cafe, TSA checkpoint, and boarding gate areas occupies approximately 43,200 square feet.

In August 2019, the public waiting area and in-terminal restaurant were renovated. The entrance to the restaurant was reconfigured to provide airside access from the secure side of the terminal.

The terminal has seven gates, four with jetbridges for regional aircraft. Gate 5 was previously used by Delta Connection, and gates 1 and 3 were previously used by United Express, but both services have been suspended. Current regularly occupied gates are:

- Gate 5 - Breeze Airways
- Gate 7 - American Eagle

== Airlines and destinations ==
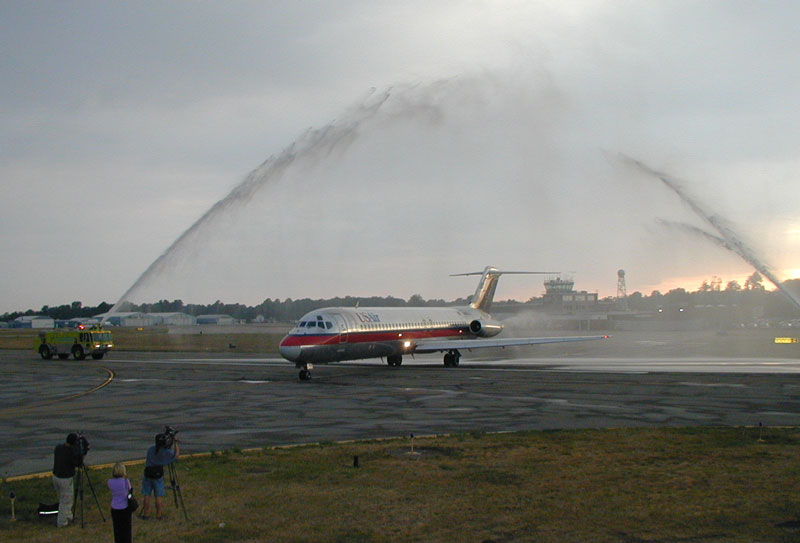
The last McDonnell Douglas DC-9 to fly for USAir arriving at Erie International Airport

=== Passenger ===
Airlines	Destinations
American Eagle	Charlotte, Chicago–O'Hare
Breeze Airways	Orlando; Seasonal: Tampa

== Statistics ==
=== Airline market share ===
Busiest airlines serving ERI (July 2025 – June 2026)
Rank	Carrier	Passengers	Share
1	Piedmont Airlines (as American Eagle)	87,710	67.59%
2	Breeze Airways	35,850	27.63%
3	PSA Airlines (as American Eagle)	4,400	3.39%
4	Skywest Airlines (as American Eagle)	1,790	1.38%

=== Top destinations ===
Busiest domestic routes from ERI (July 2025 – June 2026)
Rank	City	Passengers	Carriers
1	Charlotte, North Carolina	46,400	American
2	Orlando, Florida	11,550	Breeze
3	Tampa, Florida	6,430	Breeze
4	Chicago–O'Hare, Illinois	990	American

=== Annual traffic ===
Annual enplanements per year
Year	Passengers
2025	130,152
2024	93,312
2023	94,413
2022	123,351
2021	138,000
2020	43,354
2019	106,720
2018	95,136
2017	85,580
2016	87,568
2015	88,953
2014	97,063
2013	109,520
2012	109,185
2011	112,749
2010	127,184
2009	121,164
2008	124,667
2007	142,365
2006	161,087
2005	187,997
2004	176,112
2003	138,256
2002	130,244
2001	127,900
2000	155,618
1999	167,507

== Ground transportation ==
=== Bus ===
The Erie Metropolitan Transit Authority's Route 31 includes a stop at the airport.

=== Car rental ===
Avis Rent a Car System, Budget Rent a Car, Enterprise Rent-A-Car, The Hertz Corporation, and National Car Rental have counters at the airport.

=== Shuttle/limousine ===
Various local hotels, along with the locally owned Hansen's Errand Service and Rupp Limousine, provide shuttle services to and from the airport.

=== Rideshare ===
Local drivers for Uber and Lyft provide ridesharing services to and from the airport and throughout the Erie area.

== Accidents and incidents ==
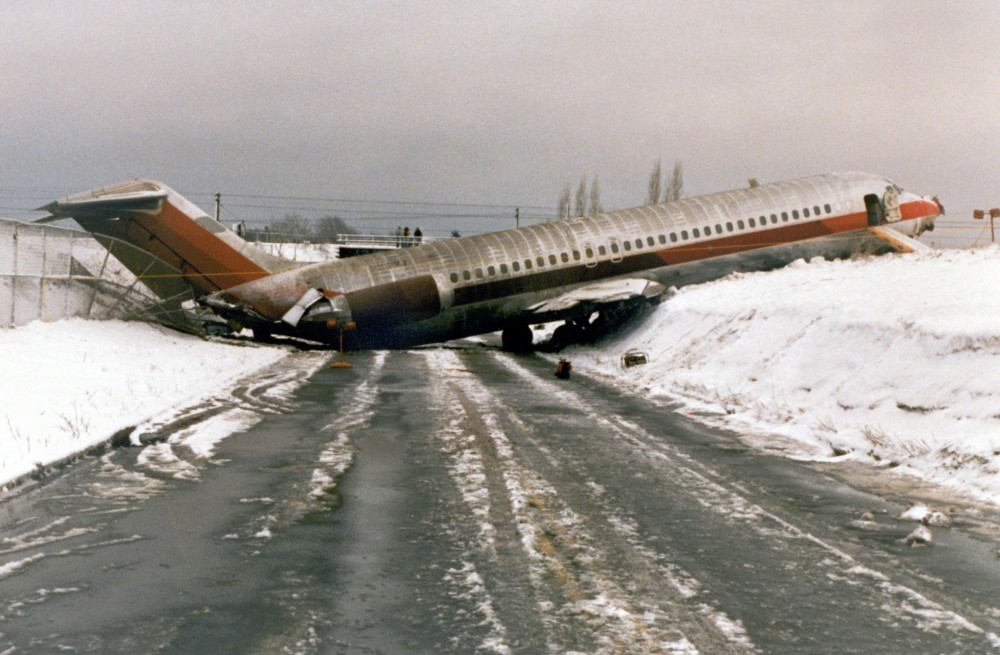
The aftermath of the USAir Flight 499 runway overrun

- On February 21, 1986, USAir Flight 499, a scheduled domestic passenger flight operated by a McDonnell Douglas DC-9-31, aircraft registration N961VJ, overran the runway after the pilots broke off an approach to runway 6 due to poor visibility and landed in the opposite direction on runway 24 due to more favorable visibility minimums, despite a resulting tailwind. One passenger suffered minor injuries, while the other 17 passengers and 5 crew were uninjured. The aircraft was badly damaged and was written off. Challenging weather conditions were a factor; it was snowing and foggy, and snow covered the runway. The accident was attributed to poor judgment by the pilots; tailwind landings on runway 24 were not authorized in slippery conditions, but the pilots disregarded the prohibition, touched down past the normal landing zone at an excessive airspeed rather than performing a go-around, and failed to promptly deploy the spoilers manually, a standard DC-9 precautionary procedure on a slippery runway where the nosewheel may not spin up quickly enough to trigger the automatic spoiler system to slow the aircraft.
- June 8, 2000: A Beechcraft BE-55 Baron, registration number N777K, lost engine power on approach after the pilot realized the left-hand tank was empty and attempted to cross-feed the left-hand engine from the right-hand fuel tank. The aircraft was destroyed in the subsequent crash and post-crash fire; the pilot, who was the sole aircraft occupant, suffered minor injuries. The accident was attributed to fuel starvation caused by fuel system mismanagement and inadequate preflight planning.
- August 13, 2005: A Piper PA-28-180, registration number N7534W, lost engine power on approach and struck trees during an attempted forced landing about 1 mile (1.6 km) short of runway 24, killing the pilot and two passengers; another passenger suffered serious injuries. The accident was attributed to fuel starvation caused by inadequate preflight planning.

== See also ==
- List of airports in Pennsylvania

== Sources ==
- Federal Writers' Project (1938). Erie, A Guide to the City and County. Philadelphia: William Penn Association. OCLC 5429724.
- Freeman, Sabina Shields (2014). From Griswold Field to Erie International. Fairview, Pennsylvania: Hi Flight Press.
- McCormick, Carroll (January–February 2013). "Runway to Prosperity". Airports International. 46 (1). Key Publishing: 34–36.
