= Transportation in Erie, Pennsylvania =

Transportation in Erie, Pennsylvania includes access to most major forms of transportation, including automobile, bus, train, taxi, airplane, and ship. The city generates income through the transportation industry, including train manufacturing and port operations.

== Streets and Highways ==
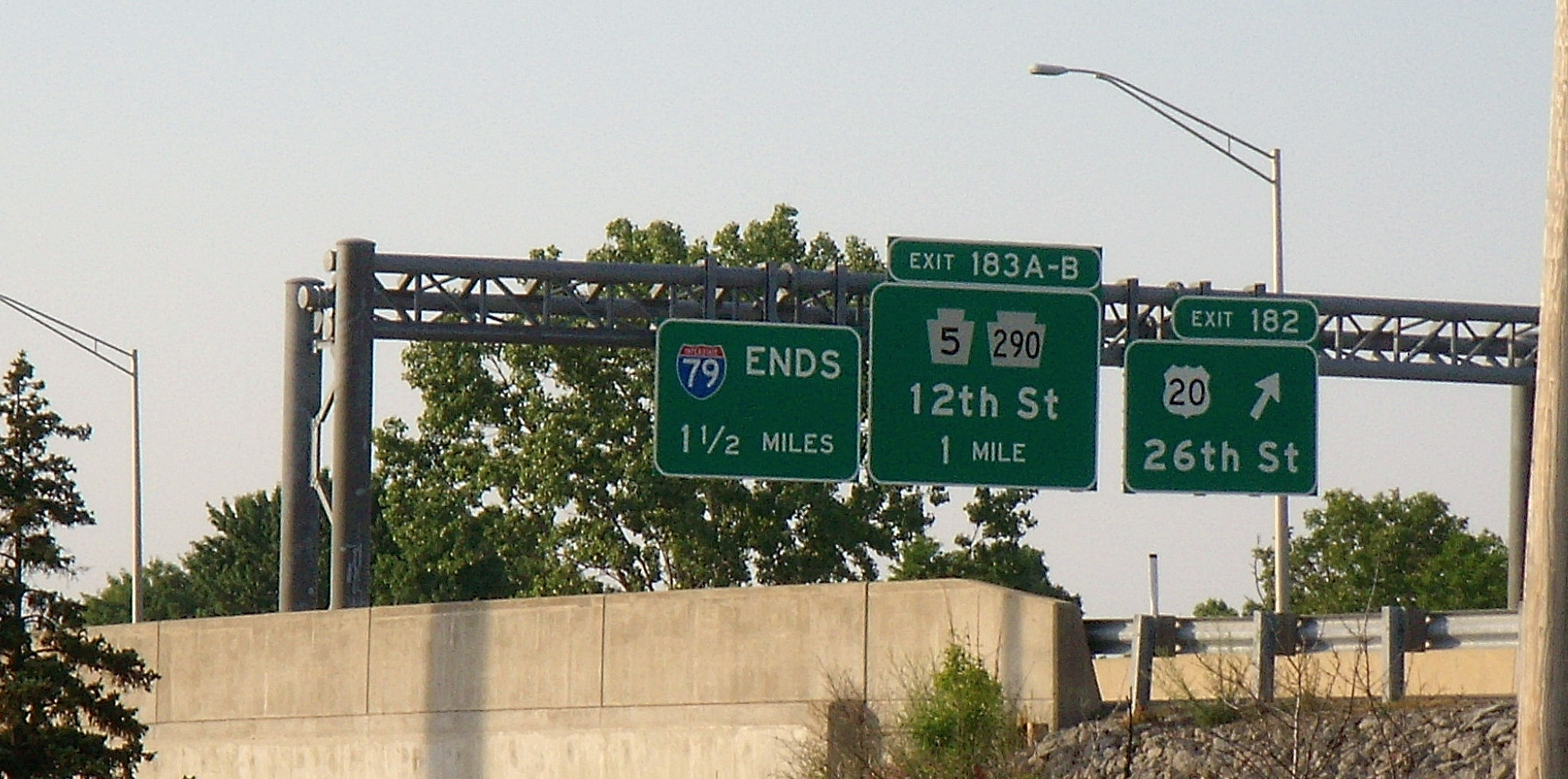
Exit signs for US 20, PA 5, PA 290 and the terminus for I-79.

Erie is well connected to the Interstate Highway System. Six highway exits from Interstate 90 (I-90) connect travelers to Erie from Boston, Massachusetts and points east, and from Cleveland, Ohio and points west. Those traveling north to Erie on I-79 can either merge with I-90 or continue north for several local Erie exits before the road merges into the Bayfront Parkway in downtown Erie. Southbound travelers of I-79 can connect with I-80 for points east to New Jersey or west to Akron, Ohio or Youngstown, Ohio, or continue south on Interstate 79 to Pittsburgh, Pennsylvania and Charleston, West Virginia. I-86, also called the "Southern Tier Expressway," splits from I-90 at North East, Pennsylvania and heads southeast through New York State to Binghamton.

The city has a number of important arterial roads. Pennsylvania Route 5 (12th Street), U.S. Route 20 (26th Street and Buffalo Road), and 38th Street are major east-west routes through Erie's municipal roadway grid. The town is divided east from west at State Street, a major thoroughfare in downtown Erie. U.S. Route 19 is a major southwesterly route from downtown to a shopping area north of I-90 known to locals as Upper Peach Street.

== Bus ==
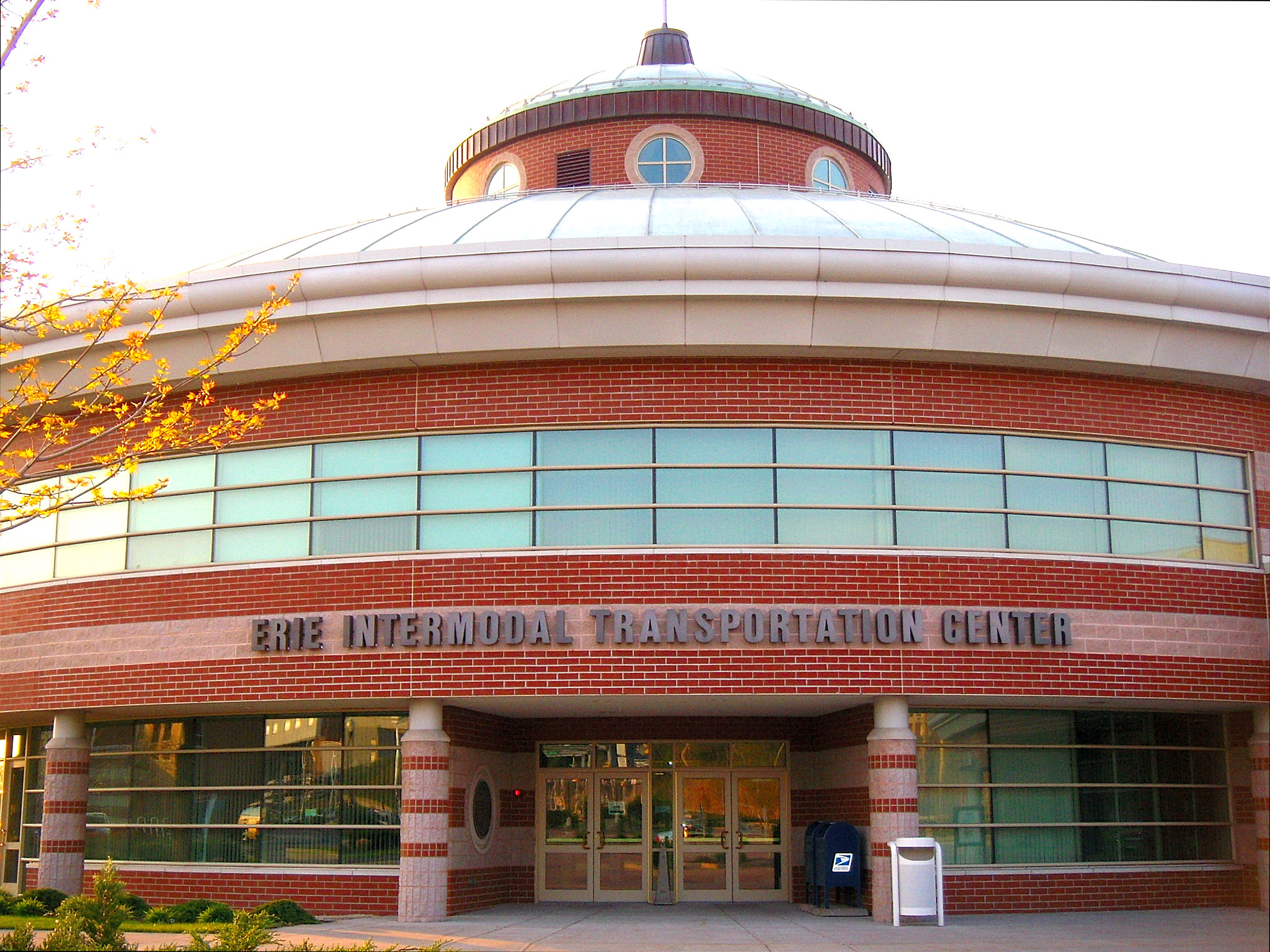
The Intermodal Transportation Center at the end of Holland Street

The Erie Metropolitan Transit Authority (EMTA) operates local and regional bus service seven days a week, except holidays. A new city bus terminal opened in 2006. Connections are available to water taxi, rail services, and the airport.

The Intermodal Transportation Center, which opened in 2002 at the Holland Street Pier, includes a commercial bus terminal. Greyhound Lines and Fullington Trailways provide daily bus service, including routes with local stops between Erie and DuBois and Pittsburgh, with connections to other destinations.

== Rail ==
The former "Water Level Route" of the New York Central Railroad (now the CSX mainline) travels directly through Erie. This is a major mainline for the railroad and sees scores of trains a day. The mainline of the Norfolk Southern Railway at one time ran directly down the middle of 19th Street in the city. The 19th Street tracks were recently removed. The 19th Street rail traffic is now routed onto the aforementioned transcontinental mainline.

An Amtrak train calls on the city twice daily (at 1:36 AM for the westbound train and 8:30 AM for the eastbound one) at Union Station in downtown Erie: the Lake Shore Limited, running between New York, Boston, and Chicago. Amtrak recently announced that the 5:39 AM departure would be pushed up to 8:30 AM. There has been discussion in recent years in favor of adding trains along the southern shore of Lake Erie to link Buffalo with Cleveland, and beyond.

== Air ==
Erie International Airport (IATA: ERI; ICAO: KERI), located 5 miles (8 km) southwest of the city, hosts general aviation, charter, and scheduled airline service. Airlines currently serving Erie include American Airlines and Breeze Airways. Tom Ridge Field was recognized by the Pennsylvania Department of Transportation as the fastest-growing airport in the state in 2005. It was also listed as the 3rd fastest-growing airport in the United States by the US Department of Transportation in 2004.

== Taxi ==
Lyft and Uber are available in Erie. The Erie Yellow Cab Company used to operate seven days a week in the city before closing June 2019. However, other businesses such as Hansen's services and Rupp Limousine services are available.

== Water ==
The Port of Erie is located within Presque Isle Bay, a natural harbor off Lake Erie formed by Presque Isle State Park. The Erie–Western Pennsylvania Port Authority is the port authority for the Port of Erie based on the Third Class City Port Authority Act of 1972, P.L. 1392, No. 298. The authority has "the power to plan, acquire, construct, maintain and operate facilities and projects for the improvement, development and operation of the port." It has received millions of dollars in grants for projects related to the port. See list of grants

According to the authority, the port operates "the largest dry-dock and crane (200 ton) on the Great Lakes, a full-service shipyard, 300,000 sq ft (28,000 m^{2}) of warehouse space, a Foreign Trade Zone, an 80-acre (320,000 m^{2}) Keystone Opportunity Zone, 6,000 feet (1,800 m) of deep draft dock face and over 200 private dock face."

The Presque Isle Water Taxi is operated by the Port Authority in the summer months between Dobbins Landing and Liberty Park in downtown Erie, and the Waterworks ferry landing on Presque Isle.

A channel on the east side of Presque Isle allows ships to transit between the bay and Lake Erie. Only one cruise service serves the port and does not dock at the Cruise Terminal at the foot of Holland Street; rather at Dobbin's Landing. A Great American Waterways cruise makes a 15-day run from Chicago to Warren, Rhode Island, with a stop in Erie on the eastern leg of the journey. The Great Lakes Cruise Company and the American Canadian Cruise Line both advertise this cruise.

== Regional planning ==
Erie's Metropolitan Planning Organization (MPO) is required to carry out transportation planning in cooperation with the Pennsylvania Department of Transportation and with the Erie Metropolitan Transit Authority. There are fifteen MPO's in the state of Pennsylvania. MPO members include local elected officials, representatives of major modes of transportation, PennDOT, and other transportation stakeholders. Federal and State transportation regulations require urban areas of 50,000 or more in population to have an MPO, which is to do short-term (4 year) and long-term (20+ year) transportation planning.

== See also ==
- Plug-in electric vehicles in Pennsylvania § Erie
