= Cooper Cousins =

American football player

No. 50 – Penn State Nittany Lions
- Position: Offensive guard
- Class: Junior

Personal information
- Listed height: 6 ft 6 in (1.98 m)
- Listed weight: 320 lb (145 kg)

Career information
- High school: McDowell (Millcreek, Pennsylvania)
- College: Penn State (2024–present)
- Stats at ESPN

James Cooper Cousins is an American football offensive guard for the Penn State Nittany Lions.

== Early life ==
Cousins attended McDowell High School in Millcreek, Pennsylvania. He committed to play college football for the Penn State Nittany Lions over offers from schools such as Akron, Kentucky, Pittsburgh, and Toledo.

== College career ==
As a freshman in 2024, Cousins played in all 16 games for the Nittany Lions. As a sophomore in 2025, he appeared in 12 games, making two starts. Cousins entered the 2026 season, in line to earn a starting spot on the Nittany Lions offensive line.
