= Fernando Frye =

American football player (born 1997)

No. 66
- Position: Guard

Personal information
- Born: March 6, 1997 (age 29); Erie, Pennsylvania, U.S.
- Listed height: 6 ft 3 in (1.91 m)
- Listed weight: 280 lb (127 kg)

Career information
- High school: McDowell (Millcreek Township, Pennsylvania)
- College: East Carolina
- NFL draft: 2022: undrafted

Career history
- Tucson Sugar Skulls (2023); Vegas Vipers (2023)

Fernando Frye (born March 6, 1997) is an American former football guard and center. He played college football at East Carolina.

== College career ==
Frye originally played for Mercyhurst University spending two years with the program where he spent the 2015 and 2016 seasons before joining East Carolina as a walk-on transfer. After spending his first year on campus as a scout team member, he worked his way into the starting lineup in 2018 season.

Frye entered his name for the 2022 NFL draft after finishing his final season at East Carolina. He went undrafted.

== Professional career ==
On November 16, 2022, during the 2023 XFL draft, Frye was selected as the 84th pick of the 11th round by the Vegas Vipers. He signed with the team on April 11, 2023. The Vipers folded when the XFL and USFL merged to create the United Football League (UFL).

== Personal life ==
Frye attended McDowell High School in Millcreek Township, Pennsylvania. During his time at East Carolina University he majored in criminal justice.

He is the son of Jendi Frye and has two siblings Dylan and Kylie.
