= Travis Dermott =

Canadian ice hockey player (born 1996)

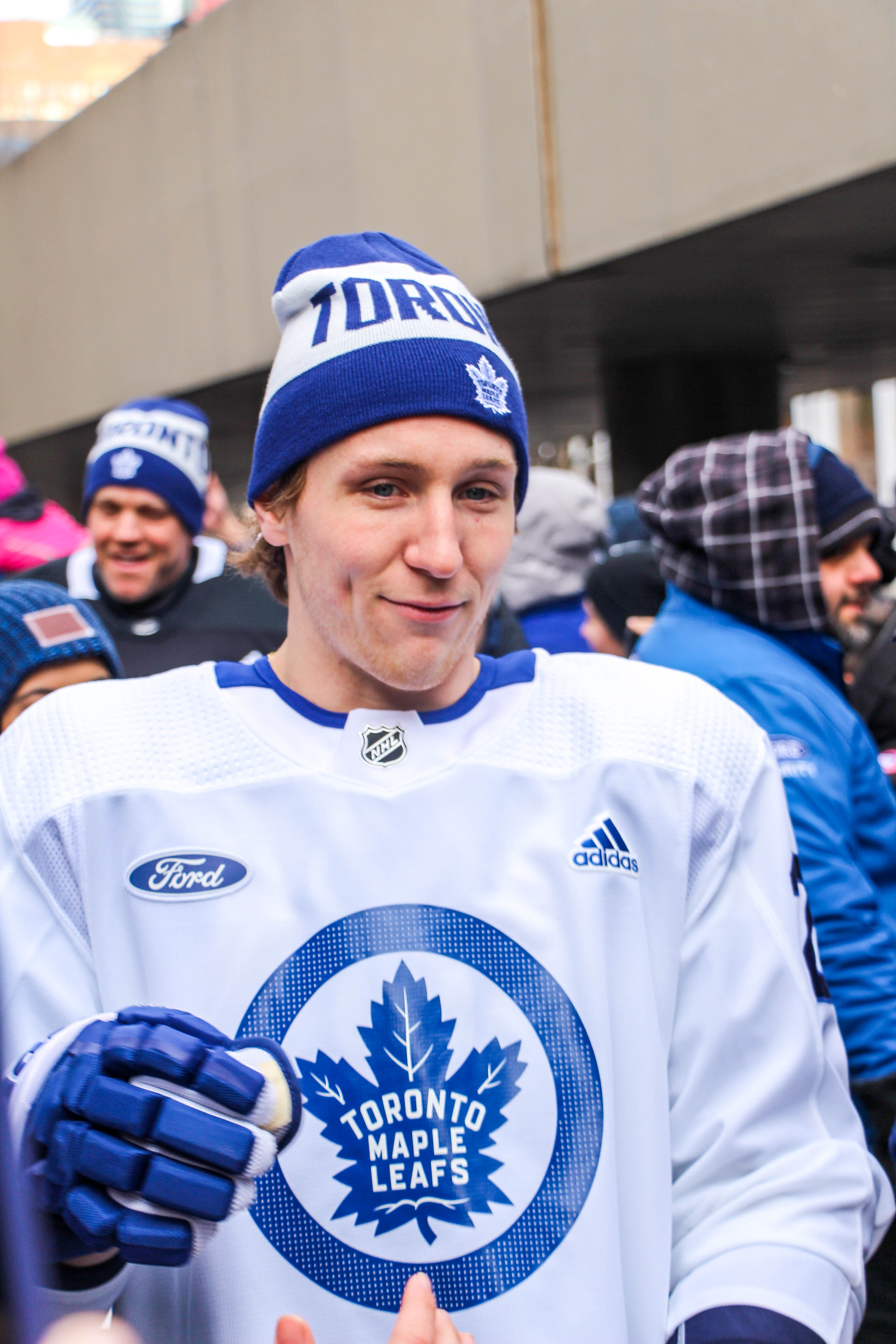
- Dermott with the Toronto Maple Leafs in 2020
- Born: December 22, 1996 (age 29) Newmarket, Ontario, Canada
- Height: 6 ft 0 in (183 cm)
- Weight: 200 lb (91 kg; 14 st 4 lb)
- Position: Defence
- Shoots: Left
- team Former teams: Free agent Toronto Maple Leafs; Vancouver Canucks; Arizona Coyotes; Edmonton Oilers; Minnesota Wild
- NHL draft: 34th overall, 2015; Toronto Maple Leafs
- Playing career: 2016–present

Travis Dermott (born December 22, 1996) is a Canadian professional ice hockey defenceman who is currently an unrestricted free agent. He most recently played on a professional tryout with the Hartford Wolf Pack of the American Hockey League (AHL).

Dermott was rated as a top prospect projected as a possible first round pick in the 2015 NHL entry draft but was ultimately selected in the second round, 34th overall, by the Toronto Maple Leafs. He has previously played for the Maple Leafs, the Vancouver Canucks, the Arizona Coyotes, and the Minnesota Wild.

In junior, Dermott was drafted by the Erie Otters in the 2012 Ontario Hockey League draft. His tenure with the team stretched over three seasons and he was named to the 2014 First All-Rookie Team. He has also competed with Canada men's national junior ice hockey team at the 2016 IIHF World U20 Championship.

After making his professional career debut in 2016 with the Maple Leafs' American Hockey League (AHL) affiliate, the Toronto Marlies, Dermott was utilized on the team's penalty-kill and moved to the right hand side as a left-handed shot. He made his NHL debut in 2018 and, after losing to the Boston Bruins in the first round, went on to help the Marlies win their first Calder Cup in franchise history.

== Early life ==
Dermott was born on December 22, 1996, in Newmarket, Ontario, Canada to parents Jim and Paula Dermott. He grew up with an older sister. His mother, who is a retired figure skater, first encouraged him to begin skating before the age of four and eventually signed him up for Timbits hockey. He eventually graduated to the Super 7 Tyke Team in Newmarket by the age of seven with his father as his coach. Growing up, Dermott's favourite team was the Chicago Blackhawks and his favourite player was Duncan Keith. Besides hockey, he also played lacrosse with future Erie Otters teammate Connor McDavid.

== Playing career ==
=== Youth ===
Dermott began his youth hockey career with the Minor Midget “AAA” York Simcoe Express. During the 2010–11 season, he broke his collarbone twice causing him to only play in 19 games. During his tenure with the Express, Dermott helped the team win five OMHA championships and an OHF peewee title. Scouts witnessed Dermott's success and he was offered a try out with an East Coast select spring hockey team and signed with the Newmarket Hurricanes in the Ontario Junior Hockey League (OJHL).

He was later drafted by the Erie Otters in the 2012 Ontario Hockey League (OHL) draft but continued to play with the Newmarket Hurricanes. After being named to the OJHL's 2nd Team All-Stars and Fan Favourite, he committed to play for the Erie Otters on May 4, 2013. During his tenure with the Otters, Dermott attended McDowell High School and was named Midwest Division Academic Player of the Month for January 2014. Following a strong first year performance with the Erie Otters in which he scored 28 points in 67 games, Dermott was rewarded when he was named to the 2013–14 OHL First All-Rookie Team.

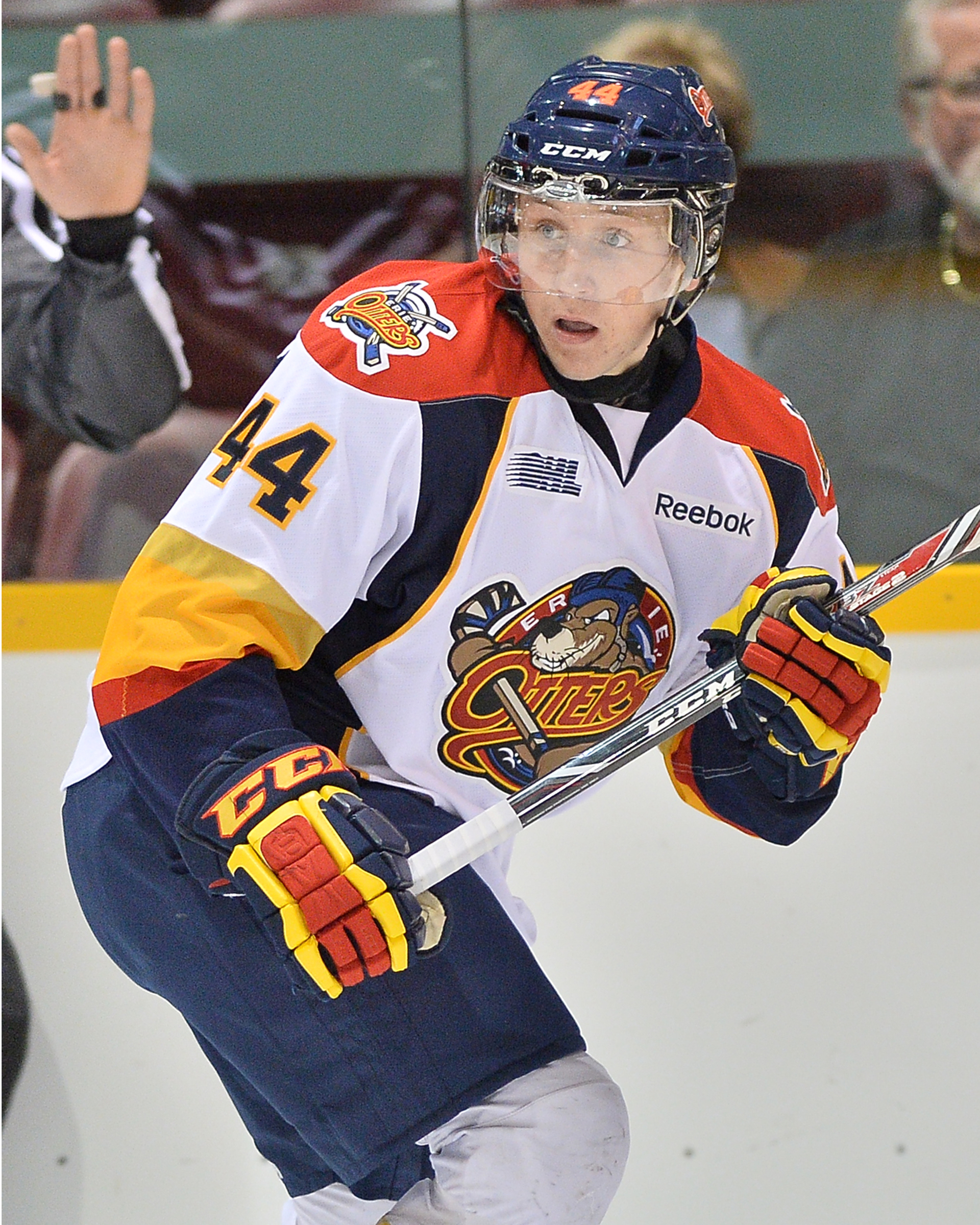
Dermott with the Otters in 2013

During following season, Dermott scored 45 points in 61 games, including a franchise record seven-game assist streak which was the longest such stretch by a defenceman. He also led all Erie defencemen in playoff scoring with 17 points earning him a jump in ratings and a projection as a possible first round pick. Dermott attested his scoring prowess as the result of filling in for a suspended Kurtis MacDermid and practicing with former NHL defenceman Jay McKee. The NHL Central Scouting Bureau ranked Dermott 46th amongst North American skaters, a boost from his midterm ranking of 47.

Dermott was eventually drafted 34th overall by the Toronto Maple Leafs in the 2015 NHL entry draft and signed a three-year, entry-level contract with them on July 22, 2015. Prior to his draft, Dermott began training with Dave Harris at Iperformance. He returned to the Otters for his final year of major junior hockey after attending the Leafs training camp. On December 1, 2015, Dermott and teammate Dylan Strome were selected to compete with Team Canada at the 2016 World Junior Ice Hockey Championships. Upon returning from Finland empty handed, Dermott was ejected from a game against the Mississauga Steelheads for a hit to the head on Owen Tippett. After the game concluded, he was assessed a five-game suspension following a hearing. Although the Otters qualified for the 2016 OHL Playoffs, they were swept in the OHLs Western Conference final by the London Knights.

=== Professional ===
==== Toronto Maple Leafs ====
After the Otters were swept in the Western Conference final, Dermott joined the Toronto Marlies for the 2016 Calder Cup playoffs. He made his professional post-season debut with the Marlies during the third round of the playoffs as a replacement for Stuart Percy before they were ultimately eliminated by the Hershey Bears.

On August 26, 2016, Dermott was selected to compete at the Maple Leafs 2016 Rookie Tournament and their 2016 training camp. After participating in both, he was returned to the Toronto Marlies for their 2016–17 season. Dermott made his AHL debut on October 16, 2016, where he recorded his first career AHL goal and assist in a win against the Utica Comets. He concluded his rookie season with the Marlies having recorded 24 points in 59 games, earning him a second-place finish amongst Marlies defencemen in scoring.

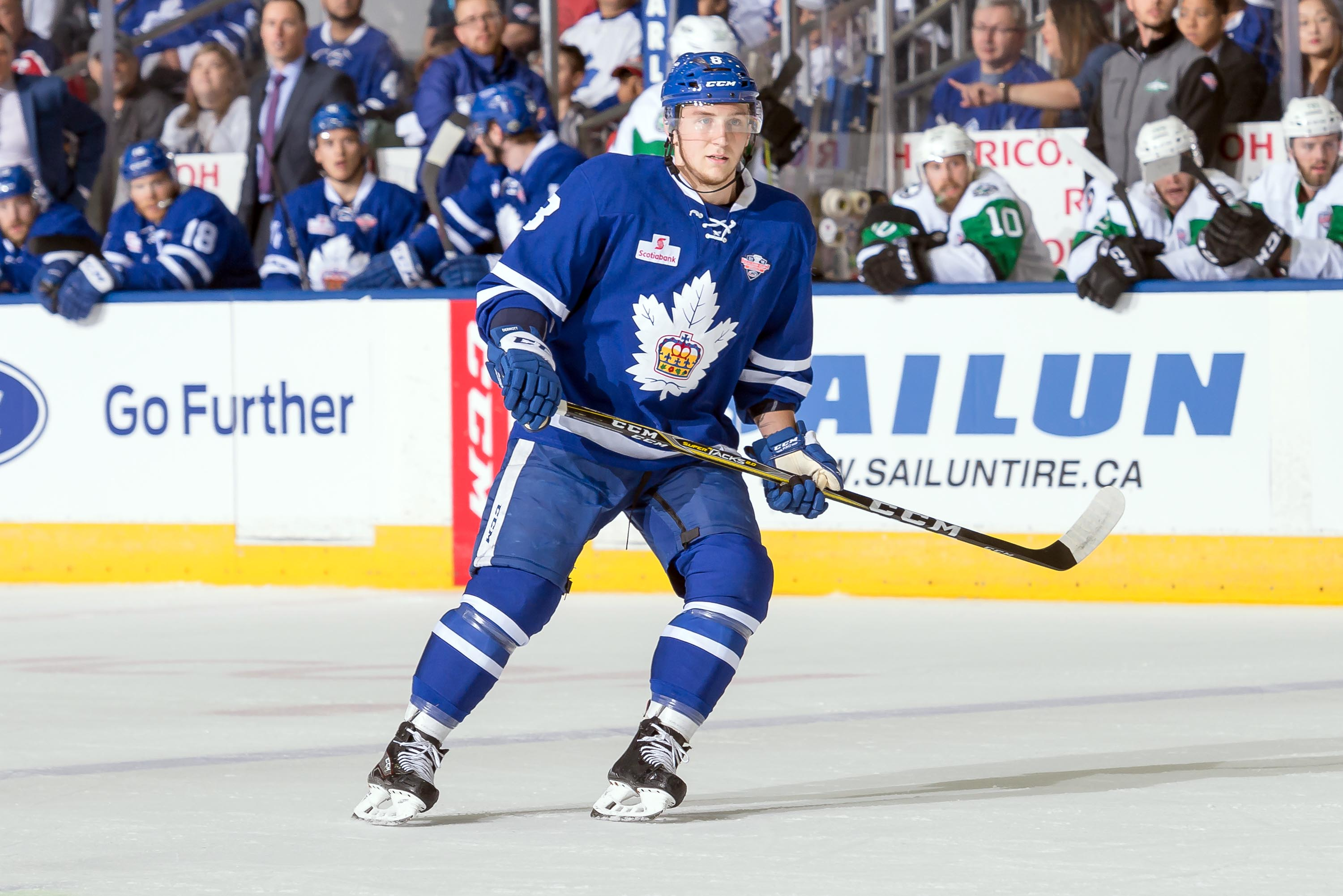
Dermott with the Toronto Marlies during the 2018 Calder Cup Final

The following year, Dermott was again selected to participate in the Leafs Rookie Tournament, but was reassigned to the Marlies to begin the season. He played on a defensive pairing with Timothy Liljegren and earned time on the penalty-kill. Although he was a left-handed shooter, he was moved to the right hand side. Dermott's playmaking ability earned him his first NHL recall on January 5, 2018 where he recorded one assist in two games before being sent back down to the Marlies on January 11, 2018. While with the Marlies again, Dermott was named to the 2018 AHL All-Star Classic alongside teammate Kasperi Kapanen. Following another recall on January 15 with fellow Marlies player Frédérik Gauthier, he was given the number 23 to wear instead of his usual 3. That night, he scored his first career NHL goal in the leafs 5–0 win against the New York Islanders on January 31. Dermott stayed will the Leafs as they qualified for the 2018 Stanley Cup playoffs against the Boston Bruins and recorded his first playoff goal during Game 7 to tie the game 3–3, although the Leafs ended up losing the game 7–4. Despite playing in the NHL playoff series, Dermott, Andreas Johnsson, and Kasperi Kapanen remained eligible to compete in the 2018 Calder Cup playoffs. After the Leafs were eliminated from the playoffs, Dermott was sent to the Marlies to help them in their 2018 Calder Cup playoffs run. He ended his rookie campaign with the Leafs recording one goal and 12 assists in 37 regular season games. Upon returning to the Toronto Marlies lineup, he helped them win their first Calder Cup in franchise history following a seven–game playoff series against the Texas Stars.

On the heels of his successful rookie campaign, Dermott began the 2018–19 season with the Leafs in the NHL for the first time in his career. As the youngest defenceman on the Leafs roster, Dermott played on a pairing with Ron Hainsey with the goal of moving him to Morgan Rielly's side. Former head coach Mike Babcock stated that “[Dermott’s issues] are all the things that are no different than Morgan Rielly....Everyone raves about you, but you’re a dash all the time. The puck is going in your net all the time. So you have to figure that out over time. That’s what the league is all about.” He played in 24 games until teammate William Nylander returned to the lineup following a contract dispute on December 2, 2018. Dermott was loaned to the Marlies temporarily to make room for Nylander in the Leafs lineup but returned for their following game against the Buffalo Sabres. Upon returning, he continued to play with the Leafs until February 27, 2019, when he suffered a shoulder injury. As a result, he was out of the lineup for a month before eventually returning to finish the regular season and playoffs with the Leafs. He underwent shoulder surgery during the offseason after the Leafs were eliminated in the first round the 2019 Stanley Cup playoffs.

Although the 2019–20 season would eventually be delayed due to COVID-19, Dermott began the season in late October as he recovered from his surgery in May. In the final year of his contract, Dermott began seeing playing time on the top defenceman pairing after Morgan Rielly and Jake Muzzin suffered injuries. Following the hiring of Sheldon Keefe, who Dermott played under with the Marlies, he was paired with Justin Holl to replace those on the top pair. Although he was again shortly sidelined due to an illness, he only missed one game to recover. Under the guidance of Keefe, Dermott averaged nearly 19 minutes of ice time per game playing beside Holl and helped the team outscore opponents 4–1.

On October 23, 2020, Dermott signed a one-year, $874,125 contract extension with the Maple Leafs. Dermott played in 51 games with the Leafs that year, scoring two goals and six points but saw his ice time diminish from previous seasons. On July 8, 2021, Dermott signed a two-year, $3 million extension with the Maple Leafs. Dermott was left exposed by the Maple Leafs in the 2021 NHL expansion draft, but the Seattle Kraken chose to select Jared McCann from the Leafs. During the 2021–22 season Dermott played in 43 games with the Maple Leafs scoring one goal and five points. During the season he was surpassed by Rasmus Sandin and Timothy Liljegren on the Maple Leafs depth chart.

==== Vancouver Canucks ====
On March 20, 2022, one day before the trade deadline, Dermott was traded by the Maple Leafs to the Vancouver Canucks, in exchange for a 2022 third-round draft pick. He played in 18 games with the Canucks to finish off the season. During the 2022–23 season Dermott suffered a concussion during a practice on September 27, 2022 and remained out of the lineup until December 29. He played in 11 games with Vancouver before suffering another injury that saw him placed on injured reserve. He missed the rest of the season. At the end of the season Dermott was a restricted free agent. However, the Canucks chose not to provide him with a qualifying offer, making him an unrestricted free agent.

==== Arizona Coyotes ====
On July 11, 2023, Dermott was signed to a one-year, two-way contract with the Arizona Coyotes for the 2023–24 season. The contract carried an NHL salary of $800,000 and an AHL salary of $450,000. Dermott attracted attention shortly into his tenure with the Coyotes when, during the team's October 21 home opener game, he became the first NHL player to defy the league's new ban on the use of Pride-themed hockey tape. The NHL, NHL Player's Association, and NHL Player Inclusion Coalition reviewed Dermott's action, and ultimately, the ban on Pride tape was rescinded. Dermott had used pride tape regularly since he'd been in the AHL. He had only waited until a new shipment had arrived after misplacing his supply during his move from Vancouver.

==== Edmonton Oilers and Minnesota Wild ====
Having concluded his tenure with the Coyotes, Dermott as a free agent was un-signed over the summer. On September 14, 2024, Dermott accepted an invitation to attend the Edmonton Oilers training camp for the 2024–25 season on a professional tryout (PTO). Dermott had a successful training camp and his PTO was converted into a one-year, two-way contract with the Oilers for the 2024–25 season. As a depth defenceman, Dermott went scoreless through 10 appearances with the Oilers before he was placed on waivers and claimed by the Minnesota Wild on December 13, 2024. He was reclaimed by the Oilers on February 26, 2025 and was sent down to the Bakersfield Condors.

==== Later career ====
On 25 November 2025, Sportsnet's Elliotte Friedman reported that Dermott underwent left shoulder surgery on July 23, and was looking to resume his career. During the 2025–26 season, on 7 February 2026, Dermott signed a professional tryout (PTO) with the Hartford Wolf Pack of the American Hockey League (AHL). Affiliate to the New York Rangers, Dermott made 5 appearances with the Wolf Pack, posting 3 assists before leaving the club on April 13, 2026.

== Personal life ==
Dermott and his dog Niylah appeared in a dog food commercial for Nulo and work as ambassadors. He also signed a multi-year contract with Levelwear Pro-Sports business and club partnership.

He earned the nickname "Skin Doctor" from the Toronto Maple Leafs as a play on his last name Dermott into dermatologist.

Dermott is married to Katerina Di Lucia and has two children, Rosa and James.

== Career statistics ==
=== Regular season and playoffs ===
			Regular season					Playoffs
Season	Team	League	GP	G	A	Pts	PIM	GP	G	A	Pts	PIM
2012–13	Newmarket Hurricanes	OJHL	53	1	14	15	24	24	4	11	15	4
2013–14	Erie Otters	OHL	67	3	25	28	45	14	0	5	5	8
2014–15	Erie Otters	OHL	61	8	37	45	53	19	5	12	17	20
2015–16	Erie Otters	OHL	51	6	37	43	65	13	3	11	14	14
2015–16	Toronto Marlies	AHL	—	—	—	—	—	1	0	0	0	0
2016–17	Toronto Marlies	AHL	59	5	19	24	60	11	1	4	5	2
2017–18	Toronto Marlies	AHL	28	2	16	18	34	14	1	3	4	18
2017–18	Toronto Maple Leafs	NHL	37	1	12	13	8	7	1	0	1	2
2018–19	Toronto Maple Leafs	NHL	64	4	13	17	22	7	1	2	3	2
2019–20	Toronto Maple Leafs	NHL	56	4	7	11	37	5	0	1	1	4
2020–21	Toronto Maple Leafs	NHL	51	2	4	6	19	3	0	0	0	0
2021–22	Toronto Maple Leafs	NHL	43	1	4	5	14	—	—	—	—	—
2021–22	Vancouver Canucks	NHL	17	1	1	2	0	—	—	—	—	—
2022–23	Abbotsford Canucks	AHL	1	0	0	0	0	—	—	—	—	—
2022–23	Vancouver Canucks	NHL	11	1	0	1	2	—	—	—	—	—
2023–24	Arizona Coyotes	NHL	50	2	5	7	26	—	—	—	—	—
2024–25	Edmonton Oilers	NHL	10	0	0	0	2	—	—	—	—	—
2024–25	Minnesota Wild	NHL	9	0	0	0	0	—	—	—	—	—
2024–25	Bakersfield Condors	AHL	3	1	0	1	0	—	—	—	—	—
2025–26	Hartford Wolf Pack	AHL	5	0	3	3	2	—	—	—	—	—
NHL totals			348	16	46	62	130	22	2	3	5	8

=== International ===
Year	Team	Event	Result	GP	G	A	Pts	PIM
2016	Canada	WJC	6th	5	0	2	2	2
Junior totals				5	0	2	2	2

== Awards and honours ==
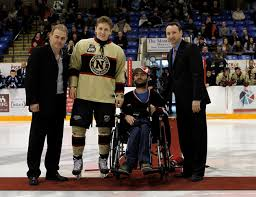
Dermott was awarded the OJHL's Fan Favourite Award in 2013.

Award	Year	Ref
OJHL
Fan Favorite Award	2013	
2nd Team All-Stars	2013	
OHL
First All-Rookie Team	2014	
AHL
Calder Cup champion	2018	
AHL All-Star Classic	2018	
