= Erie Metropolitan Transit Authority =

EMTA Transit

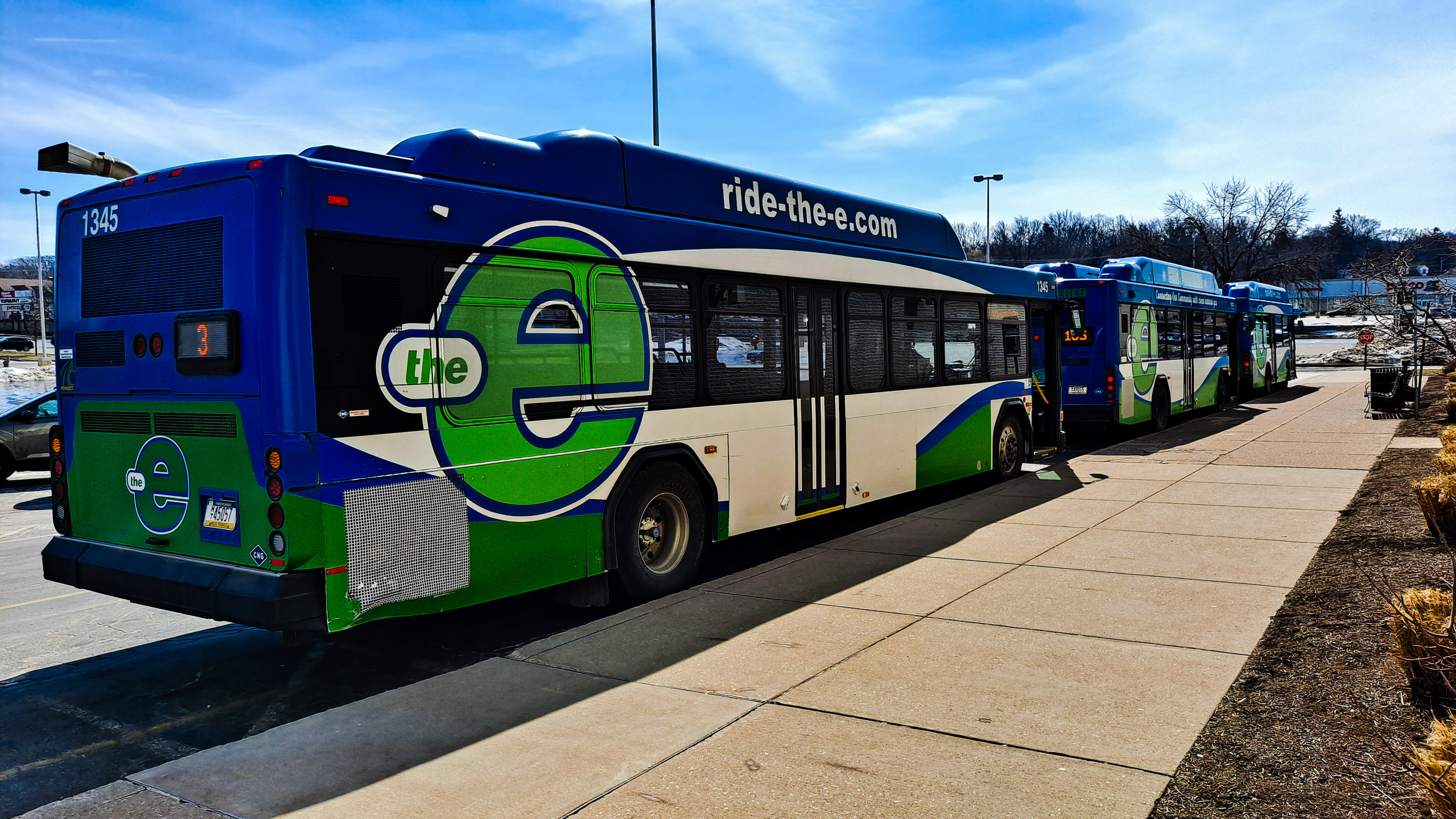
- Current livery
- Founded: September 14, 1966
- Headquarters: 127 East 14th Street; Erie, Pennsylvania, United States
- Service area: Erie County
- Service type: Bus
- Routes: 25
- Hubs: 1
- Fleet: 80 buses
- Annual ridership: 2,743,473 (2018) ▼5.87% from 2017
- Fuel type: Diesel, CNG
- Chief executive: Jeremy Peterson
- Website: www.ride-the-e.com

The Erie Metropolitan Transit Authority (EMTA) is the Municipal Authority that owns and operates the public transport system in Erie County, Pennsylvania which includes the 'e', the area's transit buses; LIFT, the county paratransit service; and Bayliner Trolley, the downtown circulator.

== History ==
A newspaper photograph of an early EMTA bus and streetcar.

The first public transportation system in Erie was established on March 1, 1897, as the Erie City Passenger Railway Company. On October 8, 1888, the Erie Electric Motor Company took control of the Erie City Passenger Railway. The Conneaut and Erie Railway Traction Company was formed in 1903 and ran trolleys to east of the city. On December 24, 1906, the Buffalo and Lake Erie Traction Company took control of the Erie Electric Motor Company and completed its 92-mile (148 km) line to Buffalo, New York in 1909. When the Conneaut and Erie was abandoned on September 16, 1922, the West Ridge Transportation Company was started the next year to run buses along the abandoned trolley route. The Buffalo and Lake Erie was reorganized into the Buffalo and Erie Railway Company on September 5, 1924, and the streetcar system in Erie was split from the Buffalo and Erie to form the Erie Railways Company. Unable to expanded to invest in an expansion of the streetcar system, four Yellow Coach "Z"'s were acquired and were operated by the Erie Coach Company, a newly formed subsidiary of the Erie Railways Company in 1925. The last of its trolleys ran between Erie and New York on December 1, 1932. The streetcars were put out of service in 1935. The city and county took over the Erie Coach Company and formed the Erie Metropolitan Transit Authority on September 20, 1966.

The Erie Metropolitan Transit Authority renamed its bus service "the 'e'" on June 11, 2010.

== The 'e' ==
=== Routes ===
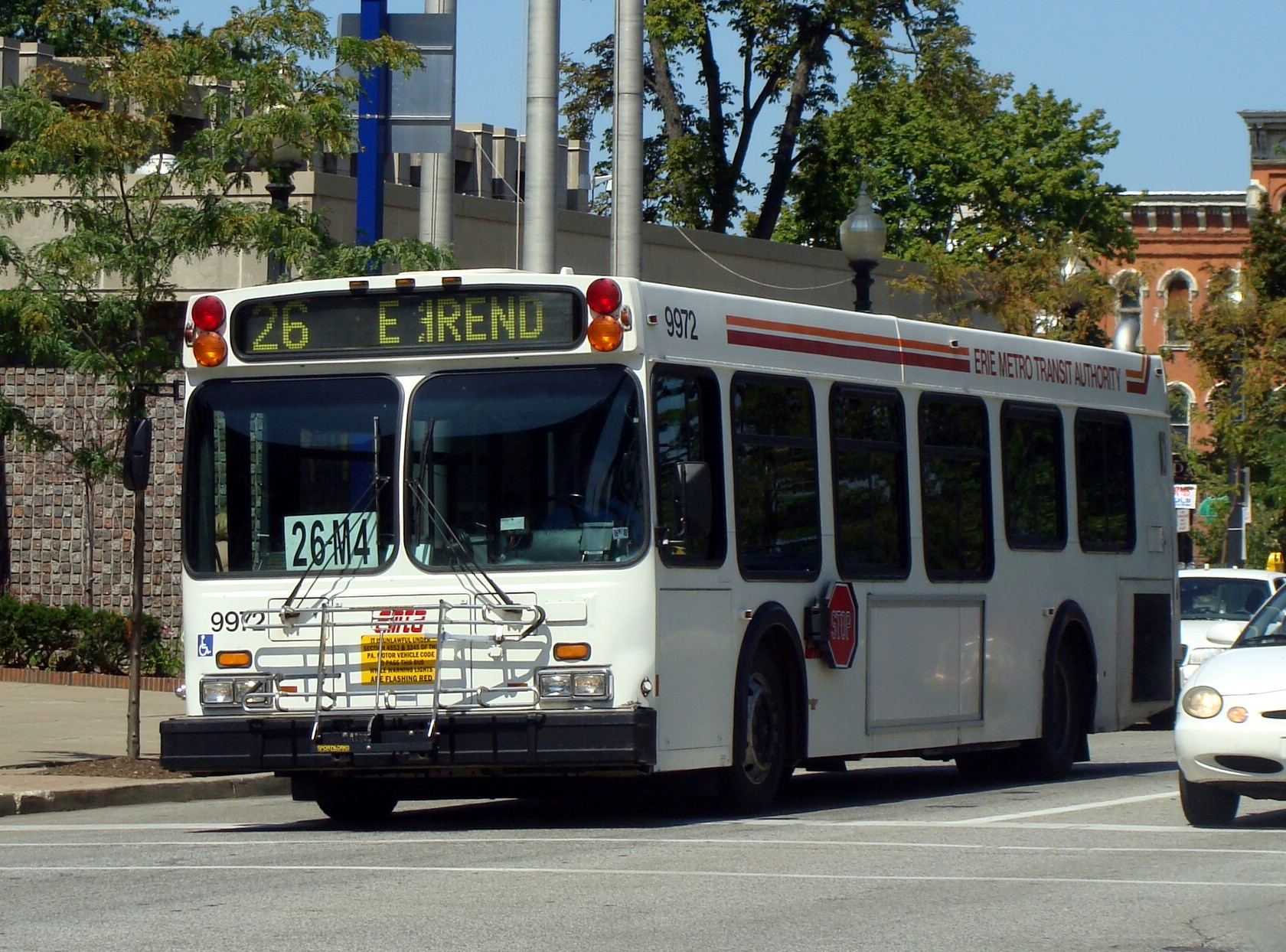
An EMTA New Flyer D35LF

Route	Weekday	Sat	Sun	Inbound terminus	Destinations served	Notes
1 Glenwood	No	Yes	No	7th-French Street	Glenwood - Millcreek Mall	Route only operates on Saturday. Weekday Service via alternating trips on Route 3.
3 Peach Street 3 Glenwood	Yes	Yes	No	Intermodal Center	Peach Street, Millcreek Mall, Summit, Target, Cinemark Theatre, Summit Towne Centre, Oliver Road, Baldwin Industrial Park, Erie County Vo-Tech, Peach Street Walmart	Alternating trips via Cherry St, Glenwood, Cherry Ext, South Hill Road, and Kuntz Road (Monday through Friday). These trips DO NOT service Peach Street between West 26th Street and Kuntz Road.
4 Liberty Street	Yes	No	No	Intermodal Center	Millcreek Mall	
11 Harborcreek	No (Wed, Fri only)	No	No	9th and Peach Streets	Harborcreek Township	
12 Albion	No (Mon, Thu only)	No	No	7th and French Streets	Millcreek Mall, Fairview, Girard, Lake City, Albion	Morning inbound service and Afternoon outbound service operates via Peach Street, Millcreek Mall and I-79 between West 26th Street and Championship Ford (West 26th St at Crescent).
14 Edinboro	Yes	Yes	No	7th and French Streets	Millcreek Mall, McKean, Edinboro, Edinboro University of Pennsylvania	
15 East 38th Street	No	Yes	No	Penn State Erie	Mercyhurst University, Millcreek Mall	
16 North East	Yes	Yes	No	7th and French Street	Mercyhurst University, Harborcreek Township, Mercyhurst North East, North East	
17 Briggs Avenue	No (Tue, Wed only)	Yes	No	Millcreek Mall	Mercyhurst University, Penn State Erie	
18 Penn State Behrend Campus Loop	Yes	No	No	—N/a	Penn State Erie	
19 Gannon Campus Loop	Yes	No	No	—N/a	Gannon University	
20A Downtown Loop	Yes	No	No	Intermodal Center	State Street (Downtown Erie)	
20B Lincoln Ave. - Park-N-Ride	Yes	No	No	UPMC Hamot	Lincoln Park-N-Ride	
20C Courthouse Loop	Yes	No	No	Intermodal Center	Erie County Courthouse	
20L Cultural Loop	No	Yes	No	Intermodal Center	Erie Art Museum, Erie Insurance Arena, Erie Playhouse, Warner Theater	
21 Lawrence Park	Yes	Yes	No	9th and Peach Streets	Perry Square, E. 6TH St, East Lake Road, Franklin Ave, Nagle Rd, Giant Eagle Plaza Lawrence Park	Most inbound 21 Lawrence Park trips upon arrival in Downtown Erie, convert into 28 Erie Heights trips outbound.
22 Tacoma	Yes	Yes	No	7th and French Streets	Tacoma Avenue	
23 Belle Valley	Yes	No	No	Intermodal Center	Belle Valley, Greene Township	
24 McClelland	Yes	No	No	7th and French Street	McClelland - 41st Rice Ave	
25 Wesleyville	Yes	Yes	No	7th and French Streets	Perry Square, E. 21st St, Buffalo Rd, Harbor Homes, Wesleyville, Giant Eagle PlazaWesleyville, Saltsman Road, Penn State Erie	Limited Service to Penn State. Most inbound 25 Wesleyville trips upon arrival in Downtown Erie, convert into 30 West Millcreek trips outbound.
26 E 26th ST	Yes	Yes	No	Intermodal Center	E 26th ST, Penn State Erie	
27 State	Yes	Yes	No	Intermodal Center	Presque Isle Downs	Evening Service bypasses VA Hospital.
28 Erie Heights	Yes	Yes	No	7th and French Street	Most inbound 28 Erie Heights trips upon arrival in Downtown Erie, convert into 21 Lawrence Park trips outbound.	
29 Asbury	Yes	Yes	No	Intermodal Center	West 26th Street, Asbury Road	Saturday Service to Walmart Only.
30 West Millcreek	Yes	Yes	No	7th and French Streets	Millcreek Township, Legion Road	Most inbound 30 West Millcreek trips upon arrival in Downtown Erie, convert into 25 Wesleyville trips outbound.
31 Frontier	Yes	Yes	No	7th and French Streets	Erie Int'l Airport - Fortis Inst., West 12th Street	Limited Service to Manchester Road and IMBC due to discontinuation of 32 Westlake.
105 Corry Loop	Yes	No	No	—N/a	Corry	Limited service provided to Downtown Erie, Peach Street, Millcreek Mall, Waterford, and Union City.
229 Fairview	Yes	No	No		Fairview	
Edinboro Express	Yes	Yes	No	—N/a	Edinboro University of Pennsylvania	

== Fleet ==
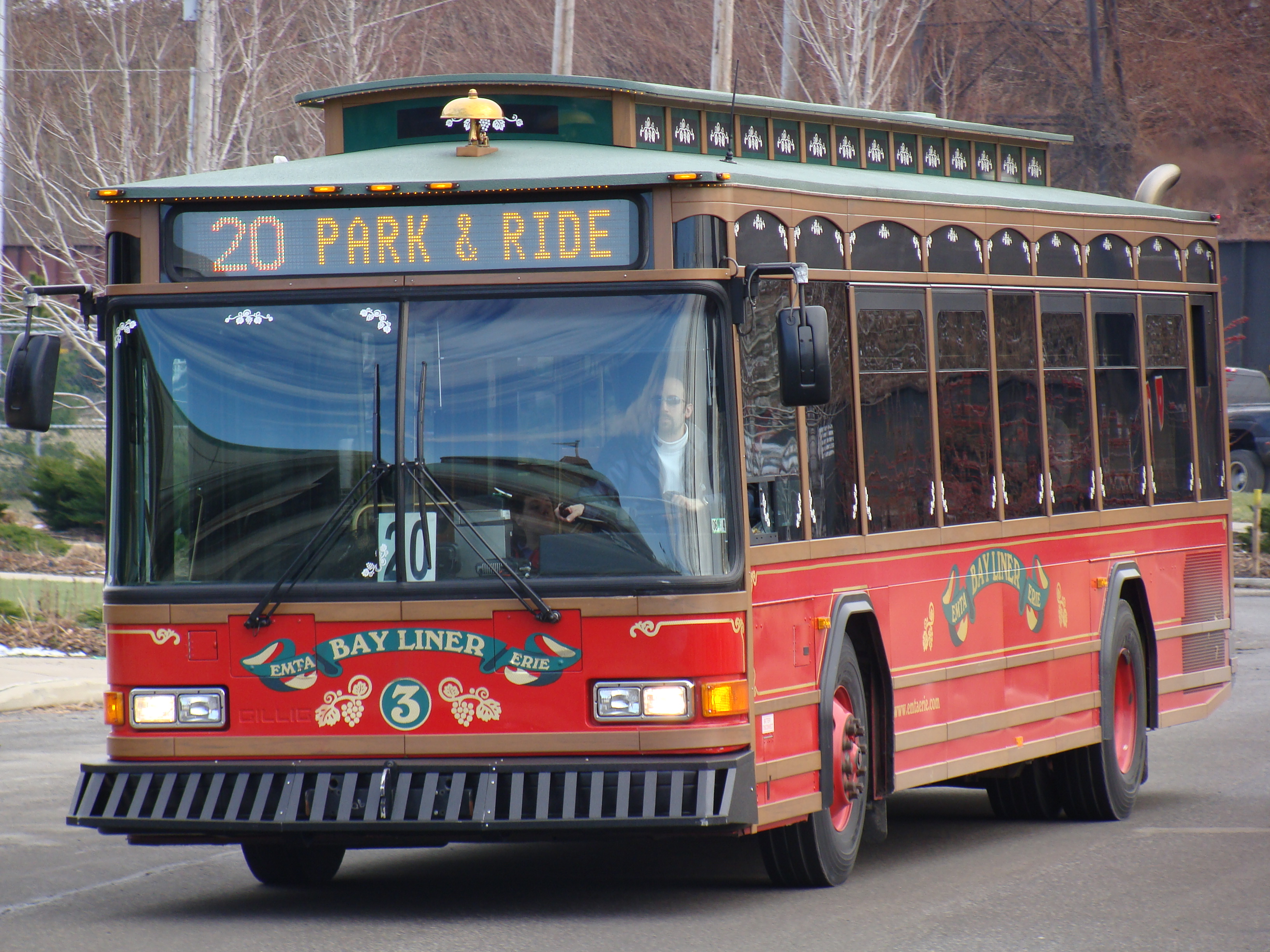
A Bayliner trolley-replica bus

Fleet numbers	Build date	Manufacturer	Model
7-10	2025	Gillig	Trolley Replica CNG 35'
1024-1029	2010	OBI	Orion VII NG (07.501)
1030-1033	2010	Gillig	Low Floor 35'
1034-1035	2010	Gillig	Low Floor 29'
1336-1337	2013	Gillig	Low Floor CNG 29'
1338-1342	2013	Gillig	Low Floor CNG 40'
1343-1347	2014	Gillig	Low Floor CNG 40'
1748-1752	2017	Gillig	Low Floor CNG 29'
1953-1955	2019	Gillig	Low Floor CNG 35'
2056-2064	2020	Gillig	Low Floor CNG 35'
2165-2172	2021	Gillig	Low Floor CNG 35'
2373-2374	2023	Gillig	Low Floor CNG 35'
2375-2378	2024	Gillig	Low Floor CNG 29'
2579-2582	2025	Gillig	Low Floor CNG 40'

== LIFT ==
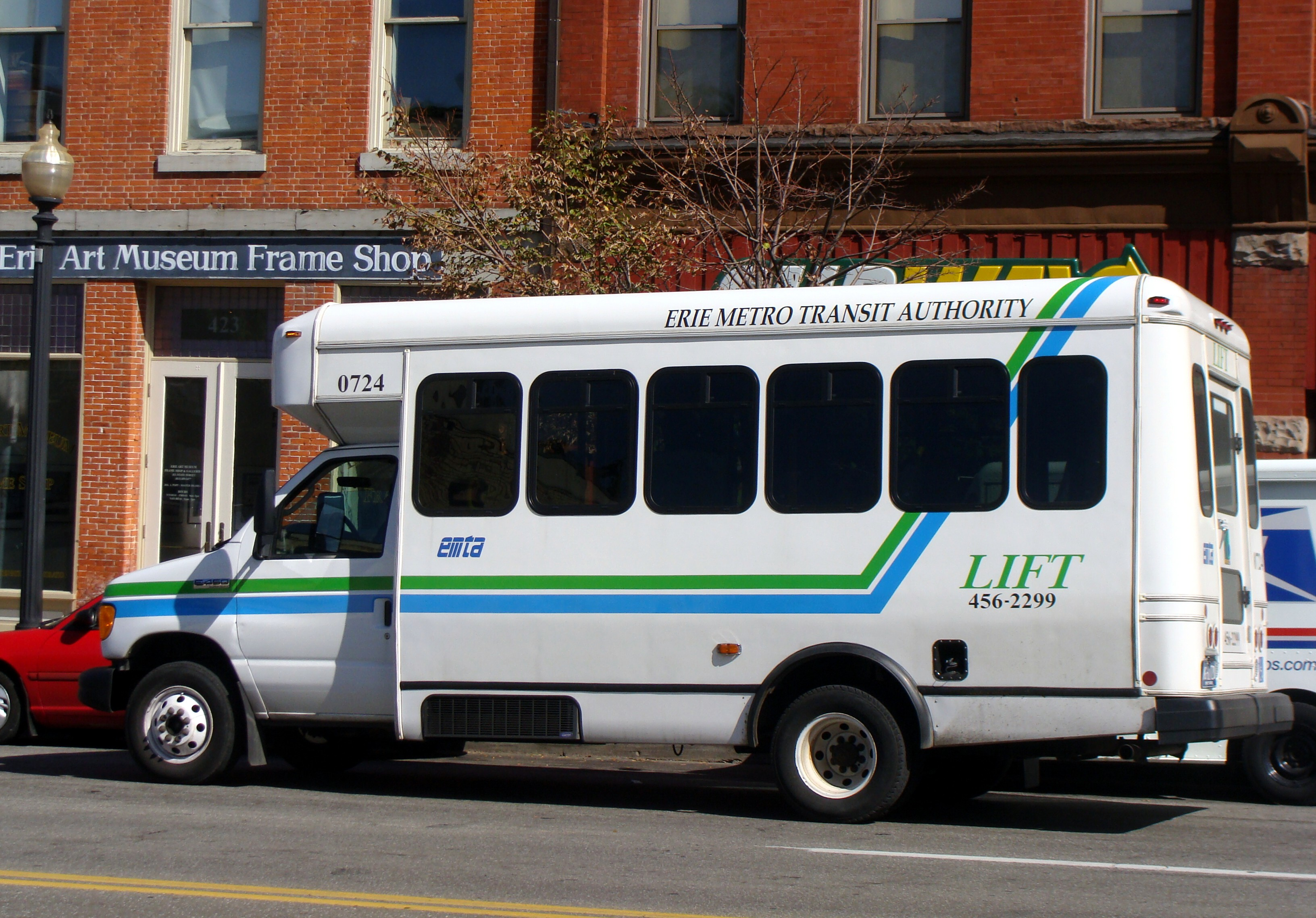
An EMTA Ford E-450 bus

"LIFT" is EMTA's paratransit program in that provides door-to-door transportation services to people who have physical disabilities, are senior citizens or anyone who lives "beyond the bus routes or are unable to utilize bus services." Some passengers qualify for free rides while others may have to pay a minimum of $1.65 to ride.

== Other programs ==
Until 2008, EMTA offered a "trackless" trolley that could be rented for special occasions; while the rental program has been discontinued, this type of vehicle is still used for Route 20. Another program from EMTA is their "Bike on the Bus" program for bicyclists that allows them to take the bus to a destination while carrying their bike on a rack on the front of the bus for free. EMTA has a "Bayliner Trolley" route, using trackless trolleys, that takes the place of the Park and ride service in Erie. Currently, there is no fare on the Bayliner route.

== See also ==
- Transportation in Erie, Pennsylvania
