= Millcreek Township School District =

School district in Pennsylvania

Coordinates: 42.0702°N 80.1638°W

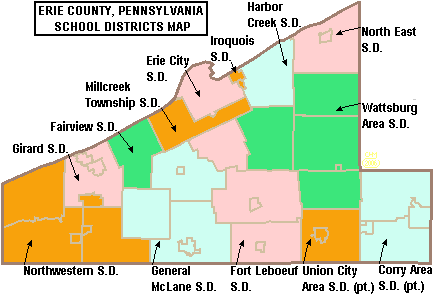

Location
- Millcreek Township, Pennsylvania Millcreek Township United States

District information
- Type: Public
- Motto: PRIDE! is one of our products
- Grades: K-12
- Established: 1805; 221 years ago
- Superintendent: Dr. John Cavanagh

Students and staff
- Students: 7,464
- Colors: Blue & White

Other information
- Website: mtsd.org

Millcreek Township School District is a school district serving Millcreek Township, a suburb of Erie, Pennsylvania. The total enrollment is 7,464 students. The district was the pilot district in the Start S.M.A.R.T. Program in 2002.

== Schools ==
The Millcreek Township School District is home to 10 schools.

=== Elementary schools ===
- Chestnut Hill Elementary
- Tracy Elementary
- Belle Valley Elementary School
- Asbury Elementary School
- Grandview Elementary School

=== Middle schools ===
- Walnut Creek Middle School
- James S. Wilson Middle School
- Westlake Middle School

==== Walnut Creek Middle School ====
From 2000-2002 students at the school worked with the Asbury Woods Nature Center in a project to assess the Walnut Creek watershed to help with public education and protection of the natural resource.

The development of the nature center's educational program was one of a number of environmental education projects undertaken by students the school's science classes. A class, calling itself "Walnut Creek S.E.W.E.R." (Saving Erie's Water & Environmental Resources), also worked on projects to educate their community "about cleaner water, including a billboard and brochures, such as Your Lawn & Pesticides: What Goes Around, Comes Around," according to The Carnegie Reporter. "They have also worked with local officials to increase street sweeping, which reduces runoff into the water." Asbury middle school

=== High schools ===
- McDowell High School
- McDowell Intermediate High School

=== Technical/ Alternative Education ===
- Millcreek Learning Center
- North Coast School
- Students in 10th Grade or above can take courses at [Erie County Technical School]
