= McDowell High School (Pennsylvania) =

Coordinates: 42.0728°N 80.1494°W

Location
- 3580 West 38th St; Millcreek, Pennsylvania; United States

Information
- Type: Public
- Motto: The Right Place For Every Kid
- Established: 1954
- Principal: Scott Quivey (since 2026)
- Teaching staff: 148.24 (on an FTE basis)
- Enrollment: 2,133 (2024–2025)
- Student to teacher ratio: 14.39
- Campus: Suburban
- Colors: Blue and White
- Website: mcd.mtsd.org

McDowell High School is a public high school located in Millcreek Township, Pennsylvania, a suburb of Erie. It is the only high school in the Millcreek Township School District. The school's mascot is the Trojan.

== Students ==
There are approximately 2,500 students attending McDowell High School. The McDowell campus consists of two buildings: McDowell Intermediate accommodating students in grades 9 and 10, and McDowell Senior accommodating grades 11 and 12. Students travel between these buildings on campus when attending classes.

== Enrollment ==
As of the 2024–25 school year:

Group	Number of students	Percent
All	2,133	100%
White	1,675	78.5%
Black	71	3.3%
Asian	126	5.9%
Hispanic	116	5.4%
Two or More Races	138	6.5%
American Indian/Alaskan Native	6	0.3%
Male	1098	51.5%
Female	1104	48.5%

== Renovations ==
The Millcreek Township School Board had been in talks since 2009 about renovations to the McDowell property. In December 2011, the school board announced four possible options for renovation, ranging in cost from $80 million to $100 million. The board decided to create a new practice field for football.

On July 31, 2012, by a vote of 8–1, the Millcreek Township School Board voted in favor of consolidating both McDowell Senior High and McDowell Intermediate at cost of $110 million. During the meeting, school board members voted 6–3 in favor of moving Gus Anderson Field (now called James Connor Field) to the east side of Caughey Road, despite major student complaints for air condition.

On February 7, 2013, the superintendent of Millcreek, Michael Golde, announced he was taking a medical leave and stepping down from his position. One week later, the school board announced plans for a new McDowell were being scaled back, due to the high cost of the building.

In late February and early March, it was revealed the school district was between $6 million and $9 million in debt. The final announced total was $8.8 million, as of April 12, 2013. Due to the budget shortfall, the Millcreek Township School District announced the closure of two elementary schools, which officially ended the McDowell renovation project.

In March 2014, the Millcreek School Board approved nearly $2.4 million for a renovation to the high school. There were renovations to the field, lockers and windows.

In 2024, a $37.5 million renovation project began that focused on updating the school’s infrastructure, with air conditioning, library and cafeteria, and classroom. Remodeling focused mainly on McDowell South. McDowell South also remodeled its old and unused auditorium into the new “McDowell Innovation Commons”.

In early 2026, Millcreek Township School District announced a $19.5 million renovation called the McDowell Athletic Complex (MAC) Project that seeks a total overhaul of McDowells athletic complex. It seeks to improve the student walkway between the two schools, upgrades to James Connor Field (previously called Gus Anderson Field but renamed to honor James Connor, a McDowell graduate) and the practice field.

== Campus Unification ==
In 2026, McDowell Senior High School and McDowell Intermediate High School unified into a single campus. Campus leadership now includes one principal, one associate principal, and four assistant principals. The change was driven by years of discussion, and also for better leadership, consistency, and policy making for the buildings. The change took effect in the 2026-2027 school year.

== Notable alumni ==
- Ryan Bizzarro, politician
- Dan Briggs, musician (Between the Buried and Me)
- Marc Brown, author of Arthur book series and television show
- James Conner, All-American college football player and current NFL running back for Arizona Cardinals
- Jim Corbett, former NFL player
- Cooper Cousins, college football offensive guard for the Penn State Nittany Lions
- Travis Dermott, professional ice hockey player for the Utah Mammoth
- Fernando Frye, College football player
- David Greenberger, artist
- William Kowalski, American-Canadian novelist and screenwriter
- Connor McDavid, center and team captain for NHL's Edmonton Oilers
- Pat Monahan, lead singer of Train
- Mark Nelson, chemist and inventor of the antibiotic Nuzyra
- Brian Stablein, former NFL receiver (Indianapolis Colts and Detroit Lions, 1994–2000)
- Jonathan Stark, television writer/producer "Cheers", "Ellen, "Drew Carey", "According to Jim". Actor "Fright Night", "House II, The Second Story", "Tales from the Crypt".
- Dylan Strome, NHL player for the Washington Capitals
- Chris Vrenna, musician (Tweaker, Nine Inch Nails, Marilyn Manson)
- Fluke Gawin Caskey, actor (Dark Blue Kiss, Not Me)
- Justin Shouse, former professional basketball player
