= Sommerheim Park Archaeological District =

Historic district in Pennsylvania, United States

- U.S. National Register of Historic Places
- U.S. Historic district
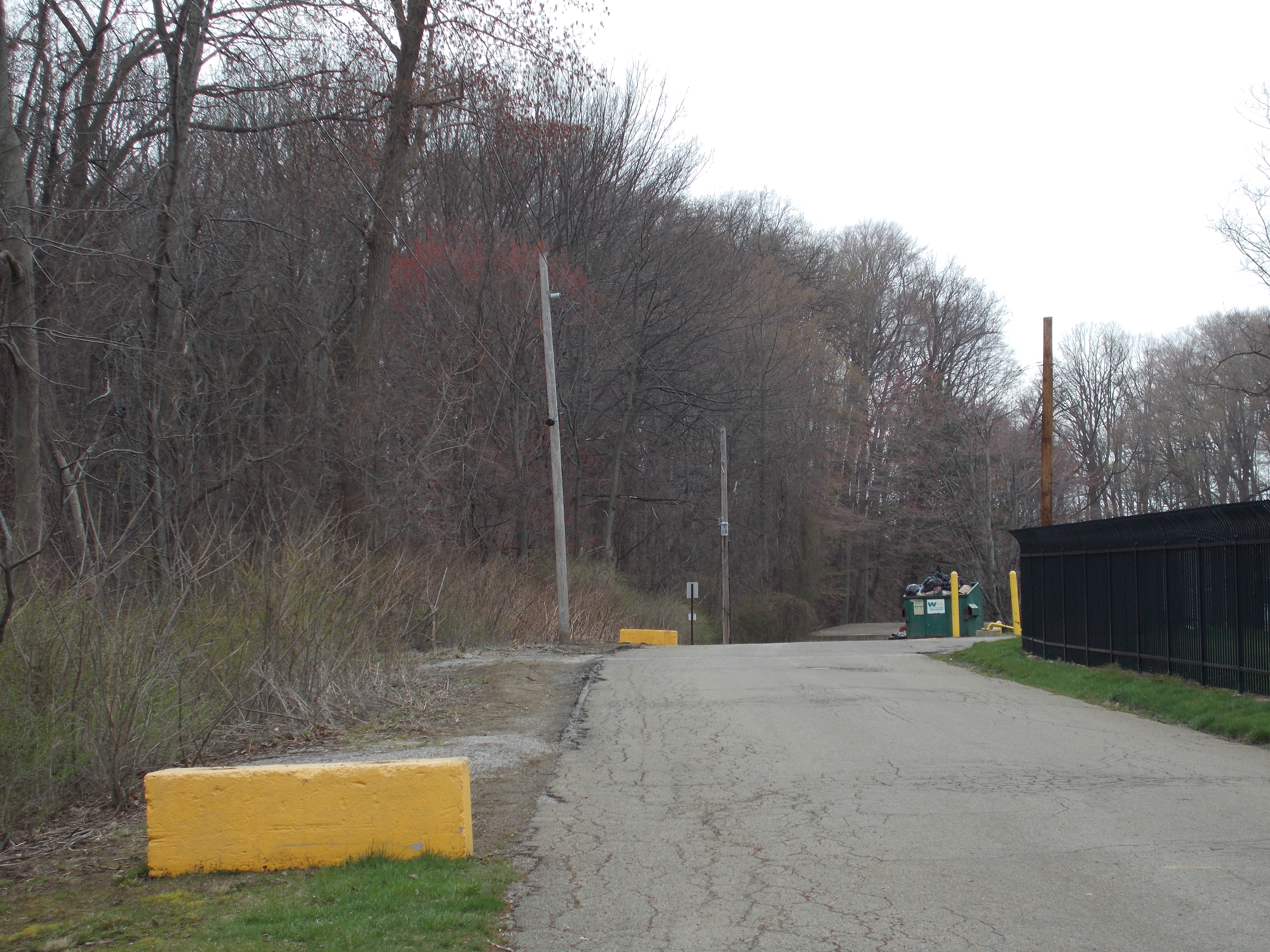
- Sommerheim Park Archaeological District, April 2013

- Location within Pennsylvania Location within the United States
- Location: On bluffs above Sommerheim Drive and Presque Isle Bay in Millcreek Township
- Nearest city: Erie, Pennsylvania
- Coordinates: 42°6′49″N 80°8′42″W
- Area: 44 acres (18 ha)
- NRHP reference No.: 86000397
- Added to NRHP: March 6, 1986

The Sommerheim Park Archaeological District includes a group of six archaeological sites west of Erie, Pennsylvania in the United States. The sites are in Sommerheim Park, one of the few undeveloped areas of the Lake Erie shoreline, in Millcreek Township. This district has been listed on the National Register of Historic Places. This is one of the leading archaeological sites in the Erie area and along the southern shoreline of Lake Erie, due to the amount of artifacts and the lack of disturbance on the site.

== Discoveries ==
Excavations revealed artifacts across a wide area of the park, including in the north where there are former farmlands and in dense woods along the park's eastern edge. The artifacts uncovered represent a wide range of archaeological cultures. Digs at six sites have found evidence from the entire Archaic period (roughly 8,000BCE to 1,000BCE) and the Early and Middle Woodland period (roughly 1,000BCE to 500CE). Artifacts include an especially dense concentration of Late Archaic remnants as well as a nineteenth-century dump created after European settlement. Various stone tools and evidence of Late Archaic houses have been found, indicating that the area may have been occupied seasonally by a fishing and hunting people.

Although the findings have been largely limited to the tops of the area's bluffs, scholars believe that the edges of the bluffs may yield evidence of prehistoric cemeteries. The district is significant because few seasonal campsites from before the Late Woodland period have been discovered along Lake Erie.

== Excavation ==
Local archaeologist C. Frederick Sanford's discovery of Plano points in Sommerheim Park in 1975 led to the first recognition of the area as a possible archaeological site. Students at Erie's Gannon University investigated the park under the leadership of a university archaeologist in the summer of that year, beginning a program of annual field schools that continued through the rest of the 1970s. These excavations yielded little evidence of disturbance at the sites, adding to their significance. While some parts of the bluffs had been cultivated after European settlement of the area, the damage was limited to the shallow upper layers of earth that could be cultivated with horse-drawn plows. The district's location on a lake bluff is likely to be the reason that it has survived; many similar sites likely once existed along nearby beaches and ridges, but they have likely been destroyed by the expansion of Erie and its suburbs and by quarrying for sand and gravel.

== Preservation ==
Well-preserved Native American archaeological sites are a rarity in the Lake Erie plain. The amount of information found at the Sommerheim Park sites makes them one of the leading archaeological sites in the Erie area and the southern shoreline of Lake Erie. In recognition of their significance, the sites were designated a historic district and listed on the National Register of Historic Places in 1986. No other Native American village sites northwest of Pittsburgh are listed on the Register, and the only other prehistoric site on the Register in northwestern Pennsylvania is Indian God Rock, a petroglyph in Venango County.

== See also ==
- List of European archaeological sites on the National Register of Historic Places in Pennsylvania
- List of Native American archaeological sites on the National Register of Historic Places in Pennsylvania
