= Millcreek Mall =

Shopping mall in Erie, Pennsylvania

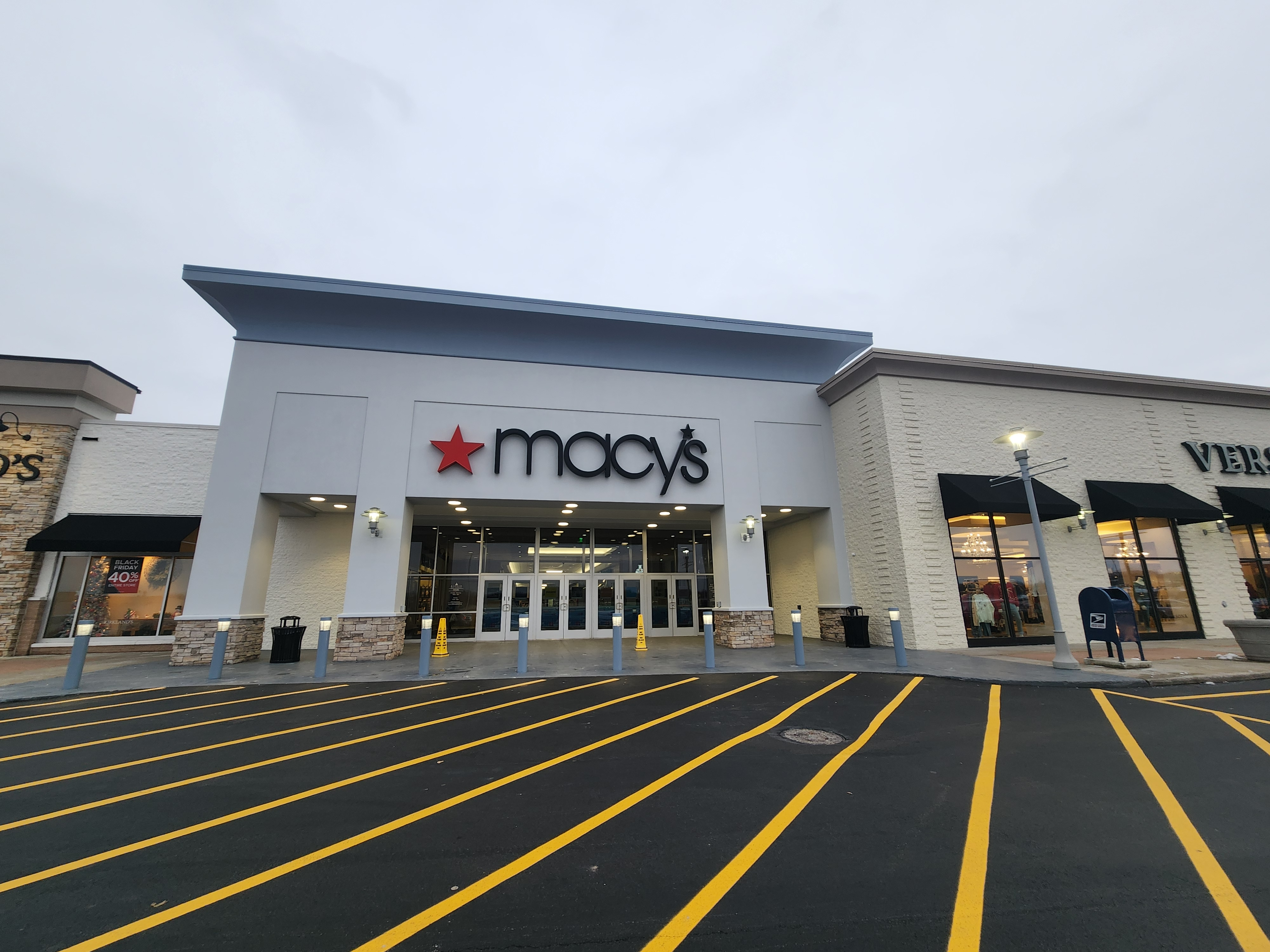
- Millcreek Mall in 2025
- Location: Millcreek, Pennsylvania, United States
- Coordinates: 42°4′9.43″N 80°5′56.52″W
- Opened: November 10, 1975
- Manager: Cafaro Company
- Owner: Cafaro Company
- Num. of stores: 104
- Num. of anchor tenants: 6 (5 open, 1 seasonal tenant)
- Floor area: 2,200,000 square feet (200,000 m^{2})
- Floors: 1 (2 in Boscov's, JCPenney, Macy's, Round One Entertainment)
- Public transit: EMTA bus: 1, 3, 4, 14, 15, 17, 105
- Website: www.millcreekmall.net

The Millcreek Mall or Millcreek Mall Complex is a one-level shopping center 3.4 miles (5.5 km) southwest of downtown Erie, Pennsylvania, between Peach Street and Interstate 79, in Millcreek Township.

The complex opened on November 10, 1975 and was developed by the Youngstown, Ohio-based Cafaro Company, who continue to own and operate it. Due to Pennsylvania's lack of sales tax on clothing, the Millcreek Mall attracts many visitors from Ohio, New York and Canada. The mall proper houses 104 store spaces, with 12 kiosks. The 165 stores and restaurants figure often cited includes stores within the physical mall and its many peripheral restaurants, stores and strip plazas. The mall is anchored by Boscov's, JCPenney, Round One, Macy's and Dick's Sporting Goods.

== History ==
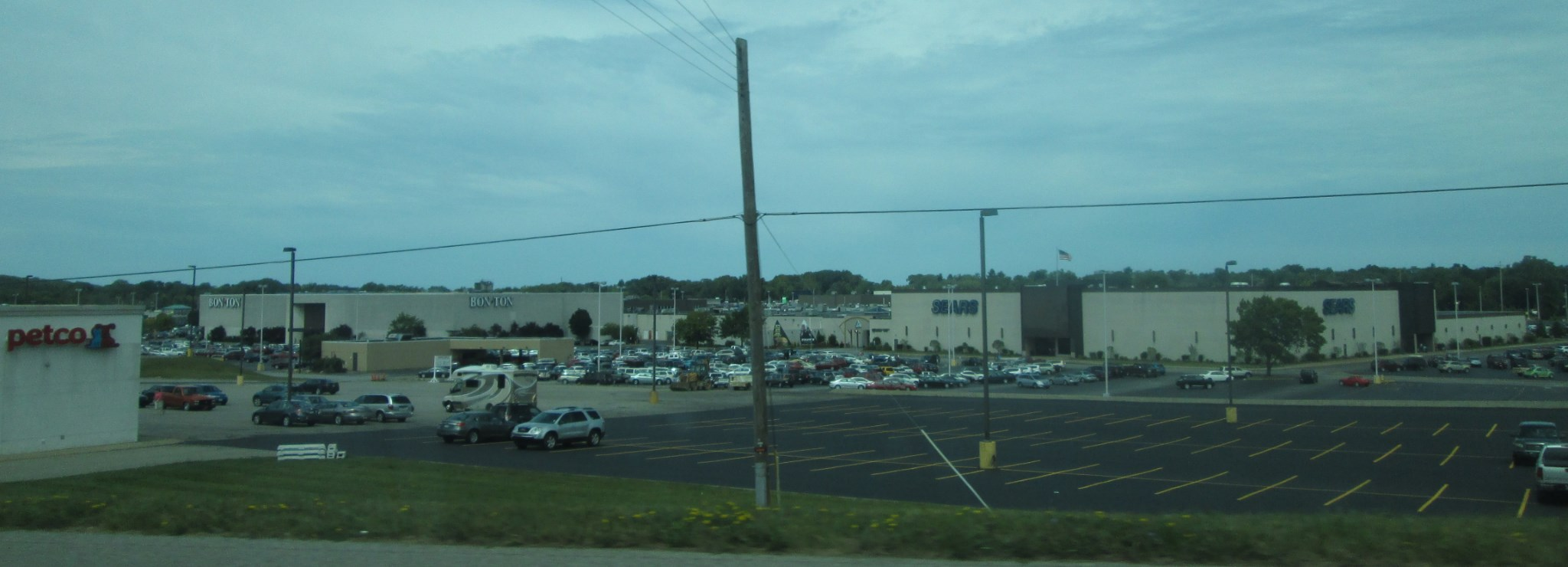
Exterior view of the mall, 2014

The mall's original anchor stores included Boston Store, Halle's, JCPenney, Kaufmann's, Carlisle's and Sears. Boston Store in 1979 became Horne's, which in turn closed and became Lazarus in 1994. Lazarus closed this anchor in 1997. Halle's later became a Dahlkemper's catalog showroom, which closed in 1993. Its space became Burlington Coat Factory. HomePlace took the former Carlisle's location after Carlisle's closure in 1995. Elder-Beerman took over the former Lazarus in 1998, but was converted five years later to The Bon-Ton. After HomePlace closed, its space was divided between Steve & Barry's and AC Moore; the former closed in 2009 and the latter in 2020. Also, Kaufmann's was converted to Macy's in September 2006. Burlington Coat Factory moved out of the mall in late 2012. In 2014, the space that was occupied by Burlington was split into six spaces that now house Primanti Brothers, a Mad Mex restaurant, a Round One Entertainment arcade and a Guitar Center. The two other spaces are still vacant as of now with no future plans but the spaces are used seasonally by some companies. The area of the mall was also renamed "The Promenade" with an entrance of its own.

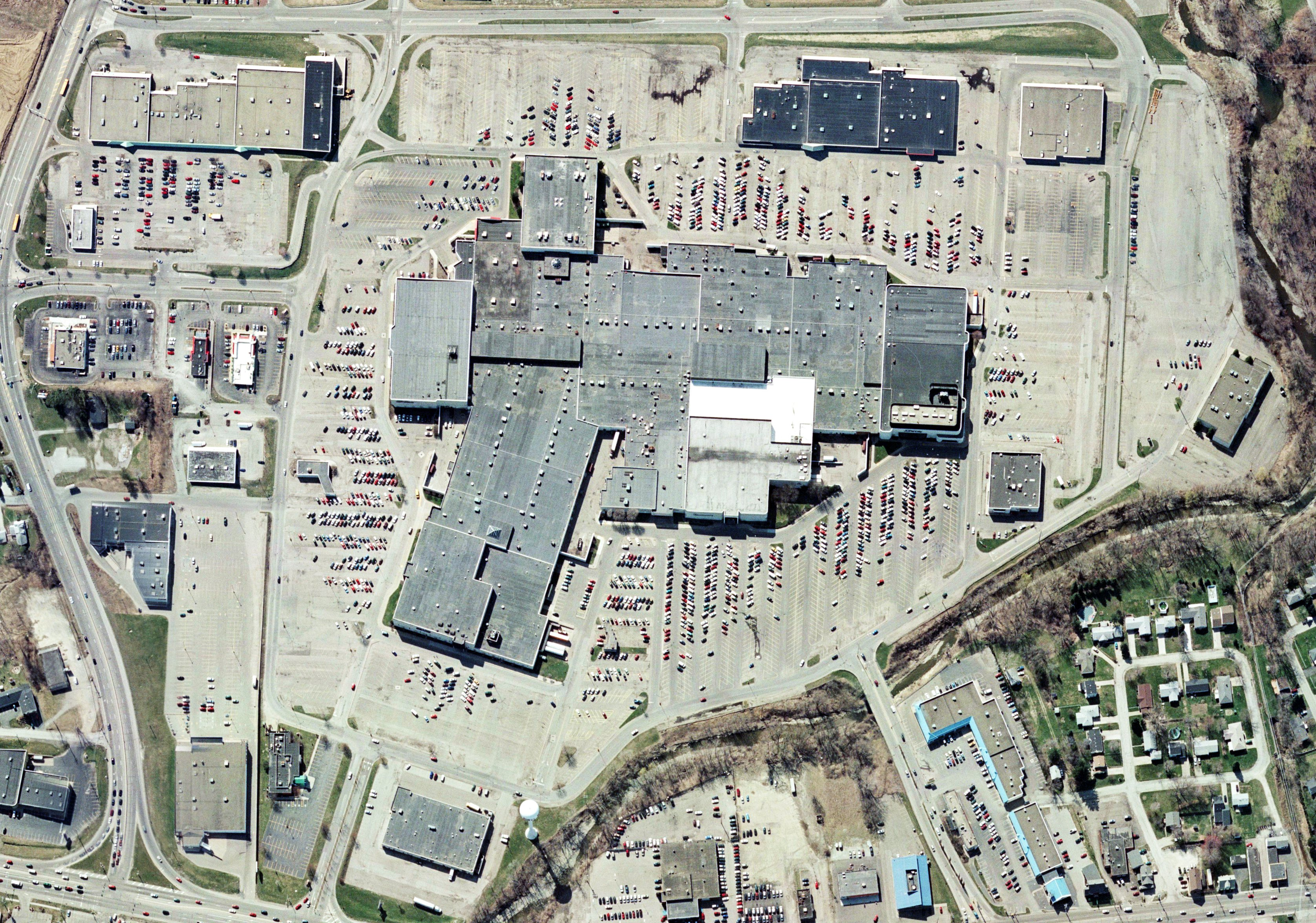
Aerial photo of the mall

The combination of anchors has given it the shape of a gun pointed at downtown Erie when viewed from above, which has led to controversy in some cases. This has resulted in an urban legend which states the mall was intentionally built that way under the direction of the mafia.

On March 27, 2008, it was announced the mall would receive a multimillion-dollar renovation. Among the new additions to the mall are a children's area, a food court, and renovated entrances to the building. The mall also got skylights, porcelain floors, a new west side entrance, and new parking lot lights. The food court opened in late 2008.

Boscov's opened in the recently shuttered Sears on October 5, 2017.

On October 18, 2017, it was announced Round One Entertainment will join the center. It opened in Summer 2018.

On January 31, 2018, it was announced that regional division The Bon-Ton will be closing this location.

In February 2023, it was announced that Dick's Sporting Goods will be moving from its prior location in the Millcreek Mall Pavilion into the space formerly occupied by The Bon-Ton.

On November 9, 2024, Sierra, a department store known for selling outdoor sports apparel and gear opened next to Boscov’s.

== Outparcels ==
The Millcreek Mall Pavilion consists of stores, restaurants, and hotels. The former Blair store, originally a Children's Palace toy store, has been converted into the Erie Institute of Technology (EIT). Also on the property is the former Cinema 6, a discount movie theater, which is now the Elevate! church. Giant Eagle opened a supermarket on the property on March 23, 2017.

== In popular media ==
On the children's television series Arthur, the mall in Elwood City is based on Millcreek Mall and stylized as "Mill Creek Mall".

== See also ==
- Peach Street
- List of largest shopping malls in the United States
