= Millcreek Township, Erie County, Pennsylvania =

Township in Pennsylvania, US

Coordinates: 42°09′00″N 80°05′59″W

Millcreek Township
- Township
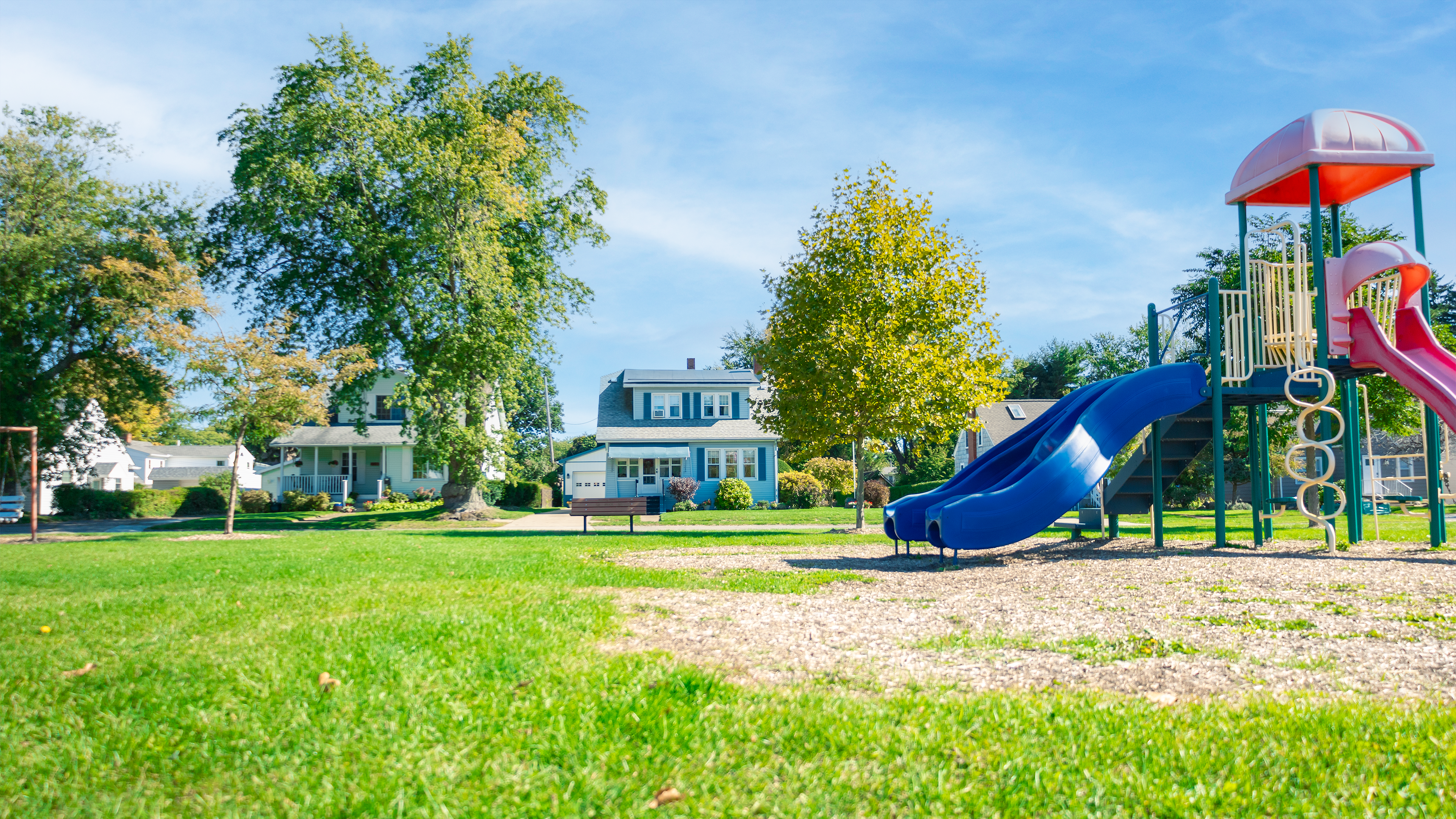
- Millcreek Township's Lakewood Park

- Seal Logo
- Etymology: Mill Creek
- Motto: "Gateway to Presque Isle"
- Location in Erie County and the state of Pennsylvania
- Country: United States of America
- State: Pennsylvania
- County: Erie

Area
  - Total: 32.79 sq mi (84.93 km^{2})
  - Land: 32.02 sq mi (82.93 km^{2})
  - Water: 0.78 sq mi (2.01 km^{2})
- Highest elevation (near Belleview Heights): 1,170 ft (360 m)
- Lowest elevation (Lake Erie): 572 ft (174 m)

Population (2020)
  - Total: 54,070
  - Estimate (2023): 53,101
  - Density: 1,600/sq mi (630/km^{2})
- Time zone: UTC-5 (EST)
  - Summer (DST): UTC-4 (EDT)
- Area code: 814
- FIPS code: 42-049-49548
- Website: www.millcreektownship.com

Millcreek Township is a township in Erie County, Pennsylvania, United States. The population was 54,070 at the 2020 census, making it the 14th-largest municipality in the state and the largest township in Western Pennsylvania.

Millcreek Township is home to the entrance to Presque Isle State Park, Waldameer & Water World, Millcreek Mall, and other attractions. Also located in the township is Erie International Airport, the primary airport serving the Erie metropolitan area. LECOM Health, a non-profit healthcare system serving Erie County and the surrounding areas, also calls the township home.

== History ==
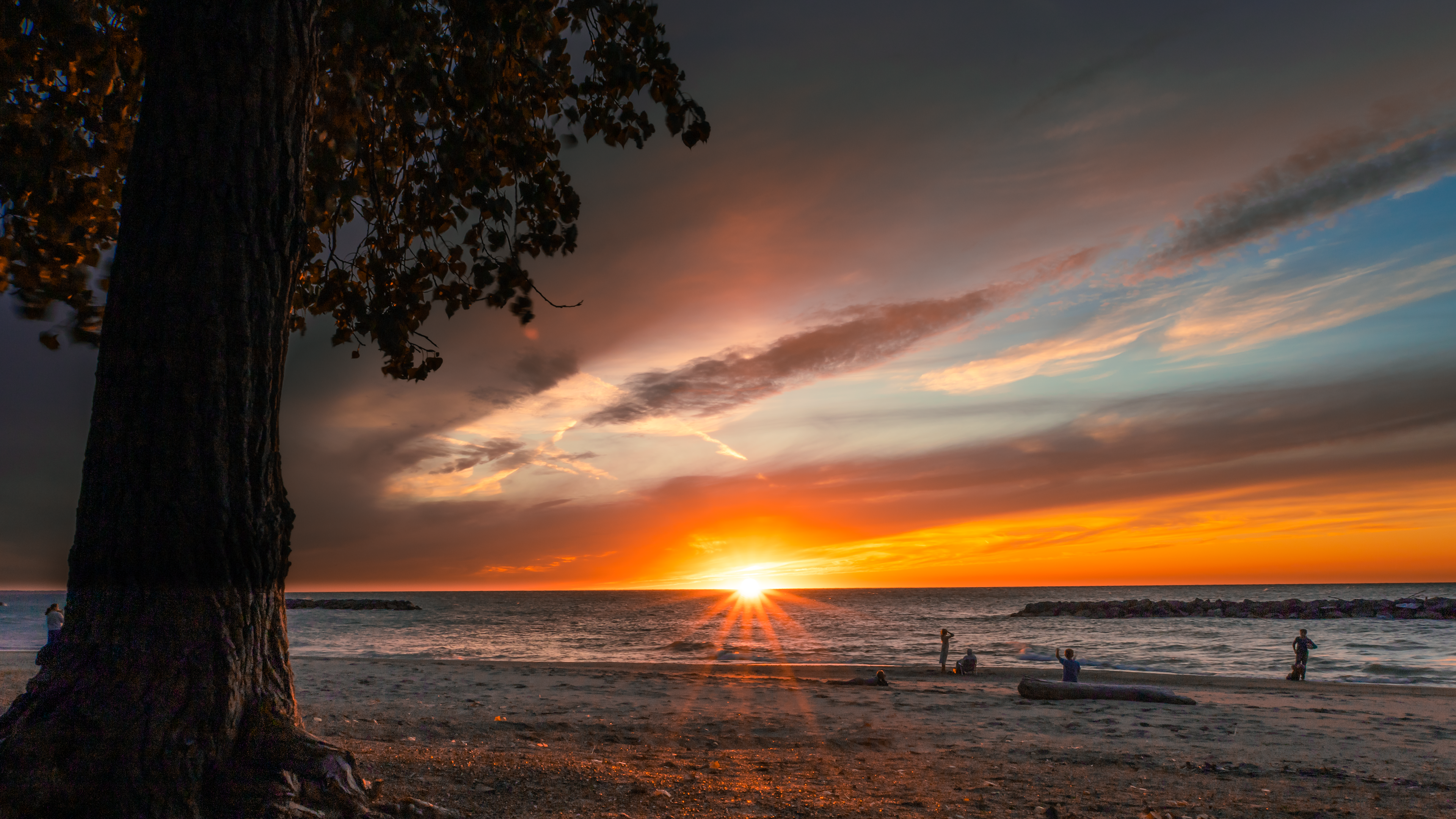
Presque Isle State Park in Millcreek Township

Evidence exists of Native American presence in Millcreek Township as early as 3700 BC. The township's Sommerheim Park is the location of the Sommerheim Park Archaeological District, which has yielded archaeological artifacts from the Archaic and Woodland periods.

Millcreek, one of the original 16 townships of Erie County, was among the first areas settled in the Erie Triangle. As new families arrived, they moved inland from the bayfront settlement of Erie. They established small hamlets such as Federal Hill, Kearsarge, Marvintown, and Weigelville—all of which later became part of Millcreek Township. As Erie expanded, first becoming a borough and then a city, it gradually annexed increasing portions of the township.

After surveyors laid out the east–west roads, tavern owners began establishing inns roughly every mile. In 1805, workers extended Ridge Road—now part of U.S. Route 20—westward through Millcreek, prompting a rise in such establishments. One tavern that still stands is the Nicholson Tavern, which Isabella Nicholson and her sons constructed in 1836. The Nicholson family continues to own the property, which appears on the National Register of Historic Places. Other Millcreek sites on the National Register include the Presque Isle Light and the Sommerheim Park Archaeological District.

A recurving sandspit peninsula, Presque Isle, connects to the mainland in western Millcreek. During the War of 1812, Oliver Hazard Perry commanded his fleet in battle and strategically used the peninsula's bay as a harbor to construct six out of nine of the ships in his fleet. In 1921, the peninsula was designated a state park and later became a National Natural Landmark by the National Park Service. Today, the park serves as a bird sanctuary, home to over 150 different species.

Just west of the entry into Presque Isle was a well-forested area known as Hopkins Grove. The Erie Electric Motor Company purchased the grove in 1896 for development into an amusement park called Waldameer. Waldameer is one of the oldest amusement parks in the nation, and has since been expanded to include a water park known as Water World.

== Geography ==
According to the U.S. Census Bureau, the township has a total area of 32.8 square miles (84.9 km^{2}), of which 32.1 square miles (83.1 km^{2}) is land and 0.73 square miles (1.9 km^{2}), or 2.20%, is water.

Today, Millcreek dedicates its land to retail, commercial, and service-oriented businesses, as well as light industry, public and private schools, and residential neighborhoods. Only about 1% of the land remains zoned for agriculture. Within the township's borders, Edinboro University operates Porreco College, and the community maintains recreational spaces such as Zuck Park, the Erie Golf Course, and the Asbury Woods Nature Center and Recreation Center.

== Demographics ==
Historical population
| Census | Pop. | Note | %± |
|---|---|---|---|
| 1950 | 16,776 | | — |
| 1960 | 28,239 | | 68.3% |
| 1970 | 36,946 | | 30.8% |
| 1980 | 44,303 | | 19.9% |
| 1990 | 46,820 | | 5.7% |
| 2000 | 52,129 | | 11.3% |
| 2010 | 53,515 | | 2.7% |
| 2020 | 54,070 | | 1.0% |
| 2024 (est.) | 53,059 | | −1.9% |
U.S. Decennial Census

At the 2000 census, there were 52,129 people, 21,217 households, and 14,088 families living in the township. The population density was 1,768.5 inhabitants per square mile (682.8/km^{2}). There were 22,369 housing units at an average density of 758.9 per square mile (293.0/km^{2}). The racial makeup of the township was 96.55% White, 1.09% African American, 0.09% Native American, 1.34% Asian, 0.01% Pacific Islander, 0.30% from other races, and 0.62% from two or more races. Hispanic or Latino of any race were 0.99%.

Millcreek contained 21,217 households. Of these, 30.2% included children under the age of 18, and 55.0% consisted of married couples living together. Female householders with no husband present accounted for 8.4%, while non-family households made up 33.6%. Individuals living alone comprised 29.0% of all households, and 11.7% were individuals aged 65 or older. The average household size was 2.42, and the average family size was 3.01.

The age distribution was as follows: 24.1%were under the age of 18, 7.2%were from 18 to 24, 27.4%were from 25 to 44, 25.2%were from 45 to 64, and 16.1%were 65 or older. The median age was 40 years. For every 100 females, there were 93.2 males. Or every 100 females age 18 and over, there were 89.6 males.

The median household income was $45,019, and the median family income was $56,341. Males had a median income of $41,868 versus $26,610 for females. The per capita income for the township was $24,279. About 3.9% of families and 5.8% of the population were below the poverty line, including 7.0% of those under age 18 and 4.8% of those age 65 or over.

== Education ==
The Millcreek Township School District serves Millcreek Township. Since July 2023, Dr. John Cavanagh has led the district as superintendent.

Elementary Schools

- Asbury Elementary School
- Belle Valley Elementary School
- Chestnut Hill Elementary School
- Grandview Elementary School
- Tracy Elementary School

Middle Schools

- James S. Wilson Middle School
- Walnut Creek Middle School
- Westlake Middle School

High Schools

- McDowell High School

== Notable people ==
- David B. McCreary (1826–1906), Pennsylvania state legislator
