= Bibliography of the United States Constitution =

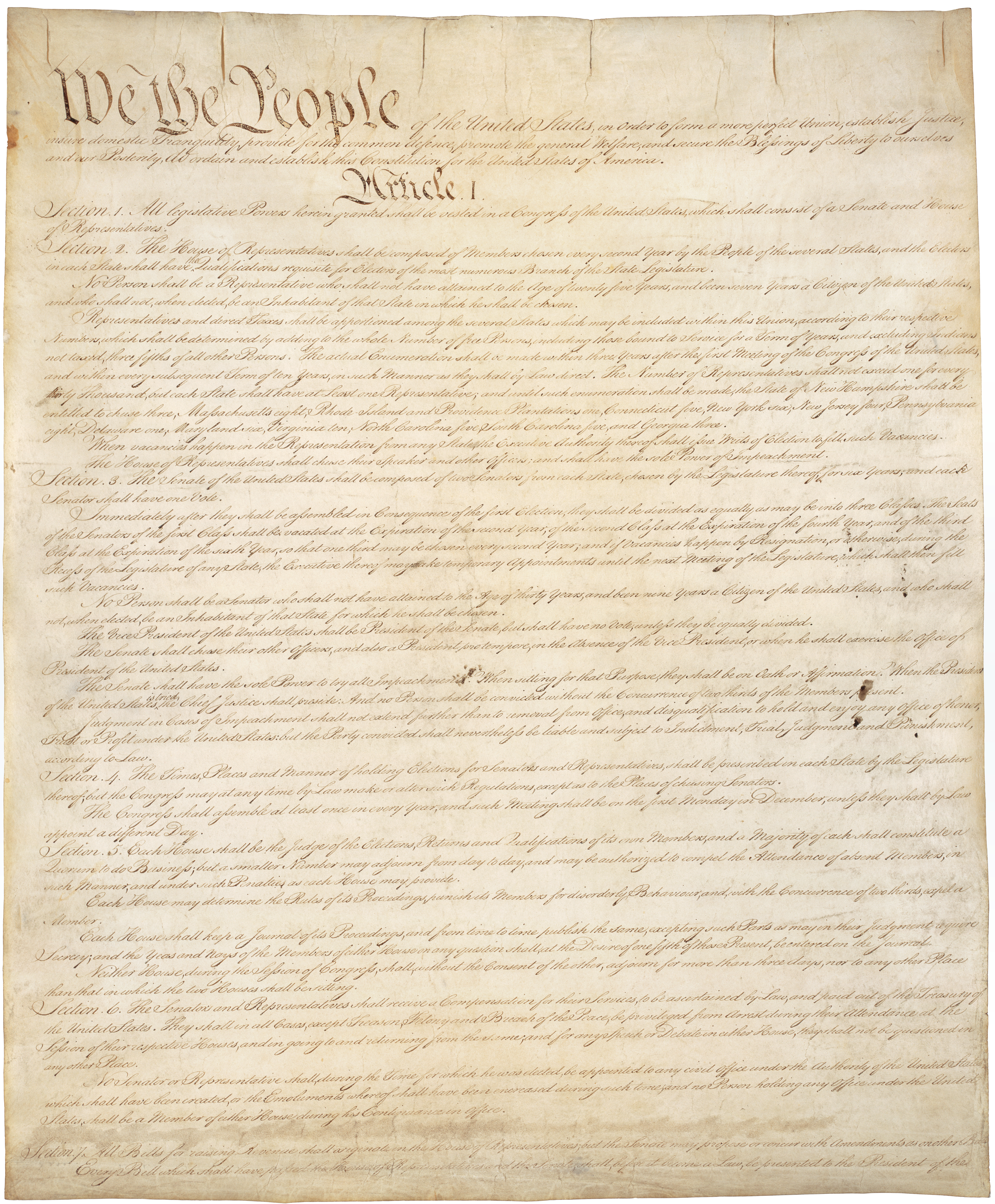
Constitution of the United States Created: September 17, 1787 Presented: September 28, 1787 Ratified: June 21, 1788 Date effective: March 4, 1789

The Bibliography of the United States Constitution is a comprehensive selection of books, journal articles and various primary sources about and primarily related to the Constitution of the United States that have been published since its ratification in 1788. Many of the delegates at the Constitutional Convention set out to improve on the inadequate Articles of Confederation, but after much deliberation over state's rights a new Federal Constitution was approved. To allow delegates to make compromises and changes without speculation from the public and newspapers it was decided that the debates and drafting during the Convention be conducted in secret, which is why definitive accounts of the Convention did not appear until 1840, (Note: Because the delegates faithfully observed the secrecy agreement, no records of the Convention were released to the public until 1819, when the U.S. Congress finally moved for their publication. The notes in their entirety were not made public until 1840.) while many books on the Constitution begin after the Convention of 1787. On September 17, 1787, the new Constitution was signed by the delegates, and ratified the following year, which established the government of the United States in March 1789. Since then, many historians and political scientists, some of them critical and controversial, have written about the Constitution, and the Founding Fathers who framed it.

== Preliminary notes ==
- Books published before 1970 have no ISBN.
- Historical journals have no ISBN and usually possess a DOI number.
- Various works have been reprinted – any year dates enclosed in [brackets] denote the original year of publication
- Primary sources are works authored by individuals closely associated with the event or idea in question and are listed separately in the Primary sources section. (Note: Primary sources can include diaries, letters, log books, official documents, pamphlets, and books.)
- Many general biographies of James Madison, often considered the Father of the Constitution, exist, which cover his involvement with that document to one extent or another. Such works can be found in the Bibliography of James Madison article and are not included in this bibliography.
- Encyclopedia articles and essays found on web pages are not listed here.

Terms commonly found in titles of works
• Amendment • Anti-Federalist • Articles of Confederation • Bill of Rights • Church and State • Congress • Constitution • Constitutional Convention • Constitutional law • Continental Congress • Debates • Enlightenment • Federalist • Federal Convention • Federalist Papers • Freedom of Speech • Freedom of the Press • Ratification • Religious Freedom • Republic • Separation of powers • Supreme Court • We The People •

== 18th century publications ==
- Constitution related works authored in the eighteenth century are typically Primary sources and are listed in the Primary sources section.
- Works of this era that were highly influential to the Founders are listed in the Works influential to the Founders section

== 19th century publications ==
- Ames, Herman Vandenburg (1897). The proposed amendments to the Constitution of the United States during the first century of its history. Vol. II. Washington D.C.: Government Printing Office. (Note: At its Washington meeting, December 26, 27, 1895, the executive council of the American Historical Association voted to offer a prize of $100 for the best monograph, based upon original investigation in history, submitted to the council in the course of the year 1896. The committee of award, Profs. A. C. McLaughlin, of the University of Michigan; Moses Coit Tyler, of Cornell University, and James Harvey Robinson, of Columbia University, gave the prize (the Justin Winsor Prize) to Professor Herman Vandenburg Ames, of Ohio State University, for his elaborate monograph on "The proposed amendments to the Constitution of the United States during the first century of its history.)
- Bancroft, George (1882). History of the formation of the Constitution of the United States of America. Vol. I. New York, D. Appleton and company.
- —— (1882). History of the formation of the Constitution of the United States of America. Vol. II. New York, D. Appleton and company.
- Bayard, James (1833). A brief exposition of the Constitution of the United States: with an appendix, containing the Declaration of independence and the Articles of confederation. And a copius index. Philadelphia: Hogan & Thompson.
- Belisle, David W.; Lincoln, Abraham (1859). History of Independence Hall: from the earliest period to the present time, embracing biographies of the immortal signers of the Declaration of Independence, with historical sketches of the sacred relics preserved in that sanctuary of American freedom. Philadelphia: J. Challen & Son.
- Bowditch, William Ingersoll (1855). The United States Constitution. New York: American Anti-Slavery Society.
- Bryce, James (1893). The American Commonwealth. Vol. 1 (2nd ed.). London: Macmillan and Co.
- —— (1899) [1894]. The American Commonwealth. Vol. 2 (5th ed.). London: Macmillan and Co.
- Burgess, John William (1890). Political science and comparative constitutional law. Vol. I. Boston and London: Ginn & Co.
- —— (1890). Political science and comparative constitutional law. Vol. II. Boston and London: Ginn & Co.
- Clark, George Washington (1860). On the Constitution. Rochester, New York: Published in Rochester, New York.
- Cooley, Thomas McIntyre (1874). A treatise on the Constitutional limitations which rest upon the legislative power of the states of the American union. Boston, Little, Brown, and Company.
- —— (1880). The general principles of constitutional law in the United States of America. Boston: Little, Brown.
- —— (1889). Constitutional history of the United States: as seen in the development of American law. New York: G. P. Putnam's Sons.
- Craven, Elijah Richardson (1868). Religious Defect of the Constitution of the United States. Philadelphia: Christian Statesman. OCLC 5664903. At the Library of Congress.
- Curtis, George Ticknor (1861). History of the origin, formation, and adoption of the Constitution of the United States. Vol. I. New York: Harper and Brothers.
- —— (1861). History of the origin, formation, and adoption of the Constitution of the United States. Vol. II. New York: Harper and Brothers.
- Dicey, Albert Venn (1897) [1885]. Introduction To The Study Of The Law Of The Constitution. Ed. 5th. K. C. S. Wade. (Reprinted 1941, 1945, 1948, 1950, 1952, 1956)
- Farrar, Timothy (1867). Manual of the Constitution of the United States of America. Boston, Little, Brown and company.
- Fisher, Sydney George (1897). The Evolution of the Constitution of the United States. Philadelphia: J. B. Lippincott Company.
- Fiske, John (1898) [1888]. The Critical Period of American History. Cambridge, Mass.: The Riverside Press. (Reprinted in 1888, 1890, 1897, 1898, 1899, 1902, 1916)
- Johnston, Alexander (1882). History of American Politics (2nd revised and enlarged ed.). New York: Henry Holt and Company. ISBN 978-0-72227-5306.
- Ford, Paul Leicester, ed. (1888). Pamphlets on the Constitution of the United States, Published During its Discussion by the People, 1787–1788. Brooklyn, NY: [publisher not identified].
- ——; Sullivan, James; Winthrop, James (1892). Essays on the Constitution of the United States. Brooklyn, NY: Historical Printing Club.
- Harding, Samuel Bannister (1896). The contest over the ratification of the Federal Constitution in the State of Massachusetts. New York: Longmans, Green, and Company.
- Hickey, William (1848). The constitution of the United States of America. Philadelphia: T. K. & P. G. Collins.
- Jameson, John Franklin (1889). Essays in the constitutional history of the United States in the formative period, 1775-1789. Boston: Houghton.
- McMaster, John Bach (1896). With the fathers; studies in the history of the United States. New York: D. Appleton and Company. (Note: Work contains references to the U. S. Constitution throughout, with a chapter dedicated to the Founding Fathers and their creation of the Constitution.)
- —— (1887). The framers and the framing of the Constitution. New York: Century Company.
- Meigs, William Montgomery (1899). The Growth of the Constitution in the Federal Convention of 1787. J. B. Lippincott Company.
- Miller, Samuel Freeman (1891). Lectures on the Constitution of the United States. New York: Banks and Bros.
- Parsons, Theophilus (1861). The Constitution, its origin, function and authority. Boston: Little, Brown and company.
- Paschal, George Washington (1876). The Constitution of the United States defined and carefully annotated. Washington, D.C.: Morrison.
- Porter, Luther Henry (1883). Outlines of the constitutional history of the United States. New York: H. Holt and company.
- Schouler, James (1880). History of the United States of America under the Constitution: 1783–1801. Vol. I. New York: Dodd, Mead & Company.
- —— (1880). History of the United States of America under the Constitution: 1801–1817. Vol. II. New York: Dodd, Mead & Company.
- —— (1880). History of the United States of America under the Constitution: 1817–1831. Vol. III. New York: Dodd, Mead & Company.
- —— (1880). History of the United States of America under the Constitution: 1831–1847. Vol. IV. New York: Dodd, Mead & Company.
- —— (1880). History of the United States of America under the Constitution: 1847–1861. Vol. V. New York: Dodd, Mead & Company.
- —— (1880). History of the United States of America under the Constitution: The Civil War. Vol. VI. New York: Dodd, Mead & Company.
- —— (1880). History of the United States of America under the Constitution: The Reconstruction Period. Vol. VII. New York: Dodd, Mead & Company.
- Sterne, Simon (1882). Constitutional history and political development of the United States. New York: Cassell, Petter, Galpin & co.
- Story, Joseph (1833). Commentaries on the Constitution of the United States. Vol. I. Cambridge Massachusetts: Hilliard, Gray, and Company.
- —— (1833). Commentaries on the Constitution of the United States. Vol. II. Cambridge Massachusetts: Hilliard, Gray, and Company.
- —— (1842). A Familiar Exposition of the Constitution of the United States: Containing a Brief Commentary. Boston: Thomas H. Webb & Company.
- Thayer, James Bradley (1893). The Origin and Scope of the American Doctrine of Constitutional Law. Little, Brown, and Company.
- Towle, Nathaniel Carter (1871). A History and Analysis of the Constitution of the United States. Boston: Little, Brown and Company.
- Von Holst, Hermann (1876). The constitutional and political history of the United States. Vol. I. Translated by Lalor, John J.; Mason, Alfred B. Chicago: Callahan & Company.
- —— (1879). The constitutional and political history of the United States. Vol. II. Translated by Lalor, John J. Chicago: Callahan & Company.
- —— (1885). The constitutional and political history of the United States. Vol. III. Translated by Lalor, John J.; Shorey, Paul. Chicago: Callahan & Company.
- —— (1885). The constitutional and political history of the United States. Vol. IV. Translated by Lalor, John J. Chicago: Callahan & Company.
- —— (1885). The constitutional and political history of the United States. Vol. V. Translated by ——. Chicago: Callahan & Company.
- —— (1889). The constitutional and political history of the United States. Vol. VI. Translated by ——. Chicago: Callahan & Company.
- —— (1892). The constitutional and political history of the United States. Vol. VII. Translated by ——. Chicago: Callahan & Company.
- —— (1892). The constitutional and political history of the United States. Vol. VIII. Chicago: Callahan & Company.
- Willoughby, Westel Woodbury (1890). The Supreme court of the United States: its history and influence in our constitutional system. Baltimore: The Johns Hopkins press.
- Yates, Robert; Lansing, John; Martin, Luther (1821). Secret Proceedings and Debates of the Convention Assembled at Philadelphia, in the Year 1787: For the Purpose of Forming the United States of America. Albany, New York: Websters and Skinners.
- Political history of the United States. New York: The Federal book concern. 1899. (Note: Numerous authors and editors: Work contains numerous references to the U. S. Constitution in relation to statesmen, events and ideas throughout.)

=== Journals 1 ===
- Barker, Robert S. (June 1896). "The Originality of the United States Constitution". The Yale Law Journal. 5 (6). The Yale Law Journal Co., Inc.: 105–130. doi:10.2307/781281. JSTOR 781281.
- Burroughs, W. H. (November 1876). "Limitations Imposed by the Constitution of the United States on the Taxing Powers of the States". The American Law Register. 24 (11). The University of Pennsylvania Law Review: 625–638. doi:10.2307/3303925. JSTOR 3303925. Archived from the original on October 8, 2014.
- Dunning, William A. (December 1887). "The Constitution of the United States in Reconstruction". Political Science Quarterly. 2 (4). Oxford University Press: 558–602. doi:10.2307/2139470. JSTOR 2139470.
- Egle, William H. (1880). "The Constitutional Convention of 1776 (continued)". The Pennsylvania Magazine of History and Biography. 4 (2). University of Pennsylvania Press: 225–233. JSTOR 20084457.
- —— (1880). "The Constitutional Convention of 1776 (concluded)". The Pennsylvania Magazine of History and Biography. 4 (3). University of Pennsylvania Press: 361–372. JSTOR 20084466.
- Ford, Douglas M. (January 1889). "The Growth of the Freedom of the Press". The English Historical Review. 4 (13). Oxford University Press: 1–12. JSTOR 546861.
- Friedenwald, Herbert (1895). "The Continental Congress". The Pennsylvania Magazine of History and Biography. 19 (2). University of Pennsylvania Press: 197–207. JSTOR 20083644.
- Robinson, James Harvey (October 1890). "The Original and Derived Features of the Constitution". The Annals of the American Academy of Political and Social Science. 1 (2). Sage Publications: University of Utah: 203–249. doi:10.1177/000271629000100203. JSTOR 1008806. S2CID 144137664.
- Thorpe, Francis Newton (September 1891). "Recent Constitution-Making in the United States". The Annals of the American Academy of Political and Social Science. 2 (2). Sage Publications, Inc. in association with the American Academy of Political and Social Science: 1–57. doi:10.1177/000271629100200201. JSTOR 1008925. S2CID 144103689.
- "Religious Liberty under the Federal Constitution". Harvard Law Review. 11 (8). The Harvard Law Review Association: 542–543. March 25, 1898. doi:10.2307/1322168. JSTOR 1322168.
Top

== 20th century publications ==
- Ackerman, Bruce (1991). We the People. Vol. I. Cambridge, MA: Belknap Press of Harvard University Press. ISBN 978-0-6749-4841-9.
- —— (1991). We the People. Vol. II. Cambridge, MA: Belknap Press of Harvard University Press. ISBN 978-0-6740-0397-2.
- Adams, Willi Paul (1980). The First American Constitutions: Republican Ideology and the Making of the State Constitutions in the Revolutionary Era. Chapel Hill, NC: University of North Carolina Press. ISBN 0-8078-1388-5.
- Adler, Mortimer & Gorman, William (1975). The American Testament: for the Institute for Philosophical Research and the Aspen Institute for Humanistic Studies. New York: Praeger. ISBN 978-0-275-34060-5.
- Agel, Jerome B.; Cantor, Milton (1997). Words that make America great. New York: Random House. ISBN 978-0-3757-0651-6.
- Agresto, John (1984). The Supreme Court and Constitutional Democracy. Ithaca, NY: Cornell University Press. ISBN 978-1-5017-12906.
- Alexander, John K. (1990). The Selling of the Constitutional Convention: A History of News Coverage. Rowman & Littlefield. ISBN 978-0-9456-1215-5.
- Allan, David (1993). Virtue, Learning, and the Scottish Enlightenment: ideas of scholarship in early modern history. Edinburgh: Edinburgh University Press. ISBN 978-0-7486-7388-9.
- Amar, Akhil Reed (1998). The Bill of Rights: Creation and Reconstruction. New Haven, CT: Yale University Press. ISBN 0-300-07379-8.
- Ames, Herman Vandenburg (1900). State documents on Federal relations: the states and the United States. Philadelphia: Department of History of the University of Pennsylvania.
- —— (1906). State documents on federal relations: the states and the United States. Philadelphia: Department of History of the University of Pennsylvania.
- Anastaplo, George (1989) [1986]. The Constitution of 1787: a commentary. Baltimore: Johns Hopkins University Press. ISBN 978-0-8018-36060.
- Anderson, Thornton (1993). Creating the Constitution: The Convention of 1787 and the First Congress. Pennsylvania State University Press. ISBN 978-0-2710-0913-1.
- Arthur, John (1989). The unfinished constitution: philosophy and constitutional practice. Belmont, California: Wadsworth Pub. Co. ISBN 978-0-53410-0148.
- Ashworth, Marjorie (1987). To Create a Nation: The Constitutional Convention of 1787. McLean, VA: Link Press. ISBN 0-912991-05-4.
- Bacon, Charles William (1916). The American plan of government: the Constitution of the United States as interpreted by accepted authorities. New York and London: G.P. Putnam's Sons.
- Bacon, Gaspar G. (1953). Gaspar G. Bacon Lectures on the Constitution of the United States. Boston University Press.
- Baldwin, Henry (1970). A general view of the origin and nature of the Constitution and government of the United States. New York: Da Capo Press. ISBN 978-0-3067-1944-8.
- Ball, Terence; Pocock, J.G.A., eds. (1988). Conceptual Change and the Constitution. Lawrence, KS: University Press of Kansas. ISBN 0-7006-0369-7.
- Banning, Lance (1978). The Jeffersonian persuasion: Evolution of a party ideology. Ithaca, New York: Cornell University Press. ISBN 0-8014-1151-3.
- —— (1989). After the Constitution: party conflict in the New Republic. Wadsworth Publishing Company. ISBN 978-0-5341-1003-1.
- Barbash, Fred (1987). The founding: a dramatic account of the writing of the Constitution. Linden Press/Simon and Schuster. ISBN 978-0-6715-5256-5.
- Barlow, J. Jackson; Levy, Leonard Williams (1988). The American Founding: Essays on the Formation of the Constitution. New York: Greenwood Press. ISBN 978-0-313-25610-3.
- Barron, Jerome A.; Dienes, C. Thomas (1991). Constitutional law. Vol. III. St. Paul, Minnesota: West Publishing Company. ISBN 978-0-3148-0211-8. — Three volumes in one work, 2013
- Bauer, Elizabeth (1965). Commentaries on the Constitution, 1790-1860. New York: Russell & Russell.
- Beard, Charles A. (1912). The Supreme court and the Constitution. New York, The Macmillan company.
- —— (1914). An Economic Interpretation of the Constitution of the United States. New York: The Macmillan Company.
- —— (1948). The Enduring Federalist. Doubleday & Company, Inc.
- Beck, James M. (1922). The Constitution of the United States; a brief study of the genesis, formulation and political philosophy of the Constitution of the United States. London, Published for "The Daily Telegraph" by Hodder and Stoughton.
- Beeman, Richard; Botein, Stephen; Carter, Edward C. II, eds. (1987). Beyond Confederation: Origins of the Constitution and American National Identity. Chapel Hill, NC: University of North Carolina Press (Published for the Institute of Early American History and Culture, Williamsburg, Virginia). ISBN 0-8078-1719-8.
- Beer, Samuel H. (1993). To Make a Nation: The Rediscovery of American Federalism. Cambridge, MA: Belknap of Harvard University Press. ISBN 0-674-89317-4.
- Bennett, Walter Hartwell (1983) [1964]. American Theories of Federalism. University of Alabama Press.
- Benton, Wilbourn E., ed. (1986). Drafting the U.S. Constitution: Volume Two. Texas A&M University Press. ISBN 978-0-8909-6217-6.
- Benson, Lee (1960). Turner and Beard: American Historical Writing Reconsidered. Glencoe, IL: Free Press.
- Berger, Raoul (1987). Federalism: the Founders' design. Norman : University of Oklahoma Press. ISBN 978-0-8061-2059-1.
- Berlowitz, Leslie; Donoghue, Denis; Menand, Louis, eds. (1968). America in theory. Oxford University Press. ISBN 978-0-1950-5396-8.
- Berns, Walter (1987). Taking the constitution seriously. New York: Simon and Schuster. ISBN 978-0-6716-0232-1.
- Bernstein, Richard B. (1993). Amending America: If We Love the Constitution So Much, Why Do We Keep Trying to Change It?. Lawrence, KS: University Press of Kansas. ISBN 0-7006-0715-3.
- —— (1987). Are We to Be a Nation? The Making of the Constitution. Cambridge, MA: Harvard University Press. ISBN 978-0-674-04475-3.
- Bickel, Alexander M. (1975). The Morality of Consent. New Haven, CT: Yale University Press. ISBN 0-300-01911-4.
- Bishop, Hilman M. (1950). Why Rhode Island Opposed the Federal Constitution. Roger Williams Press.
- Black, Henry Campbell (1919). The Relation of the Executive Power to Legislation. Princeton University Press. ISBN 978-0-4050-5855-4.
- Black, Frederick R. (1973). The American Revolution as "yardstick" in the Debates on the Constitution, 1787-1788. American Philosophical Society.
- Black, William Harman (1933). Our Unknown Constitution. Real Book Company.
- Bloom, Sol (1986). The story of the Constitution. Washington, DC: National Archives and Records Administration. ISBN 0-911333-45-2.
- Boorstin, Daniel J. (1973). The Americans: The Democratic Experience. New York: Random House. ISBN 0-394-48724-9. Pulitzer Prize for History, 1974
- Bowen, Catherine Drinker (1986) [1966]. Miracle at Philadelphia: The Story of the Constitutional Convention. New York: Little, Brown. ISBN 978-0-3161-0398-5.
- Bowie, Robert R.; Friedrich, Carl J. (1954). Studies in Federalism. Boston: Little, Brown.
- Bradford, Melvin Eustace (1994). Founding Fathers: brief lives of the framers of the United States Constitution. University Press of Kansas. ISBN 0-7006-0656-4.
- Boardman, Roger Sherman (2017) [1938]. Roger Sherman: Signer and Statesman. Philadelphia: University of Pennsylvania Press. ISBN 978-1-5128-0039-5. (Note: Book contains three chapters devoted to Sherman's involvement with the drafting of the Constitution and the Federal Convention in Philadelphia.)
- Brown, Robert E. (1956). Charles Beard and the Constitution: A Critical Analysis of an Economic Interpretation of the Constitution. Princeton, NJ: Princeton University Press.
- —— (1963). Reinterpretation of the Formation of the American Constitution. Boston: Boston University Press. ISBN 978-0-5985-4177-2.
- Brown, Roger H. (1993). Redeeming the Republic: Federalists, Taxation, and the Origins of the Constitution. Johns Hopkins University Press. ISBN 978-0-8018-6355-4.
- Buckley, John Edward (1972). The Role of Rhetoric in the Ratification of the Federal Constitution, 1787-88. Northwestern University.
- Burdick, Charles Kellogg (1922). The law of the American Constitution; its origin and development. New York, London, G.P. Putnam's Sons.
- Caldwell, Lynton K. (1944). The Administrative Theories of Hamilton & Jefferson: Their Contribution to Thought on Public Administration. New York: Rusell & Rusell inc.
- Calloway, Colin G. (1998) [1997]. New Worlds for All: Indians, Europeans, and the Remaking of Early America. Baltimore, MD: Johns Hopkins University Press. ISBN 0-8018-5959-X.
- Carey, George Wescott (1959). In Defense of the Constitution. Liberty Fund. ISBN 978-0-86597-1370.
- Case, Nelson (1904). Constitutional history of the United States. New York: The Trow press.
- Chafee, Zechariah (1920). Freedom of speech. New York: Harcourt, Brace and Howe.
- —— (1956). Three Human Rights in the Constitution. Lawrence, KS: University Press of Kansas.
- Chandler, Ralph C. (1985). The Constitutional law dictionary. Vol. I. Santa Barbara, Calif.: ABC-Clio Informations Services. ISBN 978-0-8743-6031-8.
- —— (1987). The Constitutional law dictionary, Supplement. Vol. I. Santa Barbara, Calif.: ABC-Clio Informations Services. ISBN 978-0-8743-6484-2.
- —— (1985). The Constitutional law dictionary, Supplement. Vol. II. Santa Barbara, Calif.: ABC-Clio Informations Services.
- Charleton, James H; Ferris, Robert G.; Ryan, Mary C. (1986). Framers of the Constitution. Washington, DC: National Archives and Records Administration. ISBN 0-911333-43-6.
- Cleaver, James Madison (1934). Constitutional Liberty: A Brief Statement of the Nature and Sources of Human Freedom. Constitutional law.
- Cohen, William (1997). Constitutional law: civil liberty and individual rights. Westbury, N.Y.: Foundation Press. ISBN 978-1-5994-1170-5.
- —— (1999). Constitutional law: civil liberty and individual rights; 1987 Supplement. Westbury, N.Y.: Foundation Press. ISBN 978-1-5994-1279-5.
- —— (1997). Constitutional law: civil liberty and individual rights; 1997 Supplement. Westbury, N.Y.: Foundation Press. ISBN 978-0-8827-7913-3.
- Cohler, Anne M. (1988). Montesquieu's comparative politics and the spirit of American constitutionalism. Lawrence, Kansas: University Press of Kansas. ISBN 978-0-7006-0376-3.
- Collier, Christopher; Collier, James Lincoln (1986). Decision in Philadelphia: The Constitutional Convention of 1787. New York: Random House. ISBN 0-394-52346-6.
- Commager, Henry Steele (1975). Jefferson, nationalism, and the enlightenment. New York: G. Braziller. ISBN 978-0-8076-0765-7.
- —— (1977). The empire of reason: how Europe imagined and America realized the enlightenment. Garden City, New York: Anchor Press/Doubleday. ISBN 978-0-3851-1672-5. (Note: Covers how the European Enlightenment influenced the founding era in Colonial America.)
- Conley, Patrick T.; Kaminski, John P., eds. (1988). The Constitution and the states: the role of the original thirteen in the framing and adoption of the Federal Constitution. Madison, Wis.: Madison House Publishers. ISBN 0-945612-02-8.
- Corwin, Edward Samuel (1919). John Marshall and the Constitution. Yale University Press.
- —— (1955). Higher Law Background of American Constitutional Law. Cornell University Press.
- —— (1957). Court over Constitution: A Study of Judicial Review as an Instrument of Popular Government. Gloucester, Massachusetts: Peter Smith Publishers.
- —— (1981). Corwin on the Constitution. Vol. I. Ithaca: Cornell University Press. ISBN 978-0-8014-1381-0.
- —— (1981). Corwin on the Constitution. Vol. II. Ithaca: Cornell University Press. ISBN 978-1-5017-4171-5.
- Crosskey, William Winslow; Jeffery, William Jr. (1953). Politics and the Constitution in the history of the United States. Vol. I. University of Chicago Press.
- ——; —— (1953). Politics and the Constitution in the history of the United States. Vol. II. University of Chicago Press.
- ——; —— (1953). Politics and the Constitution in the history of the United States. Vol. III. University of Chicago Press.
- Currie, David P. (1997). The Constitution in Congress: The Federalist Period 1789-1801. University of Chicago Press. ISBN 978-0-2261-31146.
- Curry, James Allan (1997). Constitutional government: the American experience. Kendall/Hunt Pub. Co. ISBN 978-0-7575-1238-4.
- Dargo, George (1974). Roots of the Republic; a new perspective on early American constitutionalism. New York: Praeger.
- De Grazia, Alfred (1951). Public and Republic: political representation in America. New York: Knopf.
- Dauer, Manning Julian (1953). The Adams Federalists. Baltimore: The Johns Hopkins press.
- DePauw, Linda Grant (1966). The Eleventh Pillar: New York State and the Federal Constitution. Ithaca, NY: Cornell University Press.
- Dietze, Gottfried; Mason, Alpheus Thomas (1964). Essays on the American Constitution; a commemorative volume in honor of Alpheus T. Mason. Englewood Cliffs, New Jersey: Prentice-Hall.
- Drake, Frederick D.; Nelson, Lynn R., eds. (1999). States' rights and American federalism: a documentary history. Westport, Connecticut: Greenwood Press. ISBN 978-0-3133-0573-3.
- Ducat, Craig R. (1983). Constitutional Interpretation: Cases, Essays, Materials. West Publishing Company. ISBN 978-0-3146-9640-3.
- Dudley, William (1995). The Creation of the Constitution: Opposing Viewpoints. San Diego, CA: Greenhaven Press. ISBN 978-1565-10221-7.
- Dumbauld, Edward (1964). The Constitution of the United States. Norman, University of Oklahoma Press.
- —— (1979). The Bill of Rights and What It Means Today. Westport, CT: Greenwood Press. ISBN 978-0-3132-1215-4.
- Eidlin, Fred H. (1983). Ehrmann, Henry Walter (ed.). Constitutional democracy: essays in comparative politics: a festschrift in honor of Henry W. Ehrmann. Boulder, Colorado: Westview Press. ISBN 978-0-3671-7028-8.
- Eidelberg, Paul (1986). The Philosophy of the American Constitution: A Reinterpretation of the Intentions of the Founding Fathers. University Press of America. ISBN 978-0-8191-5341-8.
- Elazar, Daniel Judah; Kincaid, John (1983). Covenant, polity, and constitutionalism. Lanham: University Press of America. ISBN 978-0-8191-3709-8.
- Elliott, William Yandell (1935). The Need for Constitutional Reform: A Program for National Security. Whittlesey House, McGraw-Hill Book Company.
- Elster, John; Slagstad, Rune, eds. (1988). Constitutionalism and democracy. Cambridge; New York: Cambridge University Press. ISBN 978-0-5214-5721-7.
- Engdahl, David E. (1987). Constitutional federalism in a nutshell. St. Paul, Minnesota: West Publishing Company. ISBN 978-0-3143-8329-7.
- Epstein, Richard A. (1984). The political theory of the Federalist. Chicago: University of Chicago Press. ISBN 978-0-2262-1301-9.
- Farrand, Max (1921). The Fathers of the Constitution. New Haven, CT: Yale University Press.
- —— (1913). The Framing of the Constitution of the United States. New Haven: Yale University Press.
- Fausold, Martin L.; Shank, Alan (1991). The Constitution and the American presidency. Albany: State University of New York Press. ISBN 978-0-7914-0467-6.
- Fehrenbacher, Don E. (1981). The Dred Scott Case: Its Significance in American Law and Politics. New York: Oxford University Press. ISBN 0-19-502882-1.
- Fenn, Percy T. (1948). The Development Of The Constitution. New York: Appleton-Century-Crofts, Inc.
- Forbes, Duncan (1975). Hume's philosophical politics. Cambridge; New York: Cambridge University Press. ISBN 978-0-52120-7546. "Hume advocated the grant of total independence to the American colonies ..."
- Foster, James Mitchell (1911). The Secular Constitution of the United States: Our Nation's Death-warrant. Boston: [publisher not identified].
- Frankfurter, Felix (1930). The public & its government. New Haven, Yale University Press.
- Friedman, Lawrence Meir (1973). A history of American law. New York, Simon and Schuster. ISBN 978-0-6712-1226-1.
- —— (1978). American law and the constitutional order: historical perspectives. Harvard University Press. ISBN 978-0-6740-2525-7.
- Garvey, John H.; Aleinikoff, T. Alexander, eds. (1989). Modern Constitutional Theory: A Reader. St. Paul, MN: West Publishing Co. ISBN 0-314-51813-4.
- Gillespie, Michael Allen; Lienesch, Michael (1989). Ratifying the Constitution. Lawrence, KS: University Press of Kansas. ISBN 0-7006-0402-2.
- Goldwin, Robert A.; Kaufman, Art (1988). Constitution makers on constitution making: the experience of eight nations. Washington, D.C.: American Enterprise Institute for Public Policy Research.
- ——; Schambra, William A., eds. (1982). How Capitalistic is the Constitution?. Washington, DC: American Enterprise Institute for Public Policy Research. ISBN 0-8447-3477-2.
- Goode, Stephen (1983). New federalism: states rights in america. Scholastic, Inc. ISBN 978-0-5310-4501-5.
- Gribin, Anthony V. (2003). Constitution of the United States: Background, Analysis and Bibliography. Nova Science Publications Inc. ISBN 978-1-5903-33198.
- Greene, Jack P. (1986). Peripheries and center: constitutional development in the extended polities of the British Empire and the United States, 1607-1788. Athens, Georgia: University of Georgia Press. ISBN 978-0-8203-0878-4.
- —— (1994). Negotiated authorities: essays in colonial political and Constitutional history. Charlottesville: University Press of Virginia. ISBN 978-0-8139-1517-3.
- Groce, George Cuthbert (1937). William Samuel Johnson; a Maker of the Constitution. Columbia University Press. ISBN 978-0-4040-2936-4.
- Grossman, Joel B., ed. (1972). Constitutional law and judicial policy making. New York: John Wiley & Sons. ISBN 978-0-4713-2850-6.
- Hachten, William A. (1968). The Supreme Court on freedom of the press: decisions and dissents. Ames, Iowa: Iowa State University Press. ISBN 978-0-8138-0704-1.
- Hagemann, Frances L (1987). Study guide for the United States Constitution. Evanston, Ill.: McDougal, Littell. ISBN 978-0-8660-9298-2.
- Hardin, Charles Meyer (1989). Constitutional reform in America: essays on the separation of powers. Ames: Iowa State University Press. ISBN 978-0-8138-0118-6.
- Hardin, Russell (2003) [1999]. Liberalism, constitutionalism, and democracy. Oxford; New York: Oxford University Press. ISBN 978-0-1915-2185-0.
- Hastings, Lyon (1936). The Constitution and the Men Who Made It: The Story of the Constitutional Convention, 1787. Houghton Mifflin Company.
- Hendry, James McLeod; Bishop, William (2021) [1955]. Treaties and federal constitutions. Washington: Public Affairs Press. ISBN 978-1-0152-4066-7.
- Henkin, Louis (1966). Foreign affairs and the United States Constitution. Oxford and New York: Clarendon Press and Oxford University Press. ISBN 978-0-1982-6098-1.
- —— (1978). The Rights of Man Today. Boulder, CO: Westview Press. ISBN 0-89158-174-X.
- Hickok, Eugene W. (1991). The Bill of Rights: original meaning and current understanding. University Press of Virginia. ISBN 978-0-8139-1336-0.
- Hirschfield, Robert S. (1962). The Constitution and the Court: the development of the basic law through judicial interpretation. New York: Random House.
- Hockett, Homer C. (1939). The Constitutional History Of The United States 1826-1876. The Macmillan Company.
- Hoffer, Peter C. (1937). The Constitutional crisis and the rise of a nationalistic view of history in America
- Holcombe, Arthur Norman (1956). The Role of Washington in the Framing of the Constitution. (none listed).
- Hood, Silas (1911). United States Constitution and socialism. Milwaukee: Social-Democratic Publishing Co.
- Howard, Dick (1989). The birth of American political thought, 1763-87. Translated by Curtis, David Ames. Minneapolis: University of Minnesota Press. ISBN 978-0-8166-1832-3.
- Howe, Mark De Wolfe (1965). The garden and the wilderness; religion and government in American constitutional history. Chicago: University of Chicago Press.
- Hudon, Edward Gerard (1963). Freedom of speech and press in America. Washington, D.C.: Public Affairs Press.
- Hutchinson, David (1928). The Foundations of the Constitution (reprinted in 1975). Grafton Press. ISBN 0-8216-0254-3.
- Huyler, Jerome (1995). Locke in America: The Moral Philosophy of the Founding Era. Kansas: University Press of Kansas. ISBN 978-0-7006-1108-9. "John Locke"
- Jensen, Merrill (1950). The New Nation: A History of the United States During the Confederation, 1781-1789. New York: Alfred A. Knopf, Inc.
- —— (1964). The Making of the American Constitution. Princeton, N.J. and London: Van Nostrand. ISBN 978-0-4420-0075-2.
- ——; Kaminski, John P; Saladino, Gaspare J. (1976). The Documentary History of the Ratification of the Constitution: Constitutional Documents and Records, 1776–1787. Vol. 1. Madison, WI: Wisconsin Historical Society Press.
- Jillson, Calvin C. (1988). Constitution Making: Conflict and Consensus in the Federal Convention of 1787. New York: Agathon Press. ISBN 0-87586-081-8.
- Johnson, Alvin Walter (1948). Separation of church and state in the United States. University of Minnesota Press.
- Johnston, Alexander (1902). The United States, its history and Constitution. New York: Charles Scribner's Sons.
- Jones, Robert F. (1978). The formation of the Constitution. Huntington, New York: R.E. Krieger Publishing Company. ISBN 978-0-0308-4168-2.
- Kahn, Ronald (1994). The Supreme Court and constitutional theory, 1953-1993. University Press of Kansas. ISBN 978-0-7006-0666-5.
- Kaminski, John P.; Leffler, Richard (1991). Creating the Constitution: A History in Documents. Center for the Study of the American Constitution.
- Kammen, Michael (1986). The Origins of the American Constitution: A Documentary History. New York: Penguin Publishing Group. ISBN 978-0-1400-8744-4.
- —— (1986). A Machine That Would Go of Itself: The Constitution in American Culture. New York: Knopf. ISBN 978-1-1385-18391.
- Katz, Stanley N. (1969). The Origins of American Constitutional Thought. LSU Press. ISBN 978-0-80711-5060.
- Kauper, Paul G. (1964). Religion and the Constitution. Baton Rouge: Louisiana State University Press.
- Keenan, Joseph T. (1988). The Constitution of the United States: an unfolding story. Chicago, Ill.: Dorsey Press. ISBN 978-0-5341-0627-0.
- Kelly, Alfred Hinsey (1972). Foundations of freedom in the American Constitution. Freeport, New York: Books for Libraries Press. ISBN 0-8369-2696-X.
- ——; Harbison, Winfred A. (1991). The American Constitution Its Origins And Development. Vol. I. New York: W. W. Norton & Company, Inc. ISBN 0-393-96056-0.
- ——; —— (1948). The American Constitution Its Origins And Development. Vol. II. New York: W. W. Norton & Company, Inc. ISBN 0-393-96056-0.
- ——; —— (1991). The American Constitution Its Origins And Development. Vol. V. New York: W. W. Norton & Company, Inc. ISBN 0-393-96056-0.
- ——; —— (1948). The American Constitution Its Origins And Development. New York: W. W. Norton & Company, Inc.
- Kenyon, Cecelia Marie (1963). "An Economic Interpretation of the Constitution" After Fifty Years. (No publisher listed).
- Hamilton, Alexander (1969). Kerns, Gerald (ed.). The Hamiltonian Constitution: An analysis of the Interpretation Given to Various Provisions of the United States Constitution. Indiana University Press.
- Ketcham, Ralph, ed. (1986). The Anti-Federalist Papers and the Constitutional Convention Debates. New York: Mentor (Penguin Publishing Group). ISBN 978-1-1016-5134-6.
- Klarman, Michael J. (2016). The Framers' Coup: The Making of the United States Constitution. New York: Oxford University Press. ISBN 978-0-19-994203-9.
- Kmiec, Douglas W. (1998). Individual rights and the American constitution. Cincinnati, Ohio: Anderson Pub. Co. ISBN 978-1-6304-3611-7.
- Koch, Adrienne (1965). The American Enlightenment: The Shaping of the American Experiment and a Free Society. New York: George Braziller.
- Kohn, Hans (1960) [1944]. The Idea of Nationalism: A Study in Its Origins and Background. New York: The MacMillan Company.
- Konvitz, Milton R. (1957). Fundamental Liberties of a Free People. Ithaca, N.Y., Cornell University Press. ISBN 978-1-4128-2427-9.
- —— (1962). Fundamental Liberties of a Free People: Religion, Speech, Press, Assembly. Ithaca, N.Y., Cornell University Press. ISBN 978-0-8014-0783-3.
- —— (1965). Bill of rights reader; leading constitutional cases. Ithaca, N.Y., Cornell University Press. ISBN 978-0-8014-0783-3.
- —— (1968). Religious Liberty and Conscience: A Constitutional Inquiry. Ithaca, N.Y., Cornell University Press. ISBN 978-0-8014-0783-3.
- Kurtz, Stephen G., ed. (1972). The Federalists: Creators and Critics of the Union, 1780-1801. Wiley. ISBN 978-0-4715-1112-0.
- Kyvig, David E. (1996). Explicit and Authentic Acts: Amending the U.S. Constitution, 1776-1995. Lawrence, KS: University Press of Kansas. ISBN 0-7006-0792-7.
- LaHaye, Tim (1987). Faith of our Founding Fathers. Brentwood, Tennessee: Wolgemuth & Hyatt.
- Laslett, Peter (1960). Jon Locke Two Treatises Of Government. Cambridge: The Cambridge University Press. (Note: Laslett devotes much of his work to coverage of the historical and academic issues regarding Locke, followed by Locke's Two Treaties.)
- Leach, Richard H. (1970). American federalism. New York: W. W. Norton & Company. ISBN 978-0-3930-5402-6.
- Levin, Daniel Lessard (1999). Representing Popular Sovereignty: The Constitution in American Political Culture. Albany, NY: State University of New York Press. ISBN 0-7914-4105-9.
- Levy, Leonard Williams (1966). Freedom of the Press from Zenger to Jefferson: Early American Libertarian Theories. Indianapolis: Bobbs-Merrill Company.
- —— (1972). Judgments; essays on American constitutional history. Chicago: Quadrangle Books. ISBN 978-0-8129-0243-3.
- —— (1988). Original Intent and the Framers' Constitution. New York: Macmillan. ISBN 978-0-0291-8791-3.
- ——; Mahoney, Dennis J., eds. (1987). The Framing and Ratification of the Constitution. New York: Macmillan; London. ISBN 978-0-02-918790-6.
- Lively, Donald E; Roberts, Dorothy E.; Weaver, Russell L. (1994). First Amendment Anthology. Ohio: Anderson Publishing Company. ISBN 978-0-8708-4265-8. "Freedom of Speech"
- Livingston, William S. (1956). Federalism and constitutional change. Oxford : Clarendon Press.
- Lobel, Jules, ed. (1988). A Less Than Perfect Union: Alternative Perspectives on the U.S. Constitution. New York: Monthly Review Press. ISBN 0-85345-738-7.
- Lomask, Milton (1980). The spirit of 1787: the making of our Constitution. New York: Farrar Straus Giroux. ISBN 978-0-4497-02628.
- Lutz, Donald S. (1988). The origins of American constitutionalism. Baton Rouge: Louisiana State University Press. ISBN 0-807114790.
- Mace, George (1979). Locke, Hobbes, and the Federalist Papers: An Essay on the Genesis of the American Political Heritage. Southern Illinois University Press. ISBN 978-0-8093-0890-3. "Key words: John Locke, Montesquieu, Founding Fathers, Publius, Hobbes"
- Main, Jackson Turner (1961). The Antifederalists: critics of the Constitution, 1781-1788. University of North Carolina Press.
- —— (1973). Political parties before the Constitution. University of North Carolina Press. ISBN 9780807811948.
- —— (1973). Political parties before the Constitution. University of North Carolina Press. ISBN 978-0-8078-1194-8.
- Maltz, Earl M. (1990). Civil Rights, the Constitution, and Congress, 1863-1869. University Press of Kansas. ISBN 978-0-7006-04678.
- Mansfield, Harvey C. Jr. (1991). America's Constitutional Soul. Baltimore: Johns Hopkins University Press. ISBN 978-0-8018-4114-9.
- Manuel, Frank E., ed. (1965). The Enlightenment. Englewood Cliffs, New Jersey: Prentice-Hall, Inc.
- Marks, Frederick W. (1973). Independence on Trial: Foreign Affairs and the Making of the Constitution. Baton Rouge, LA: Louisiana State University Press. ISBN 0-8071-0052-8.
- Marrin, Alber t (2001). George Washington & the founding of a nation. New York: Dutton Publishers. ISBN 0-5-25464816.
- Mason, Alpheus Thomas (1964). The States rights debate: antifederalism and the Constitution; with selected documents. Englewood Cliffs, New Jersey: Prentice-Hall. ISBN 978-0-19-501553-9.
- Matteson, David M. (1970). Organization of the Government Under the Constitution. New York: Da Capo Press.
- McCloskey, Robert Green (1957). Kendall, M.G. (ed.). Essays in constitutional law. New York: Alfred A. Knopf.
- McDonald, Forrest (1979) [1965]. E Pluribus Unum: The Formation of the American Republic, 1776-1790. Indianapolis, IN: Liberty Fund. ISBN 0-9139-6658-4.
- —— (1985). Novus Ordo Seclorum: The Intellectual Origins of the Constitution. Lawrence, KS: University Press of Kansas. ISBN 978-0-7006-0311-4.
- —— (1958). We the People: The Economic Origins of the Constitution. Chicago: University of Chicago Press.
- McGee, Dorothy Horton (1968). Framers of the Constitution. New York: Dodd, Mead.
- McGehee, Lucius Polk (1906). Due process of law under the federal Constitution. Edward Thompson company.
- McLaughlin, Andrew C. (1905). The Confederation and the Constitution, 1783-1789. New York: Harper & Brothers.
- —— (1935). A Constitutional History of the United States. New York: Appleton-Century-Crofts.
- McPhillips, Martin (1985). The Constitutional Convention. Morristown, N.J.: Silver Burdett. ISBN 978-0-3820-9435-4.
- Mead, Walter B. (1987). The United States Constitution: personalities, principles, and issues. Columbia, S.C.: University of South Carolina Press. ISBN 0-87249-520-5.
- Mee, Charles L. (1987). The genius of the people. New York: Harper & Row. ISBN 978-0-0601-5702-9.
- Meigs, William Montgomery (1919). The relation of the judiciary to the Constitution. New York: Neale Pub. Co.
- Miller, John Chester (1970). Toward a More Perfect Union: The American Republic, 1783-1815. Glenview, IL: Scott, Foresman.
- Millett, Stephen M. (1975). A selected bibliography of American constitutional history. Santa Barbara: Clio Books. ISBN 0-8743-6204-0.
- Mitchell, Broadus; Mitchell, Louise Pearson (1975). A Biography of the Constitution of the United States: Its Origin, Formation, Adoption, Interpretation. New York: Oxford University Press. ISBN 0-1950-1932-6.
- Moore, Wayne D. (1996). Constitutional rights and powers of the people. Princeton University Press. ISBN 978-0-6910-0244-6.
- Morgan, Edmund Sears (1956). The Birth of the Republic, 1763-89. University of Chicago Press. ISBN 978-0-2265-3761-0.
- —— (1988). Inventing the People: The Rise of Popular Sovereignty in England and America. New York: Norton. ISBN 0-393-30623-2.
- Morris, Richard Brandon (1985). Witnesses at the Creation: Hamilton, Madison, Jay, and the Constitution. Holt, Rinehart, and Winston. ISBN 978-0-0306-2956-3.
- —— (1987). The Forging of the Union. New York: Harper & Row. ISBN 978-0-0609-1424-0.
- Muelder, Walter G.; Sears, Laurence (1940). The Development Of American Philosophy. Boston; New York: Houghton Mifflin Company.
- Murphy, William Patrick (1967). The Triumph of Nationalism: State Sovereignty, the Founding Fathers, and the Making of the Constitution. Quadrangle Books.
- Nardulli, Peter F. (1992). The Constitution and American political development: an institutional perspective. Urbana: University of Illinois Press. ISBN 978-0-2520-6174-5.
- Nedelsky, Jennifer (1990). Private property and the limits of American constitutionalism: the Madisonian framework and its legacy. Chicago: University of Chicago Press. ISBN 0-2-26569705.
- Nevins, Allan (1924). The American States During and After the Revolution, 1775-1789. New York: The Macmillan Company.
- Norton, Thomas James (1922). The Constitution of the United States, its sources and its application. Boston: Little, Brown and Company.
- O'Neill, James M. (1972). Religion And Education Under The Constitution. Da Capo Press. ISBN 978-0-3067-0228-0.
- Onuf, Peter S. (1986). The origins of the federal republic: jurisdictional controversies in the United States, 1775-1787. University of Pennsylvania Press. ISBN 0-8122-7889-5.
- Orfield, Lester B. (1971) [1942]. The amending of the Federal Constitution. New York: Da Capo Press. ISBN 978-0-3067-0094-1.
- Padover, Saul K.; Landynski, Jacob W. (1995). The Living U.S. Constitution (3rd rev. ed.). New York: Meridian. ISBN 978-0-452-01147-2.
- —— (1962). To Secure These Blessings: The Great Debates of the Constitutional Convention of 1787. New York: Washington Square Press.
- Patterson, Caleb Perry (1953). The constitutional principles of Thomas Jefferson. Austin: University of Texas Press.
- Peck, Robert S. (1992). The Bill of Rights & the politics of interpretation. St. Paul, MN: West Publication. Company. ISBN 978-0-31490-8810.
- Perry, Richard L. (1959). Sources of Our Liberties: Documentary Origins of Individual Liberties in the United States Constitution and Bill of Rights. Chicago: American Bar Foundation.
- Peters, William (1987). A more perfect union. New York: Crown Publishers Inc. ISBN 978-0-5175-6450-9.
- Peterson, Helen Stone (1974). The making of the United States Constitution. Champaign, Ill., Garrard Pub. Co. ISBN 978-0-8116-6509-4.
- Phelps, Glenn A. (1993). George Washington and American constitutionalism. Lawrence, Kansas: University Press of Kansas. ISBN 978-0-7006-0564-4.
- Pollak, Louis H. (1966). The Constitution and the Supreme Court; a documentary history. Vol. I. Cleveland Co.: World Pub.
- —— (1966). The Constitution and the Supreme Court; a documentary history. Vol. II. Cleveland Co.: World Pub.
- Pritchett, C. Herman (1959). The American Constitution. New York: McGraw-Hill.
- Putney, Albert H (2017) [1985]. United States constitutional history and law. Littleton, Colorado: F.B. Rothman & Company. ISBN 978-1-5278-9949-0.
- Qing Yu, Li (1988). "Dr. Sun Yat Sen and the U.S. Constitution". In Starr, Joseph Barton (ed.). The United States Constitution: Its Birth, Growth, and Influence in Asia. Hong Kong: Hong Kong University Press. ISBN 978-962-209-201-3.
- Rakove, Jack N. (1996). Original Meanings: Politics and Ideas in the Making of the Constitution. New York: Alfred A. Knopf. ISBN 0-394-57858-9.
- Rendall, Jane (1978). The Origins of the Scottish enlightenment. New York: St. Martin's Press. ISBN 978-1-7888-5422-1.
- Richards, David A. J. (1989). Foundations of American Constitutionalism. Oxford University Press. ISBN 978-0-1950-5939-7.
- Rosen, Gary (1999). American Compact: James Madison and the Problem of Founding. University Press of Kansas. ISBN 978-0-7006-09604.
- Rosenburg, John M. (1998). First in peace: George Washington, the Constitution, and the presidency. Brookfield, Connecticut: Millbrook Press. ISBN 978-0-7613-0422-7.
- Rossiter, Clinton (1964). Alexander Hamilton and the Constitution. New York: Harcourt, Brace & World.
- —— (1987) [1966]. 1787: The Grand Convention. New York: W.W. Norton. ISBN 978-0-393-30404-6.
- Rotunda, Ronald D.; Novak, John E. (1992). Treatise on constitutional law: substance and procedure. Vol. III. St. Paul, Minnesota: West Group. (Note: Volumes one and two not listed.)
- ——; —— (1999). Treatise on constitutional law: substance and procedure. Vol. IV. St. Paul, Minnesota: West Group. ISBN 978-0-3142-4062-0.
- ——; —— (1999). Treatise on constitutional law: substance and procedure. Vol. V. St. Paul, Minnesota: West Group. ISBN 978-0-3142-4062-0.
- Rutland, Robert Allen (1983). The Ordeal of the Constitution: The Antifederalists and the Ratification Struggle of 1787-1788. Boston: Northeastern University Press. ISBN 978-0930-35051-2.
- Schachner, Nathan (1954). The Founding Fathers. New York: G. P. Putnam and Sons.
- Schechter, Stephen L., ed. (1985). The Reluctant Pillar: New York and the Adoption of the Federal Constitution. Troy, NY: Russell Sage College. ISBN 0-930309-00-6.
- Schneider, Herbert W. (1946). A History Of American Philosophy. New York: Columbia University Press.
- Schneider, Isidor, ed. (1965). The Enlightenment: The Culture of the Eighteenth Century. New York: George Braziller.
- Schubert, Glendon A (1960). Constitutional politics: the political behavior of Supreme Court justices and the constitutional policies that they make. New York : Holt, Rinehart and Winson.
- Schuyler, Robert Livingston (1923). The Constitution of the United States; an historical survey of its formation. New York, The Macmillan Company.
- Schwartz, Bernard (1957). The Supreme Court, Constitutional Revolution in Retrospect. New York: Ronald Press Company.
- —— (1963). The Reins of Power: A Constitutional History of the United States. New York: Hill and Wang.
- —— (1973). From confederation to nation: the American Constitution, 1835-1877. Baltimore: Johns Hopkins University Press. ISBN 0-8018-1464-2.
- —— (1992) [1977]. The great rights of mankind: a history of the American Bill of Rights. Madison, Wisconsin: Madison House. ISBN 978-0-945612-28-5.
- Seldes, George (1971) [1935]. Leonard W. Levy (ed.). Freedom of the press (reprint). New York, Da Capo Press. ISBN 978-0-3067-0125-2.
- Semonche, John E. (1986). Religion & constitutional government in the United States: a historical overview with sources. Signal Books. ISBN 978-0-9300-9509-3.
- Shepard, E. Lee (1988). 'Reluctant Ratifiers: Virginia Considers the Federal Constitution. Richmond: Virginia Historical Society. ISBN 0-945015-01-1.
- Smith, Page (1978). The Constitution, a documentary and narrative history. New York: Morrow Quill. ISBN 978-0-6880-3349-1.
- Solberg, Winton U., ed. (1958). The Federal Convention and the Formation of the Union of the American States. Liberal Arts Press.
- Starr, Isidore (1978). The idea of liberty: first amendment freedoms. West Pub. Company. ISBN 978-0-8299-1017-9.
- Stedman, W. David (1987). Our ageless Constitution. Asheboro, North Carolina: W.D. Stedman Associates. ISBN 0-937-047015.
- Stewart, Michael Alexander (1990). Studies in the philosophy of the Scottish Enlightenment. Oxford [England] : Clarendon Press; New York : Oxford University Press. ISBN 978-0-1982-4966-5.
- Stimson, Frederic J. (1908). The American Constitution: The National Powers, the Rights of the States, the Liberties of the People. New York, Charles Scribner's Sons. (Lowell Institute lectures, delivered at Boston, October–November 1907)
- —— (1908). The law of the federal and state constitutions of the United States, with an historical study of their principles. Boston Book Company.
- —— (1928). The American Constitution as it protects private rights. New York: Charles Scribner's Sons.
- Spurlin, Paul Merrill (1969). Montesquieu in America, 1760-1801. New York: Octagon Books. "Key words: James Madison, Spirit of Laws, Constitution"
- Stokes, Anson Phelps (1950). Church and state in the United States. Vol. I. New York, Harper.
- —— (1950). Church and state in the United States. Vol. II. New York, Harper.
- —— (1950). Church and state in the United States. Vol. III. New York, Harper.
- Storing, Herbert J.; Dry, Murray (1981). The Complete anti-Federalist. Vol. II. University of Chicago Press. ISBN 978-0-2267-7576-0. "A seven volume work"
- Sutherland, Arthur E. (1965). Constitutionalism in America: origin and evolution of its fundamental ideas. New York: Blaisdell.
- Swindler, William Finley (1969). Court and Constitution in the twentieth century. Indianapolis: Bobbs-Merrill. ISBN 978-0-6725-1873-7.
- Swisher, Carl Brent (1946). The growth of constitutional power in the United States. University of Chicago Press.
- —— (1954). American constitutional development. Boston: Houghton Mifflin.
- Taylor, Hannis (1911). The origin and growth of the American Constitution. Boston and New York: Houghton Mifflin Company. "An historical treatise in which the documentary evidence as to the making of the entirely new plan of federal government embodied in the existing Constitution of the United States, is, for the first time, set forth as a complete and consistent whole"
- Thorpe, Francis Newton (1891). The story of the Constitution of the United States. New York: Chautauqua Press.
- —— (1911). The Constitutional History of the United States, 1861-1895 (in three volumes). Vol. II. Chicago: Callahan & Company.
- —— (1901). The Constitutional History of the United States, 1861-1895 (in three volumes). Vol. II. Chicago: Callahan & Company.
- —— (1901). The Constitutional History of the United States, 1861-1895 (in three volumes). Vol. III. Chicago: Callahan & Company.
- Tribe, Laurence H. (1991). On reading the Constitution. Harvard University Press. ISBN 978-0-6746-36262.
- Tugwell, Rexford G. (1974). The emerging Constitution. New York: Harper's Magazine Press. ISBN 978-0-0612-8225-6.
- Van Doren, Carl (1948). The great rehearsal: the story of the making and ratifying of the Constitution of the United States. New York: Viking Press.
- Vaughan, Harold Cecil (1971). The Constitutional Convention, 1787: the beginning of Federal Government in America. New York; London: Franklin Watts. ISBN 978-0-5310-1104-1.
- Vile, John R. (1997). A companion to the United States Constitution and its amendments. Westport, Conn.: Praeger. ISBN 978-0-2759-8932-3.
- Vile, Maurice J. (1967). Constitutionalism and the separation of powers. Oxford : Clarendon Press.
- Vose, Clement E (1981) [1972]. Constitutional change: amendment politics and Supreme Court litigation since 1900. Lexington, Massachusetts: Lexington Books. ISBN 978-0-5270-2785-8.
- Warren, Charles (1928). The Making of the Constitution. Boston: Little, Brown, and Company.
- Watson, David Kemper (1910). The Constitution of the United States, its history application and construction. Vol. I. Chicago, Callaghan.
- —— (1910). The Constitution of the United States, its history application and construction. Vol. II. Chicago, Callaghan.
- West, Henry Litchfield (1918). Federal power: its growth and necessity. New York: George H. Doran Company.
- Wheeler, Russel R. (1986). The writing and ratification of the U.S. Constitution: a bibliography. Washington, D.C.: Federal Judicial Center.
- White, Leonard Dupee (1948). The Federalists;: A study in administrative history. New York: The Macmillan Company.
- White, Morton (1987). Philosophy, the Federalist, and the Constitution. Oxford University Press. ISBN 978-0-1950-5948-9.
- Whittington, Keith E. (1999). Constitutional Interpretation: Textual Meaning, Original Intent, and Judicial Review. Lawrence, KS: University Press of Kansas. ISBN 0-7006-0969-5.
- Wiecek, William (1972). The Guarantee Clause of the U.S. Constitution. Ithaca, NY: Cornell University Press. ISBN 978-0-8014-0671-3.
- Wildavsky, Aaron B (1967). American federalism in perspective. Boston: Little, Brown.
- Wilbur, William Hale (1983). George Washington, architect of the Constitution. Daytona Beach, Florida: Patriotic Education. ISBN 0-9-12530146.
- Williams, Jerre Stockton (1979). Constitutional analysis in a nutshell. St. Paul, Minnesota: West Publishing Company. ISBN 978-0-8299-2022-2.
- Willoughby, Westel Woodbury (1904). The American constitutional system; an introduction to the study of the American state. New York: The Century Co. ". . . there will be described in detail the manner in which the governmental agencies of this country — federal, state, and local — are organized and operated. The aim of the present essay is to prepare the way for this descriptive work by disclosing the constitutional character of the American State. . ."
- —— (1910). The constitutional law of the United States. Vol. I. New York: Baker, Voorhis & Company.
- —— (1910). The constitutional law of the United States. Vol. II. New York: Baker, Voorhis & Company.
- Wills, Garry (1985). George Washington and the Enlightenment. London: Robert Hale Publishers. ISBN 978-0-3851-7562-3.
- Wood, Gordon S. (1979). The Confederation and the Constitution: The Critical Issues. Washington, DC: University Press of America. ISBN 978-0819-10821-0.
- —— (1969). The Creation of the American Republic, 1776-1787. University of North Carolina Press. ISBN 978-0-8078-4723-7.
- —— (1987). The Making of the Constitution. Baylor University Press. ISBN 978-0-9189-54497.
- Wright, Benjamin Fletcher (1938). The Contract Clause Of The Constitution. Harvard University Press.
- —— (1946). The growth of American constitutional law. New York: Henry Holt & Company, Inc. ISBN 978-0-3132-2951-0.
- —— (1962). American interpretations of natural law, a study in the history of political thought. New York: Russell & Russell. ISBN 978-0-72227-5306.
- —— (1967). Consensus and continuity, 1776-1787. New York: W. W. Norton & Company, Inc. ISBN 978-0-3132-2951-0.
- Wright, Robert K. Jr. (1987). Soldier-statesmen of the Constitution. Washington, D.C.: Center of Military History, U.S. Army. ISBN 978-1-41021-4799.
- Young, Alfred Fabian (1965). The debate over the Constitution, 1787-1789. Chicago: Rand McNally.
Top

=== Journals 2 ===
- Ackerman, Bruce (December 1989). "Constitutional Politics/Constitutional Law". The Yale Law Journal. 99 (3). The Yale Law Journal Co., Inc.: 453–547. doi:10.2307/796754. JSTOR 796754.
- ——; Katyal, Neal (Spring 1995). "Our Unconventional Founding". The University of Chicago Law Review. 62 (2). Publisher:The University of Chicago Law Review: 475–573. doi:10.2307/1600145. JSTOR 1600145.
- Adair, Douglas (April 1944). "The Authorship of the Disputed Federalist Papers". The William and Mary Quarterly. 1 (2). Omohundro Institute of Early American History and Culture: 97–122. doi:10.2307/1921883. JSTOR 1921883.
- —— (August 1957). ""That Politics May Be Reduced to a Science": David Hume, James Madison, and the Tenth Federalist". Huntington Library Quarterly. 20 (4). University of Pennsylvania Press: 343–360. doi:10.2307/3816276. JSTOR 3816276.
- Adjei, Cyril (January 1995). "Human Rights Theory and the Bill of Rights Debate". The Modern Law Review. 58 (1): 17–36. doi:10.1111/j.1468-2230.1995.tb01992.x. JSTOR 1096369.
- Aldrich, John H.; Grant, Ruth W. (May 1993). "The Antifederalists, the First Congress, and the First Parties". The Journal of Politics. 65 (2). The University of Chicago Press on behalf of the Southern Political Science Association: 295–326. doi:10.2307/2132267. JSTOR 2132267. S2CID 154830618.
- Allan, T. R. S. (Winter 1991). "Constitutional Rights and Common Law". Oxford Journal of Legal Studies. 11 (4). Oxford University Press: 453–480. doi:10.1093/ojls/11.4.453. JSTOR 764447.
- Alschuler, Albert (1994). "Sir William Blackstone and the shaping of American law". New Law Journal. 144 (6653). ISSN 0306-6479.
- Amar, Akhil Reed (June 1987). "Of Sovereignty and Federalism". The Yale Law Journal. 96 (7). The Yale Law Journal Company, Inc.: 1425–1520. doi:10.2307/796493. JSTOR 796493.
- —— (March 1991). "The Bill of Rights as a Constitution". The Yale Law Journal. 100 (5). The Yale Law Journal Company, Inc.: 1131–1210. doi:10.2307/796690. JSTOR 796690.
- —— (April 1992). "The Bill of Rights and the Fourteenth Amendment". The Yale Law Journal. 101 (6). The Yale Law Journal Company, Inc.: 1193–1284. doi:10.2307/796923. JSTOR 796923.
- —— (March 1994). "The Consent of the Governed: Constitutional Amendment outside Article V". Columbia Law Review. 94 (2). Columbia Law Review Association, Inc.: 457–508. doi:10.2307/1123201. JSTOR 1123201.
- Ames, Herman (1924). "The Amending Provision of the Federal Constitution in Practice". Proceedings of the American Philosophical Society. 63 (1). American Philosophical Society: 62–75. JSTOR 984442.
- Ames, R. A.; Montgomery, H. C. (October 1934). "The Influence of Rome on the American Constitution". The Classical Journal. 30 (1). The Classical Association of the Middle West and South: 19–27. JSTOR 3290141.
- Bailyn, Bernard (January 1962). "Political Experience and Enlightenment Ideas in Eighteenth-Century America". The American Historical Review. 67 (2). Oxford University Press: 339–351. doi:10.2307/1843427. JSTOR 1843427.
- Beach, Arthur O'Neal (July 1969). "Constitutional Revision-Constitutional Amendment Process". Natural Resources Journal. 9 (3). Regents of the University of New Mexico: 422–429. JSTOR 24879937.
- Bebout, John E. (January 1967). "Organizing the Constitutional Convention". Proceedings of the Academy of Political Science. 28 (3): 22–35. doi:10.2307/1173139. JSTOR 1173139.
- Benton, William A. (October 1964). "Pennsylvania Revolutionary Officers and the Federal Constitution". Pennsylvania History: A Journal of Mid-Atlantic Studies. 31 (3). Pennsylvania State University Press: 419–435. JSTOR 27770289.
- Bernstein, David (November 1987). "The Constitutional Convention: Facts and Figures". The History Teacher. 21 (1). Society for History Education: 11–19. doi:10.2307/492799. JSTOR 492799.
- Bloch, Ruth H. (July 1987). "The Constitution and Culture". The William and Mary Quarterly. 44 (3). Omohundro Institute of Early American History and Culture: 550–555. doi:10.2307/1939771. JSTOR 1939771.
- Bradley, Harold W. (November 1945). "The Political Thinking of George Washington". The Journal of Southern History. 11 (4). Southern Historical Association: 469–486. doi:10.2307/2198308. JSTOR 2198308.
- Brant, Irving (January 1951). "Madison: On the Separation of Church and State". The William and Mary Quarterly. 8 (1). Omohundro Institute of Early American History and Culture: 3–24. doi:10.2307/1920731. JSTOR 1920731.
- Bonfield, Arthur Earl (March 1968). "The Dirksen Amendment and the Article V Convention Process". Michigan Law Review. 66 (5). Michigan Law Review Association, Inc.: 949–1000. doi:10.2307/1287188. JSTOR 1287188. S2CID 154226726.
- Borden, Morton (August 1979). "Federalists, Antifederalists, and Religious Freedom". Journal of Church and State. 21 (3). Oxford University Press: 469–482. doi:10.1093/jcs/21.3.469. JSTOR 23915938.
- Boyd, Steven R. (Spring 1979). "Antifederalists and the Acceptance of the Constitution: Pennsylvania, 1787-1792". Publius. 9 (2). Oxford University Press: 123–137. JSTOR 3329737.
- Brooks, Robin (July 1967). "Alexander Hamilton, Melancton Smith, and the Ratification of the Constitution in New York". The William and Mary Quarterly. 24 (3). Omohundro Institute of Early American History and Culture: 339–358. doi:10.2307/1920872. JSTOR 1920872.
- Buford, Edward P. (September 1923). "Federal Encroachments upon State Sovereignty". The Virginia Law Register. 9 (5). Virginia Law Review: 321–344. doi:10.2307/1108562. JSTOR 1108562.
- Calabresi, Steven G.; Rhodes, Kevin H. (April 1992). "The Structural Constitution: Unitary Executive, Plural Judiciary". The Harvard Law Review. 105 (6). The Harvard Law Review Association: 1153–1216. doi:10.2307/1341727. JSTOR 1341727.
- Caldwell, Lynton K. (Spring 1944). "Alexander Hamilton: Advocate of Executive Leadership". Public Administration Review. 4 (2). Wiley on behalf of the American Society for Public Administration: 113–126. doi:10.2307/972672. JSTOR 972672.
- Carroll, Thomas F. (June 1919). "Freedom of Speech and of the Press in War Time: The Espionage Act". Michigan Law Review. 17 (8). The Michigan Law Review Association: 621–665. doi:10.2307/1277922. JSTOR 1277922.
- Carter, Edward W.; Rohlfing, Charles C. (May 1936). "The Constitution of the United States-A Bibliography". The Annals of the American Academy of Political and Social Science. 185. Sage Publications, Inc.: University of Utah: 190–200. doi:10.1177/000271623618500123. JSTOR 1019283. S2CID 144431520.
- Chafee, Zechariah Jr. (June 1919). "Freedom of Speech in War Time". Harvard Law Review. 32 (8). The Harvard Law Review Association: 932–973. doi:10.2307/1327107. JSTOR 1327107.
- Cohen, Joshua (Summer 1993). "Freedom of Expression". Philosophy & Public Affairs. 22 (3). Wiley: 207–263. JSTOR 2265305.
- Corwin, Edward S. (April 1925). "The Progress of Constitutional Theory Between the Declaration of Independence and the Meeting of the Philadelphia Convention". The American Historical Review. 30 (3). Oxford University Press on behalf of the American Historical Association: 511–536. doi:10.2307/1835579. JSTOR 1835579.
- —— (February 1914). "The Basic Doctrine of American Constitutional Law". Michigan Law Review. 12 (4). The Michigan Law Review Association: 247–276. doi:10.2307/1276027. JSTOR 1276027.
- —— (December 1936). "The Constitution as Instrument and as Symbol". The American Political Science Review. 3 (6). American Political Science Association: 1071–1085. doi:10.2307/1948289. JSTOR 1948289. S2CID 144459500.
- —— (August 31, 1956). "Franklin and the Constitution". Proceedings of the American Philosophical Society. 100 (4). American Philosophical Society: 283–288. JSTOR 3143753.
- Cress, Lawrence Delbert (October 1975). "Whither Columbia? Congressional Residence and the Politics of the New Nation, 1776 to 1787". The William and Mary Quarterly. 32 (4). Omohundro Institute of Early American History and Culture: 581–600. doi:10.2307/1919555. JSTOR 1919555.
- Currie, David P. (Autumn 1984). "The Constitution in the Supreme Court: 1789-1801". The University of Chicago Law Review. 48 (4). Publisher: The University of Chicago Law Review: 819–885. doi:10.2307/1599296. JSTOR 1599296.
- —— (Spring 1985). "The Constitution in the Supreme Court: The Protection of Economic Interests, 1889-1910". The University of Chicago Law Review. 52 (2). Publisher: The University of Chicago Law Review: 324–388. doi:10.2307/1599663. JSTOR 1599663.
- —— (Autumn 1985). "The Constitution in the Supreme Court: Full Faith and the Bill of Rights, 1889-1910". The University of Chicago Law Review. 52 (4). Publisher: The University of Chicago Law Review: 867–902. doi:10.2307/1599519. JSTOR 1599519.
- —— (February 1986). "The Constitution in the Supreme Court: 1921-1930". Duke Law Journal. 1986 (1). Duke University School of Law: 65–144. doi:10.2307/1372446. JSTOR 1372446.
- —— (Spring 1987). "The Constitution in the Supreme Court: The New Deal, 1931-1940". The University of Chicago Law Review. 54 (2). Publisher: The University of Chicago Law Review: 504–555. doi:10.2307/1599798. JSTOR 1599798.
- —— (Summer 1982). "The Constitution in the Supreme Court: The Powers of the Federal Courts, 1801-1835". The University of Chicago Law Review. 49 (3). Publisher: The University of Chicago Law Review: 646–724. doi:10.2307/1599307. JSTOR 1599307.
- Dellinger, Walter (December 1983). "The Legitimacy of Constitutional Change: Rethinking the Amendment Process". Harvard Law Review. 97 (2). The Harvard Law Review Association: 386–432. doi:10.2307/1340852. JSTOR 340852.
- Diamond, Martin (March 1959). "Democracy and the Federalist: A Reconsideration of the Framers' Intent". The American Political Science Review. 53 (1). American Political Science Association: 52–68. doi:10.2307/1951730. JSTOR 1951730. S2CID 145527478.
- DiClerico, Robert E. (Spring 1987). "James Wilson's Presidency". Presidential Studies Quarterly. 17 (2). Center for the Study of the Presidency and Congress: 301–317. JSTOR 40574453.
- Dodd, W. F. (February 1921). "Amending the Federal Constitution". The Yale Law Journal. 30 (4). The Yale Law Journal Co. Inc.: 321–354. doi:10.2307/787395. JSTOR 787395.
- Duniway, Clyde Augustus (January 1904). "French Influence on the Adoption of the Federal Constitution". The American Historical Review. 9 (2). Oxford University Press on behalf of the American Historical Association: 304–309. doi:10.2307/1833368. JSTOR 1833368.
- Eliel, Richard H. (November 1924). "Freedom of Speech". The American Political Science Review. 18 (4). American Political Science Association: 712–736. doi:10.2307/1943668. JSTOR 1943668. S2CID 146207858.
- Emerson, Thomas I. (November 1964). "Freedom of Association and Freedom of Expression". The Yale Law Journal. 74 (1). The Yale Law Journal Company, Inc.: 1–35. doi:10.2307/794804. JSTOR 794804.
- Eye, Glen G. (May–June 1975). "We The People". The Journal of Educational Research. 68 (5). Taylor & Francis, Ltd.: 341–346. doi:10.1080/00220671.1975.10884793. JSTOR 27536779.
- Fairlie, John A. (February 1923). "The Separation of Powers". Michigan Law Review. 21 (4). The Michigan Law Review Association.: 393–436. doi:10.2307/1277683. JSTOR 1277683.
- Farrand, Max (1904). "Compromises of the Constitution". The American Historical Review. 9 (3): 479–489. doi:10.2307/1833471. JSTOR 1833471.
- —— (October 1901). "The Records of the Federal Convention". The American Historical Review. 13 (1). Oxford University Press on behalf of the American Historical Association: 44–65. doi:10.2307/1834886. JSTOR 1834886.
- —— (November 1908). "The Federal Constitution and the Defects of The Confederation". The American Political Science Review. 2 (4). American Political Science Association: 532–544. doi:10.2307/1944478. JSTOR 1944478. S2CID 145377684.
- Feer, Robert A. (September 1969). "Shays's Rebellion and the Constitution: A Study in Causation". The New England Quarterly. 42 (3). The New England Quarterly, Inc.: 388–410. doi:10.2307/363616. JSTOR 363616.
- Folsom, Victor C. (Fall 1977). "Constitutional Development in the Countries of the Americas". Lawyer of the Americas. 9 (3). University of Miami Inter-American Law Review: 495–508. JSTOR 40175779.
- Galston, Miriam; Galston, William A. (1994). "Reason, Consent, and the U.S. Constitution: Bruce Ackerman's 'We the People'". Ethics. 104 (3): 446–466. doi:10.1086/293624. JSTOR 2381973. S2CID 159489495.
- Garver, Frank Harmon (June 1932). "The Transition from the Continental Congress to the Congress of the Confederation". Pacific Historical Review. 1 (2). University of California Press: 221–234. doi:10.2307/3633693. JSTOR 3633693.
- Gerber, Scott D. (Summer 1996). "Roger Sherman and the Bill of Rights". Polity. 28 (4). The University of Chicago Press on behalf of the Northeastern Political Science Association: 521–540. doi:10.2307/3235344. JSTOR 235344. S2CID 155556253.
- Glenn, Gary D. (Summer 1987). "Forgotten Purposes of the First Amendment Religion Clauses". The Review of Politics. 49 (3). Cambridge University Press for the University of Notre Dame: 340–367. doi:10.1017/S0034670500034446. JSTOR 1407840. S2CID 144467451.
- Goebel, Julius Jr. (April 1938). "Constitutional History and Constitutional Law". Columbia Law Review. 38 (4). Columbia Law Review Association, Inc.: 555–557. doi:10.2307/1116430. JSTOR 1116430.
- Gotchy, Joseph R. (Summer 1994). "Federalists and Anti-Federalists: Is a Bill of Rights Essential to a Free Society?". OAH Magazine of History. 8 (4). Oxford University Press: 45–48. doi:10.1093/maghis/8.4.45. JSTOR 25162986.
- Greenawalt, Kent (January 1989). "Free Speech Justifications" (PDF). Columbia Law Review. 89 (1). Columbia Law Review Association, Inc.: 119–155. doi:10.2307/1122730. JSTOR 1122730. "Freedom of Speech"
- Greene, Jack P. (Autumn 1982). "The Background of the Articles of Confederation". Publius. 12 (4). Oxford University Press: 15–44. doi:10.1093/oxfordjournals.pubjof.a037409. JSTOR 3329661.
- Griffith, J.A.G. (January 1979). "The Political Constitution". The Modern Law Review. 42 (1). Wiley on behalf of the Modern Law Review: 1–21. doi:10.1111/j.1468-2230.1979.tb01506.x. JSTOR 1095629.
- Grinde, Donald A. Jr. (Spring 1995). "The Iroquois and the Development of American Government". Historical Reflections. 21 (2). Berghahn Books: 301–318. JSTOR 41299029.
- Grinde, Donald A.; Johansen, Bruce E. (July 1996). "Sauce for the Goose: Demand and Definitions for 'Proof' Regarding the Iroquois and Democracy". The William and Mary Quarterly. 53 (3). Omohundro Institute of Early American History and Culture.: 621–636. doi:10.2307/2947208. JSTOR 2947208.
- Gummere, Richard M. (Spring 1962). "The Classical Ancestry of the United States Constitution". American Quarterly. 14 (1). Lowell Institute, Boston: 3–18. doi:10.2307/2710223. JSTOR 2710223.
- Hale, Robert Lee (March 1951). "Some Basic Constitutional Rights of Economic Significance". Columbia Law Review. 51 (3). Columbia Law Review Association, Inc.: 271–326. doi:10.2307/1119286. JSTOR 1119286.
- —— (March 1935). "Unconstitutional Conditions and Constitutional Rights". Columbia Law Review. 35 (3). Columbia Law Review Association, Inc.: 321–359. doi:10.2307/1116396. JSTOR 1116396.
- —— (April 1944). "The Supreme Court and the Contract Clause". Harvard Law Review. 57 (4). The Harvard Law Review Association: 512–557. doi:10.2307/1334662. JSTOR 1334662.
- Hajdu, Robert; Rosenblum, Bruce E. (January 1979). "The Process of Constitutional Amendment". Columbia Law Review. 79 (1). Columbia Law Review Association: 106–172. doi:10.2307/1122054. JSTOR 1122054.
- Harlan, John M. (October 1964). "The Bill of Rights and the Constitution". American Bar Association Journal. 50 (10). Publisher:American Bar Association: 918–920. JSTOR 25722963.
- Haw, James (October 1993). "The Rutledges, the Continental Congress, and Independence". The South Carolina Historical Magazine. 94 (4). South Carolina Historical Society: 232–251. JSTOR 27569960.
- Hazeltine, H. D. (January 1917). "The Influence of Magna Carta on American Constitutional Development". Columbia Law Review. 17 (1). Columbia Law Review Association, Inc.: 1–33. doi:10.2307/1110845. JSTOR 1110845.
- Hazo, Robert G. (July 1968). "Montesquieu and the Separation of Powers". American Bar Association Journal. 54 (7). Publisher:American Bar Association: 665–668. JSTOR 25724465=.
- Heady, Ferrel (February 1987). "American Constitutional and Administrative Systems in Comparative Perspective". Public Administration Review. 47 (1): 9–16. doi:10.2307/975467. JSTOR 975467.
- Henkin, Louis (September 1987). "The United States Constitution as Social Compact". Proceedings of the American Philosophical Society. 71 (3). American Philosophical Society: 261–269. JSTOR 987021.
- Higgins, Henry Bournes (June 1905). "The Rigid Constitution". Political Science Quarterly. 20 (2). Oxford University Press: 203–222. doi:10.2307/2140397. JSTOR 2140397.
- Hobson, Charles F. (April 1979). "The Negative on State Laws: James Madison, the Constitution, and the Crisis of Republican Government". The William and Mary Quarterly. 36 (2). Omohundro Institute of Early American History and Culture: 215–235. doi:10.2307/1922265. JSTOR 1922265.
- Hoff, Samuel B. (Fall 1987). "A Bicentennial Assessment of Hamilton's Energetic Executive". Presidential Studies Quarterly. 17 (4). Center for the Study of the Presidency and Congress: 725–739. JSTOR 27550481.
- Hoskins, Richard J. (1984). "The Original Separation of Church and State in America". Journal of Law and Religion. 2 (2). Cambridge University Press: 221–239. doi:10.2307/1051090. JSTOR 1051090. S2CID 163919297.
- Howe, Daniel W. (July 1987). "The Political Psychology of The Federalist". The William and Mary Quarterly. 44 (3). Omohundro Institute of Early American History and Culture: 485–509. doi:10.2307/1939767. JSTOR 1939767. PMID 11618299. "Key words: Enlightenment, Publius Montesquieu"
- —— (July 1989). "Why the Scottish Enlightenment Was Useful to the Framers of the American Constitution". Comparative Studies in Society and History. 31 (3). Cambridge University Press: 572–587. doi:10.1017/S0010417500016042. JSTOR 178771. S2CID 143686208.
- Howell, Herbert A. (November 1917). "The Law of Treason". Virginia Law Review. 5 (2): 131–134. doi:10.2307/1064036. JSTOR 1064036.
- Hoxie, R. Gordon (Winter 1985). "The Presidency in the Constitutional Convention". Presidential Studies Quarterly. 15 (1). Wiley on behalf of the Center for the Study of the Presidency and Congress: 25–32. JSTOR 27550162.
- Hueston, John C. (December 1990). "Altering the Course of the Constitutional Convention: The Role of the Committee of Detail in Establishing the Balance of State and Federal Powers". The Yale Law Journal. 100 (3). The Yale Law Journal Company, Inc.: 765–783. doi:10.2307/796670. JSTOR 796670.
- Huq, Aziz Z. (April 2014). "The Function of Article V". University of Pennsylvania Law Review. 162 (5). Publisher:The University of Pennsylvania Law Review: 1165–1236. JSTOR 24247878.
- Hurst, James Willard (December 1944). "Treason in the United States? I. Treason down to the Constitution". Harvard Law Review. 58 (2). The Harvard Law Review Association: 226–272. doi:10.2307/1335359. JSTOR 1335359.
- —— (February 1945). "Treason in the United States: II. The Constitution". Harvard Law Review. 58 (3). The Harvard Law Review Association: 395–344. doi:10.2307/1335427. JSTOR 1335427.
- Hutson, James H. (Winter 1980). "Pierce Butler's Records of the Federal Constitutional Convention". The Quarterly Journal of the Library of Congress. 37 (1). Library of Congress: 64–73. JSTOR 29781839.
- —— (July 1981). "Country, Court, and Constitution: Antifederalism and the Historians". The William and Mary Quarterly. 38 (3). Omohundro Institute of Early American History and Culture: 337–368. doi:10.2307/1921952. JSTOR 1921952.
- —— (December 1984). "The Creation of the Constitution: Scholarship at a Standstill". Reviews in American History. 12 (4). The Johns Hopkins University Press: 463–477. doi:10.2307/2701897. JSTOR 2701897.
- —— (July 1987). "Riddles of the Federal Constitutional Convention". The William and Mary Quarterly. 44 (3). Omohundro Institute of Early American History and Culture: 411–423. doi:10.2307/1939764. JSTOR 1939764.
- Jackson, William (May 1936). "The Constitution of the United States of America". The Annals of the American Academy of Political and Social Science. 185. Sage Publications, Inc. : University of Utah: 201–211. doi:10.1177/000271623618500124. JSTOR 1019284. S2CID 220846843.
- Jenkins, Erik M. (1990). "The Imaginary Connection between the Great Law of Peace and the United States Constitution: A Reply to Professor Schaaf". American Indian Law Review. 15 (2): 295–308. doi:10.2307/20068679. JSTOR 20068679. S2CID 155311419.
- —— (June 1937). "The Articles of Confederation: A Re-Interpretation". Pacific Historical Review. 6 (2). University of California Press: 120–142. doi:10.2307/3633159. JSTOR 3633159.
- Jensen, Merrill (September 1943). "The Idea of a National Government During the American Revolution". Political Science Quarterly. 58 (3). Oxford University Press: 356–379. doi:10.2307/2144490. JSTOR 2144490.
- Jillson, Calvin C.; Eubanks, Cecil L. (September 1981). "The Political Structure of Constitution Making: The Federal Convention of 1787". The American Political Science Review. 75 (3). American Political Science Association: 598–612. doi:10.2307/1960955. JSTOR 1960955. S2CID 147196894.
- Kenyon, Cecelia M. (January 1955). "Men of Little Faith: The Anti-Federalists on the Nature of Representative Government". The William and Mary Quarterly. 12 (1). Omohundro Institute of Early American History and Culture: 3–43. doi:10.2307/1923094. JSTOR 1923094.
- Klein, Milton M. (1995). "Mythologizing the U.S. Constitution". Soundings: An Interdisciplinary Journal. 78 (1): 169–187. JSTOR 41178693.
- Kim, Richard C. C. (Autumn 1964). "The Constitution, the Supreme Court, and Religious Liberty". Journal of Church and State. 6 (3). Oxford University Press: 333–343. doi:10.1093/jcs/6.3.333. JSTOR 23914021.
- Kirk, Russell (September 1990). "The Rights of Man vs. The Bill of Rights". Presidential Studies Quarterly. 20 (3). Center for the Study of the Presidency and Congress.: 490–501. JSTOR 40574530.
- Klinglesmith, Margaret Center (May 1925). "Amending the Constitution of the United States". University of Pennsylvania Law Review and American Law Register. 73 (4). University of Pennsylvania: 355–379. doi:10.2307/3314185. JSTOR 3314185.
- Koch, Adrienne (July 1961). "Pragmatic Wisdom and the American Enlightenment". The William and Mary Quarterly. 18 (3). Omohundro Institute of Early American History and Culture: 313–329. doi:10.2307/1921168. JSTOR 1921168. (Note: Covers how the American enlightenment influenced the forging of the Constitution, with emphaisis on Benjamin Franklin's views.)
- Koritansky, John C. (Spring 1979). "Alexander Hamilton's Philosophy of Government and Administration". Publius. 9 (2). Oxford University Press: 99–122. JSTOR 3329736.
- Leek, J. H. (November 1951). "Treason and the Constitution". The Journal of Politics. 13 (4). The University of Chicago Press on behalf of the Southern Political Science Association: 604–622. doi:10.2307/2126318. JSTOR 2126318. S2CID 154581608.
- Levi, Edward H. Levi (April 1976). "Some Aspects of Separation of Powers". Columbia Law Review. 76 (3). Columbia Law Review Association: 371–391. doi:10.2307/1121549. JSTOR 1121549.
- Levy, Philip A. (July 1996). "Exemplars of Taking Liberties: The Iroquois Influence Thesis and the Problem of Evidence". The Omohundro Institute of Early American History and Culture. 53 (3). Omohundro Institute of Early American History and Culture: 588–604. doi:10.2307/2947206. JSTOR 2947206. S2CID 146842153.
- Lienesch (Spring 1983). "In defence of the Antifederalists". History of Political Thought. 4 (1). Imprint Academic Ltd.: 65–87. JSTOR 26212367.
- Long, Joe R. (January 1918). "The Freedom of the Press". Virginia Law Review. 5 (4). Publisher: Virginia Law Review: 225–246. doi:10.2307/1063583. JSTOR 1063583.
- Ludwikowski, Rett R. (1990). "The French Declaration of the Rights of Man and Citizen and the American Constitutional Development". The American Journal of Comparative Law. 38. Oxford University Press: 445–462. doi:10.2307/840552. JSTOR 840552. S2CID 143656851.
- Lutz, Donald S. (1989). "Inventing We the People: The Rise of Popular Sovereignty in England and America (review, Edmund S. Morgan book)". The William and Mary Quarterly. 46 (3): 596–601. doi:10.2307/1922360. JSTOR 1922360.
- —— (Winter 1990). "The Articles of Confederation as the Background to the Federal Republic". Publius. 20 (1). Oxford University Press: 55–70. doi:10.1093/oxfordjournals.pubjof.a037862. JSTOR 3330362.
- —— (June 1994). "Toward a Theory of Constitutional Amendment". The American Political Science Review. 88 (2). American Political Science Association: 355–370. doi:10.2307/2944709. JSTOR 2944709. S2CID 144713465.
- —— (Spring 1998). "The Iroquois Confederation Constitution: An Analysis". Publius. 28 (2). Oxford University Press: 99–127. doi:10.1093/oxfordjournals.pubjof.a029971. JSTOR 3331052.
- Lynd, Staughton (April 1963). "Abraham Yates's History of the Movement for the United States Constitution". The William and Mary Quarterly. 20 (2). Omohundro Institute of Early American History and Culture: 223–245. doi:10.2307/1919298. JSTOR 1919298.
- —— (June 1966). "The Compromise of 1787". Political Science Quarterly. 81 (2). Oxford University Press: 225–250. doi:10.2307/2147971. JSTOR 2147971.
- Main, Jackson Turner (July 1987). "An Agenda for Research on the Origins and Nature of the Constitution of 1787-1788". The William and Mary Quarterly. 44 (3). Omohundro Institute of Early American History and Culture: 591–596. doi:10.2307/1939777. JSTOR 1939777.
- Maletz, Donald J. (Winter 1998). "The Union as Idea: Tocqueville on the American Constitution". History of Political Thought. 19 (4). Imprint Academic Ltd.: 599–620. JSTOR 26217526. (Note: Alexis de Tocqueville is best known for his two-volume work, Democracy in America (1835) and The Old Regime and the Revolution (1856).)
- Mann, W. Howard (October 1955). "Security and the Constitution". Current History. 29 (170). University of California Press: 236–246. doi:10.1525/curh.1955.29.170.236. JSTOR 45309051. S2CID 147419551.
- Manning, John F. (April 1996). "Constitutional Structure and Judicial Deference to Agency Interpretations of Agency Rules". Columbia Law Review. 96 (3). Columbia Law Review Association, Inc.: 612–696. doi:10.2307/1123259. JSTOR 1123259.
- Marsh, Esbon (Spring 1941). "The First Session of the Second Continental Congress". The Historian. 3 (2). Taylor & Francis, Ltd.: 181–194. doi:10.1111/j.1540-6563.1941.tb00537.x. JSTOR 24435926.
- Martig, Ralph R. (June 1937). "Amending the Constitution Article Five: The Keystone of the Arch". Michigan Law Review. 35 (8). Michigan Law Review Association, Inc.: 1253–1285. doi:10.2307/1281642. JSTOR 1281642.
- Martin, Philip L. (December 1970). "The Application Clause of Article Five". Political Science Quarterly. 85 (4). Oxford University Press: 616–628. doi:10.2307/2147599. JSTOR 2147599.
- Mathews, L. K. (August 1914). "Benjamin Franklin's Plans for a Colonial Union, 1750-1775". The American Political Science Review. 8 (3). American Political Science Association: 393–412. doi:10.2307/1946173. JSTOR 1946173. S2CID 147320261.
- May, Henry F. (Winter 1970). "The Problem of the American Enlightenment". New Literary History. 1 (2). The Johns Hopkins University Press: 201–214. doi:10.2307/468628. JSTOR 468628.
- McCarthy, Daniel J. (Fall 1987). "James Wilson and the Creation of the Presidency". Presidential Studies Quarterly. 17 (4). Center for the Study of the Presidency and Congress: 689–696. JSTOR 27550478.
- McConnell, Michael W.; Posner, Richard A. (Winter 1989). "An Economic Approach to Issues of Religious Freedom". The University of Chicago Law Review. 55 (1). Publisher: The University of Chicago Law Review: 1–60. doi:10.2307/1599686. JSTOR 1599686.
- —— (Winter 1992). "Religious Freedom at a Crossroads". The University of Chicago Law Review. 59 (1). Publisher: University of Chicago Law Review: 115–194. doi:10.2307/1599935. JSTOR 1599935.
- McDonald, Forrest (Spring 1963). "The Anti-Federalists, 1781-1789". The Wisconsin Magazine of History. 46 (3). Wisconsin Historical Society: 3–43. JSTOR 4633851.
- McGuire, Robert L. O. (March 1986). "An Economic Model of Voting Behavior over Specific Issues at the Constitutional Convention of 1787". The Journal of Economic History. 46 (1). Cambridge University Press: 79–111. doi:10.1017/S0022050700045514. JSTOR 2121268. S2CID 154949246.
- McGuire, Robert A. (May 1998). "Constitution Making: A Rational Choice Model of the Federal Convention of 1787". American Journal of Political Science. 32 (2). Midwest Political Science Association: 483–522. doi:10.2307/2111133. JSTOR 2111133.
- McKinney, Hayes (March 1918). "Treason under the Constitution of the United States". The Virginia Law Register. New Series. 3 (11). Virginia Law Review: 801–826. doi:10.2307/1107289. JSTOR 1107289.
- Merrill, Thomas W. (1991). "The Constitutional Principle of Separation of Powers" (PDF). The Supreme Court Review. 1991. The University of Chicago Press: 225–260. doi:10.1086/scr.1991.3109603. JSTOR 3109603. S2CID 147690997.
- Meyer, D. H. (Summer 1976). "The Uniqueness of the American Enlightenment". American Quarterly. 28 (2). The Johns Hopkins University Press: 165–186. doi:10.2307/2712348. JSTOR 2712348. "The Federalist serves as an illustration of the American assimilation of Enlightenment thinking"
- Miller, Joshua (February 1968). "The Ghostly Body Politic: The Federalist Papers and Popular Sovereignty". Political Theory. 16 (1). Sage Publications, Inc.: University of Utah: 99–119. doi:10.1177/0090591788016001006. JSTOR 191649. S2CID 144249503.
- Miller, Robert J. (1993). "American Indian Influence on the United States Constitution and Its Framers". American Indian Law Review. 18 (1): 133–160. doi:10.2307/20068736. JSTOR 20068736.
- Mitchell, Broadus (Spring 1987). "Alexander Hamilton, Executive Power and the New Nation". Presidential Studies Quarterly. 17 (2). Center for the Study of the Presidency and Congress: 329–343. JSTOR 40574455.
- Monaghan, Henry Paul (January 1996). "We the People[s], Original Understanding, and Constitutional Amendment". Columbia Law Review. 96 (1). Columbia Law Review Association, Inc.: 121–177. doi:10.2307/1123218. JSTOR 1123218.
- Moncure, Thomas M. Jr. (1990). "Who is the Militia: The Virginia Ratification Convention and the Right to Bear Arms" (PDF). Lincoln Law Review. 19: 1–25.
- Morgan, Edmund S. (Spring 1986). "Safety in Numbers: Madison, Hume, and the Tenth "Federalist"". Huntington Library Quarterly. 49 (2). University of Pennsylvania Press: 95–112. doi:10.2307/3817178. JSTOR 3817178.
- Morris, Richard B. (February 1977). ""We the People of the United States": The Bicentennial of a People's Revolution". The American Historical Review. 82 (1). Oxford University Press on behalf of the American Historical Association: 1–19. doi:10.2307/1857135. JSTOR 1857135.
- Murrish, William B. (September 1940). "Constitutional Law: Protection of Free Speech under the Federal Constitution". California Law Review. 28 (6). California Law Review, Inc.: 733–747. doi:10.2307/3477411. JSTOR 3477411.
- Nelson, William E. (1987). "Reason and Compromise in the Establishment of the Federal Constitution, 1787-1801". The William and Mary Quarterly. 44 (3). Omohundro Institute of Early American History and Culture: 458–484. doi:10.2307/1939766. JSTOR 1939766.
- Nettels, Curtis Putnam (1957). "The Origins of the Union and of the States". Proceedings of the Massachusetts Historical Society. 72: 68–83. JSTOR 25080515.
- Newsom, David D. (June 1951). "Constitution of the United States". Pakistan Horizon. 4 (2). Pakistan Institute of International Affairs: 101–107. JSTOR 41392481.
- Ohline, Howard A. (October 1971). "Republicanism and Slavery: Origins of the Three-Fifths Clause in the United States Constitution". The William and Mary Quarterly. 28 (4). Omohundro Institute of Early American History and Culture: 563–584. doi:10.2307/1922187. JSTOR 1922187.
- Payne, Samuel B. Jr. (July 1996). "The Iroquois League, the Articles of Confederation, and the Constitution". The William and Mary Quarterly. 53 (3). Omohundro Institute of Early American History and Culture: 605–620. doi:10.2307/2947207. JSTOR 2947207.
- Persson, Torsten; Roland, Gerard; Tabellini, Guido (November 1997). "Separation of Powers and Political Accountability". The Quarterly Journal of Economics. 112 (4). Oxford University Press: 1163–1202. doi:10.1162/003355300555457. JSTOR 2951269.
- Prakash, Saikrishna Bangalore (January 1993). "Hail to the Chief Administrator: The Framers and the President's Administrative Powers". The Yale Law Journal. 102 (4). The Yale Law Journal Co., Inc.: 991–1017. doi:10.2307/796838. JSTOR 796838.
- Pratt, Ronald L. (January 1991). "Alexander Hamilton: The Separation of Powers". Public Affairs Quarterly. 5 (1). University of Illinois Press on behalf of North American Philosophical Publications: 101–115. JSTOR 40435772.
- Pritchett, C. Herman (June 1982). "Congress and Article V Conventions". The Western Political Quarterly. 35 (2). University of Utah on behalf of the Western Political Science Association: 222–227. doi:10.2307/448016. JSTOR 448016.
- Rao, V. Venkata (April–June 1951). "The Preamble". The Indian Journal of Political Science. 12 (2). Indian Political Science Association: 1–11. JSTOR 45405413.
- Rakove, Jack (Autumn 1982). "The Legacy of the Articles of Confederation". Publius. 12 (4). Oxford University Press: 45–66. doi:10.1093/oxfordjournals.pubjof.a037410. JSTOR 3329662.
- Rakove, Jack N. (July 1987). "The Great Compromise: Ideas, Interests, and the Politics of Constitution Making". The William and Mary Quarterly. 44 (3). Omohundro Institute of Early American History and Culture: 424–457. doi:10.2307/1939765. JSTOR 1939765.
- Reck, Andrew J. (March 1991). "The Enlightenment in American Law I: The Declaration of Independence". The Review of Metaphysics. 44 (3). Philosophy Education Society Inc.: 549–573. JSTOR 20129058.
- —— (June 1991). "The Enlightenment in American Law II: The Constitution". The Review of Metaphysics. 44 (4). Philosophy Education Society Inc.: 729–754. JSTOR 20129097.
- —— (September 1991). "The Enlightenment in American Law II: The Bill of Rights". The Review of Metaphysics. 45 (1). Philosophy Education Society Inc.: 57–87. JSTOR 20129137.
- Redish, Martin H. (January 1982). "The Value of Free Speech". University of Pennsylvania Law Review. 130 (3). The University of Pennsylvania Law Review: 591–645. doi:10.2307/3311836. JSTOR 3311836.
- Risjord, Norman K. (November 1967). "The Virginia Federalists". The Journal of Southern History. 33 (4). Southern Historical Association: 486–517. doi:10.2307/2204473. JSTOR 2204473.
- Roche, John P. (December 1961). "The Founding Fathers: A Reform Caucus in Action". The American Political Science Review. 55 (4). American Political Science Association: 799–816. doi:10.2307/1952528. JSTOR 1952528. S2CID 145725823.
- Rosenn, Keith S. (Fall 1990). "The Success of Constitutionalism in the United States and Its Failure in Latin America: An Explanation". The University of Miami Inter-American Law Review. 22 (1). University of Miami Inter-American Law Review: 1–39. JSTOR 40176253.
- Rossman, George (November 1949). "The Spirit of Laws: The Doctrine of Separation of Powers". American Bar Association Journal. 35 (2). Publisher:American Bar Association: 93–96. JSTOR 25716744.
- Roth, Brad R.; Garber, Larry A. (1997). "Popular Sovereignty: The Elusive Norm". Proceedings of the ASIL Annual Meeting. 91: 363–372. doi:10.1017/S027250370006609X. JSTOR 25659148. S2CID 159275129.
- Scanlon, Thomas (Winter 1972). "A Theory of Freedom of Expression". Philosophy & Public Affairs. 1 (2). Wiley: 204–226. JSTOR 2264971.
- Schaaf, Gregory (1988). "From the Great Law of Peace to the Constitution of the United States: A Revision of America's Democratic Roots". American Indian Law Review. 14 (2): 323–331. doi:10.2307/20068293. JSTOR 20068293.
- Schuyler, Robert L. (June 1916). "Agreement in the Federal Convention". Political Science Quarterly. 31 (2). Oxford University Press: 289–299. doi:10.2307/2141563. JSTOR 2141563.
- Sharp, Malcolm P. (April 1935). "The Classical American Doctrine of "The Separation of Powers"". The University of Chicago Law Review. 2 (3). Publisher:The University of Chicago Law Review: 385–436. doi:10.2307/1596321. JSTOR 1596321.
- Simon, Larry G. (1985). "The Authority of the Framers of the Constitution: Can Originalist Interpretation Be Justified?". California Law Review. 73 (5): 1482–1539. doi:10.2307/3480409. JSTOR 3480409.
- Singer, Alan (Fall 1987). "Why Did the Founding Fathers Write the Constitution of the United States?". OAH Magazine of History. 2 (4). Oxford University Press: 25–32. doi:10.1093/maghis/2.4.25. JSTOR 25162564.
- Smith, Steven D. (November 1991). "The Rise and Fall of Religious Freedom in Constitutional Discourse". University of Pennsylvania Law Review. 140 (1). 140: 149–240. doi:10.2307/3312322. JSTOR 3312322. S2CID 55529658. Archived from the original on October 8, 2014.
- Spencer, Mark G. (October 2002). "Hume and Madison on Faction". The William and Mary Quarterly. 59 (4). Omohundro Institute of Early American History and Culture: 869–896. doi:10.2307/3491574. JSTOR 3491574.
- Starna, William A.; Hamell, George R. (October 1996). "History and the Burden of Proof: The Case of Iroquois Influence on the U.S. Constitution". New York History. 77 (4). Fenimore Art Museum: 427–452. JSTOR 23182553.
- Stevens, John Paul (Winter 1992). "The Bill of Rights: A Century of Progress; A Bicentennial Symposium". The University of Chicago Law Review. 59 (1). Publisher: The University of Chicago Law Review: 13–38. doi:10.2307/1599932. JSTOR 1599932.
- Stourzh, Gerald (1970). "William Blackstone: Teacher of Revolution". Jahrbuch für Amerikastudien, Bd. 15. 15. Universitätsverlag WINTER Gmbh: 184–200. JSTOR 41155538.
- Strauss, David A. (March 1991). "Persuasion, Autonomy, and Freedom of Expression". Columbia Law Review. 91 (2). Columbia Law Review Association, Inc.: 334–371. doi:10.2307/1122761. JSTOR 1122761.
- Swaney, W. B. (June 1926). "Religious Freedom". Virginia Law Review. 12 (8). Publisher: Virginia Law Review: 632–644. doi:10.2307/1064947. JSTOR 1064947.
- Swindler, William Finley (February 1981). "Our First Constitution: The Articles of Confederation". American Bar Association Journal. 67 (2). American Bar Association: 166–169. JSTOR 20746978.
- Subramanian, N. A. (September 1961). "Freedom of Religion". Journal of the Indian Law Institute. 3 (3). Indian Law Institute: 323–350. JSTOR 43949715.
- Tanger, Jacob (November 1916). "Amending Procedure of the Federal Constitution". The American Political Science Review. 10 (4). American Political Science Association: 689–699. doi:10.2307/1946825. JSTOR 1946825. S2CID 147117654.
- Taylor, Hannis (August 1907). "The Designer of the Constitution of the United States". The North American Review. 185 (621). University of Northern Iowa: 813–824. JSTOR 25105963.
- —— (December 1907). "Pelatiah Webster: The Architect of Our Federal Constitution". The Yale Law Journal. 17 (2). The Yale Law Journal Co., Inc.: 73–85. doi:10.2307/785698. JSTOR 785698. S2CID 158775771. (Note: See: Pelatiah Webster, clergyman, author and proponent of the U. S. constitution)
- Thelen, David (December 1998). "Making History and Making the United States". Journal of American Studies. 32 (3). Cambridge University Press on behalf of the British Association for American Studies: 373–397. doi:10.1017/S0021875898005945. JSTOR 27556475.
- Tooker, Elisabeth (1988). "The United States Constitution and the Iroquois League". Ethnohistory. 35 (4): 305–336. doi:10.2307/482139. JSTOR 482139.
- Thomas, Robert E. (February 1953). "The Virginia Convention of 1788: A Criticism of Beard's An Economic Interpretation of the Constitution". The Journal of Southern History. 19 (1): 63–72. doi:10.2307/2954311. JSTOR 2954311.
- Thomas, W. Merrill (1991). "The Constitutional Principle of Separation of Powers" (PDF). The Supreme Court Review. 1991. The University of Chicago Press: 225–260. doi:10.1086/scr.1991.3109603. JSTOR 3109603. S2CID 147690997.
- Tribe, Laurence H. (1995). "Taking Text and Structure Seriously: Reflections on Free-Form Method in Constitutional Interpretation". Harvard Law Review. 108 (6): 1221–1303. doi:10.2307/1341856. JSTOR 1341856.
- Ulmer, S. Sidney (July 1960). "The Role of Pierce Butler in the Constitutional Convention". The Review of Politics. 22 (3). Cambridge University Press: 361–374. doi:10.1017/S003467050000098X. JSTOR 1405609. S2CID 143411294.
- Vile, John R. (January 1991). "American Views of the Constitutional Amending Process: An Intellectual History of Article V". The American Journal of Legal History. 35 (1). Oxford University Press: 44–69. doi:10.2307/845582. JSTOR 845582.
- Villard, Oswald Garrison (January 1938). "Freedom of the Press". The Public Opinion Quarterly. 2 (1). Oxford University Press: 56–59. doi:10.1086/265016. JSTOR 2744783.
- Warren, Joseph Parker (October 1905). "The Confederation and the Shays Rebellion". The American Historical Review. 11 (1). Oxford University Press on behalf of the American Historical Association: 42–67. doi:10.2307/1832364. JSTOR 1832364. (Note: Shays' Rebellion established a strong incentive towards the assembling of the Federal Convention and exemplified the need for a strong Federal Constitution.)
- Wellington, Harry H. (May 1979). "On Freedom of Expression". The Yale Law Journal. 88 (6). The Yale Law Journal Company, Inc.: 1105–1142. doi:10.2307/795625. JSTOR 795625.
- Werner, John M. (July–September 1972). "David Hume and America". Journal of the History of Ideas. 33 (3). University of Pennsylvania Press: 439–456. doi:10.2307/2709045. JSTOR 2709045.
- Willis, Hugh Evander (1929). "The Doctrine of Sovereignty under the United States Constitution". Virginia Law Review. 15 (5): 437–475. doi:10.2307/1064899. JSTOR 1064899.
- Wilson, Rick K.; Jillson, Calvin (February 1989). "Leadership Patterns in the Continental Congress: 1774-1789". Legislative Studies Quarterly. 14 (1). Washington University: 5–37. JSTOR 440090.
- Wolfe, Christopher (February 1977). "On Understanding the Constitutional Convention of 1787". The Journal of Politics. 39 (1). The University of Chicago Press: 97–118. doi:10.2307/2129688. JSTOR 2129688. S2CID 154832943.
- —— (Summer 1977). "The Confederate Republic in Montesquieu". Polity. 9 (4). The University of Chicago Press on behalf of the Northeastern Political Science Association: 427–445. doi:10.2307/3234324. JSTOR 3234324. S2CID 155194277. "Key words: Federalist Papers, Madison, The Spirit of the Laws"
- Wright, Herbert (November 1940). "Religious Liberty under the Constitution of the United States". Virginia Law Review. 27 (1): 75–87. doi:10.2307/1067318. JSTOR 1067318.
- York, Neil L. (October 1998). "The First Continental Congress and the Problem of American Rights". The Pennsylvania Magazine of History and Biography. 122 (4). University of Pennsylvania Press: 353–383. JSTOR 20093242.
- Zuckert, Michael P. (Spring 1986). "Federalism and the Founding: Toward a Reinterpretation of the Constitutional Convention". The Review of Politics. 48 (2). Cambridge University Press for the University of Notre Dame: 166–210. doi:10.1017/S0034670500038511. JSTOR 1407128. S2CID 145808869.
- —— (Spring 1992). "Completing the Constitution: The Fourteenth Amendment and Constitutional Rights". Publius. 22 (2). Oxford University Press: 69–91. JSTOR 3330348.
- No name (February 1924). "Constitutional Law. Power of Appointment in the Executive". The Yale Law Journal Limitation by Legislature. 33 (4). The Yale Law Journal Company, Inc.: 435. doi:10.2307/788063. JSTOR 788063.
- "Restrictions on the Freedom of the Press". Harvard Law Review. 16 (1). The Harvard Law Review Association: 55–56. November 1902. doi:10.2307/1322515. JSTOR 1322515.
- "The Relation between Religion and Freedom". The Biblical World. 40 (1). The University of Chicago Press: 3–8. July 1912. doi:10.1086/474610. JSTOR 3141997. S2CID 222435918.
- "The United States and the Articles of Confederation: Drifting toward Anarchy or Inching toward Commonwealth?". The Yale Law Journal. 88 (1). The Yale Law Journal Company: 142–166. November 1978. doi:10.2307/795680. JSTOR 795680.
- Shapiro, Howard M. (Summer 1976). "We The People". Presidential Studies Quarterly. 6 (3). Wiley on behalf of the Center for the Study of the Presidency and Congress: 15–16. JSTOR 20556847.
Top

== 21st century publications ==
- Aberbach, Joel D.; Peterson, Mark A. (2005). The executive branch. New York: Oxford University Press. ISBN 978-0-1953-0915-7.
- Ackerman, Bruce (2005). The Failure of the Founding Fathers: Jefferson, Marshall, and the Rise of Presidential Democracy. Cambridge, MA: Belknap Press of Harvard University Press. ISBN 0-674-01866-4.
- Ackerman, Erin (2011). A Guide to the United States Constitution. New York: W. W. Norton & Company, Inc. ISBN 978-0-3939-1288-3.
- Agel, Jerome B. (2000). We, the people: great documents of the American nation. Barnes & Noble Books. ISBN 978-0-7607-1873-5.
- Amar, Akhil Reed (2005). America's Constitution: A Biography. New York: Random House. ISBN 1-4000-6262-4.
- —— (2016). The Constitution Today: Timeless Lessons for the Issues of Our Era. New York: Basic Books. ISBN 978-0-465-09633-6.
- Amar, Vikram (2009). The First Amendment, Freedom of Speech: Its Constitutional History and the Contemporary Debate. Prometheus Books. ISBN 978-1-5910-2632-7.
- —— (2012). America's Unwritten Constitution: The Precedents and Principles We Live By. New York: Basic Books. ISBN 978-0-465-02957-0.
- Anastaplo, George (2006). Reflections on constitutional law. University Press of Kentucky. ISBN 978-0-8131-2396-7.
- Banks, William C. (2010). Constitutional law: structure and rights in our federal system. New Providence, NJ: LexisNexis. ISBN 978-1-4224-7028-2.
- Barber, Sotirios A.; Fleming, James E. (2007). Constitutional Interpretation: The Basic Questions. Oxford University Press. ISBN 978-0-1997-4507-4.
- Beeman, Richard (2009). Plain Honest Men: The Making of the American Constitution. New York: Random House. ISBN 978-1-4000-6570-7.
- Berkin, Carol (2002). A Brilliant Solution: Inventing the American Constitution. Orlando, FL: Harcourt. ISBN 0-15-100948-1.
- Berkin, Carol (2015). The Bill of Rights: The Fight to Secure America's Liberties. Simon & Schuster. ISBN 978-1-4767-4381-3.
- Billias, George (2009). American Constitutionalism Heard Round the World, 1776–1989: A Global Perspective. New York: New York University Press. ISBN 978-0-8147-9107-3.
- Bordino, Gianpiero, ed. (2016). Federalism: a political theory for our time. Bruxelles and New York: Peter Lang. ISBN 978-2-8076-0055-3.
- Brookhiser, Richard (2004). Gentleman revolutionary: Gouverneur Morris, the rake who wrote the Constitution. New York, N.Y.: Free Press. ISBN 978-0-74325-6025.
- Calabresi, Steven G., ed. (2007). Originalism: A Quarter-Century of Debate. Washington, DC: Regnery Pub. ISBN 978-1-59698-050-1.
- Callahan, Kerry P. (2003). The Articles of Confederation: a primary source investigation into the document that preceded the U.S. Constitution. New York, NY: Rosen Primary Source. ISBN 978-0-8239-3799-8.
- Calvert, Jane E. (2009). Quaker constitutionalism and the political thought of John Dickinson. Cambridge; New York: Cambridge University Press. ISBN 978-0-5218-8436-5.
- Carrese, Paul O. (2010). The Cloaking of Power: Montesquieu, Blackstone, and the Rise of Judicial Activism. Chicago: University of Chicago Press. ISBN 978-0-2260-9483-0. (Note: "Carrese provides a provocative analysis of the intellectual sources of today's powerful judiciary, arguing that Montesquieu, in his Spirit of the Laws, first articulated a new conception of the separation of powers and strong but subtle courts.")
- —— (2016). Democracy in Moderation: Montesquieu, Tocqueville, and Sustainable Liberalism. Cambridge: Cambridge University Press. ISBN 978-1-3165-5878-2.
- Carrithers, David Wallace; Mosher, Michael A.; Rahe, Paul Anthony, eds. (2001). Montesquieu's science of politics: essays on the Spirit of laws. Lanham, Maryland: Rowman & Littlefield Publishers. ISBN 978-0-7425-1181-1. (Note: Publication contains various essays by other editors besides those listed.)
- Childers, Christopher (2012). The Failure of Popular Sovereignty: Slavery, Manifest Destiny, and the Radicalization of Southern Politics. Lawrence, KS: University Press of Kansas. ISBN 978-0-7006-1868-2.
- Conserva, Henry (2011). Understanding the Constitution. AuthorHouse. ISBN 978-1-4634-1378-1.
- Cox, James D. (2007). Process of constitutional decisionmaking: cases and materials. Kluwer Law International. ISBN 978-0-7355-6368-1.
- Cullop, Floyd G. (2009). The Declaration of Independence and the Constitution of the United States of America. New York: Signet Classics. ISBN 978-0-4515-3130-8.
- —— (2001). The Constitution in Congress: The Jeffersonians, 1801-1829. University of Chicago Press. ISBN 978-0-2261-31177.
- Curry, James A.; Riley, Richard B.; Battistoni, Richard M. (2003). Constitutional Government: The American Experience. Kendall Hunt. ISBN 978-0-7-872-9870-8.
- Dahl, Robert A. (2003) [2002]. How Democratic Is the American Constitution?. Yale University Press. ISBN 978-0-3001-3372-1.
- Devins, Neal (2004). The Democratic Constitution. Oxford; New York: Oxford University Press. ISBN 978-0-19991-6542.
- Devins, Neal; Whittington, Keith E. (2005). Congress and the Constitution. Durham: Duke University Press.
- Dippel, Horace (2006). Constitutional Documents of the United States of America 1776-1860. Walter de Gruyter. ISBN 978-3-5983-5757-2.
- Edling, Max M. (2003). A Revolution in Favor of Government:: Origins of the U.S. Constitution and the Making of the American State. Oxford University Press. ISBN 978-0-1951-4870-1.
- Ellis, Joseph J. (2000). Founding Brothers: The Revolutionary Generation. New York: Alfred A. Knopf. ISBN 978-0375-40544-0.
- —— (2015). The Quartet: Orchestrating the Second American Revolution, 1783–1789. New York: Alfred A. Knopf. ISBN 978-0385-35340-3.
- English, Ross M. (2003). "Origins and Development of Congress". The United States Congress. Manchester University Press. pp. 1–15. JSTOR j.ctt155jb28.5.
- Epstein, Richard A. (2014). The Classical Liberal Constitution: The Uncertain Quest for Limited Government. Harvard University Press. ISBN 978-0-6747-2780-9.
- Farber, Daniel (2003). Lincoln's Constitution. Chicago: University of Chicago Press. ISBN 978-0-226-23793-0.
- Favor, Lesli J. (2003). The Iroquois Constitution: a primary source investigation of the law of the Iroquois. New York: Rosen Primary Source. ISBN 978-0-82393-8032. (Note: Covers Benjamin Franklin's role in adopting many of the ideas in the Iroquois Confederation that he added to the Albany Plan which is said to help inspire colonial unity which led to the Articles of confederation and the Constitution.)
- Ferguson, Robert A. (2015). Practice Extended: Beyond Law and Literature. Columbia University Press. doi:10.7312/ferg17536. ISBN 9780231540599. JSTOR 10.7312/ferg17536.
- Ferris, Robert G (2001). The signers of the Constitution. Flagstaff, AZ : Interpretive Publications. ISBN 978-0-9364-7810-4.
- Fisher, Paul (2001). Political dynamics of constitutional law. St. Paul, Minn.: West Group. ISBN 978-0-31424-2303.
- Foner, Eric (2019). The Second Founding: How The Civil War And Reconstruction Remade The Constitution. New York: W.W. Norton & Company, Inc. ISBN 978-0-393-35852-0.
- Funk, William F. (2014). Introduction to American constitutional law: structure and rights. West Academic Publishing. ISBN 978-1-6345-9515-5.
- Gerston, Larry N. (2007), American Federalism: A Concise Introduction, Armonk, New York: M.E. Sharp, ISBN 978-0-7656-1671-5
- Giddens, Sandra (2004). A timeline of the Constitutional Convention. New York: Rosen Central. ISBN 978-0-8239-4535-1.
- Gillman, Howard (2013). American constitutionalism. Vol. I. New York: Oxford University Press. ISBN 978-0-1997-5126-6.
- —— (2013). American constitutionalism. Vol. II. New York: Oxford University Press. ISBN 978-0-1975-2763-4.
- Goodwin, Liu; Karlan, Pamela S. (2009). Keeping Faith with the Constitution. Washington, DC: American Constitution Society for Law and Policy. ISBN 978-0-9823-8390-2.
- Gormley, Ken, ed. (2016). The Presidents and the Constitution: A Living History. New York: New York University Press. ISBN 978-1-4798-3990-2.
- Greene, Jack P. (2011). The constitutional origins of the American Revolution. Cambridge; New York: Cambridge University Press. ISBN 978-1-1394-9293-5.
- Grossberg, Michael; Tomlins, Christopher L., eds. (2008). The Cambridge history of law in America. Vol. I. Cambridge University Press.
- ——; ——, eds. (2008). The Cambridge history of law in America. Vol. II. Cambridge University Press.
- ——; ——, eds. (2008). The Cambridge history of law in America. Vol. III. Cambridge University Press.
- Gregg, Gary L.; Hall, Mark David (2012) [2008]. America's forgotten founders (Second ed.). Wilmington, DE: ISI Books. ISBN 978-1-61017-023-9.
- Haesly, Richard (2002). The Constitutional Convention. Greenhaven Press. ISBN 978-0-7377-1072-4.
- Hennessey, Jonathan (2009). The United States Constitution. Hill and Wang. ISBN 978-1-7218-5266-6.
- Holton, Woody (2007). Unruly Americans and the origins of the Constitution. New York: Hill and Wang. ISBN 978-0-8090-8061-8.
- Hughes, Christopher A. (2005). The Constitutional Convention. San Diego: Blackbirch Press. ISBN 978-1-5671-1918-3.
- Hutson, James H. (2003). Forgotten Features of the Founding: The Recovery of Religious Themes in the Early American Republic. Lexington Books. ISBN 978-0-7391-0570-2.
- Jillson, Calvin C. (2016). American Government: Political Development and Institutional Change (8 ed.). New York: Routledge. ISBN 978-1-138-78366-9.
- Johnson, Calvin H. (2005). Righteous Anger at the Wicked States: The Meaning of the Founders' Constitution. Cambridge University Press. ISBN 978-0-5218-5232-6.
- Kaminski, John P. (2005). Secrecy and the Constitutional Convention (PDF). University of Wisconsin: The Center for the Study of the American Constitution.
- Klarman, Michael J. (2016). Unfinished Business: Racial Equality in American History. New York: Oxford University Press. ISBN 978-0-19-994203-9.
- Kommers, Donald P.; Finn, John E.; Jacobsohn, Gary J. (2010). American constitutional law: essays, cases, and comparative notes. Belmont, California: International Thomson Publishing Company: West/Wadsworth. ISBN 978-0-314-12745-7.
- Kramer, Larry (2004). The people themselves: popular constitutionalism and judicial review. New York: Oxford University Press. ISBN 978-0-1980-3782-8.
- Larson, Edward J.; Winship, Michael P. (2005). The Constitutional Convention: A Narrative History from the Notes of James Madison. New York: The Modern Library. ISBN 0-8129-7517-0.
- Levinson, Sanford (2006). Our Undemocratic Constitution: Where the Constitution Goes Wrong (and How We the People Can Correct It). Oxford; New York: Oxford University Press. ISBN 0-19-530751-8.
- Levy, Leonard W.; Karst, Kenneth L., eds. (2000). Encyclopedia of the American Constitution. Vol. 1. New York: Macmillan Reference USA. ISBN 0-02-864880-3.
- ——; ——, eds. (2000). Encyclopedia of the American Constitution. Vol. 2. New York: Macmillan Reference USA. ISBN 0-02-864880-3.
- ——; ——, eds. (2000). Encyclopedia of the American Constitution. Vol. 3. New York: Macmillan Reference USA. ISBN 0-02-864880-3.
- ——; ——, eds. (2000). Encyclopedia of the American Constitution. Vol. 4. New York: Macmillan Reference USA. ISBN 0-02-864880-3.
- ——; ——, eds. (2000). Encyclopedia of the American Constitution. Vol. 5. New York: Macmillan Reference USA. ISBN 0-02-864880-3.
- ——; ——, eds. (2000). Encyclopedia of the American Constitution. Vol. 6. New York: Macmillan Reference USA. ISBN 0-02-864880-3.
- Lewis, Jason (2011). Power divided is power checked: the argument for states' rights. Minneapolis, MN: Bascom Hill Pub. Group. ISBN 978-1-93509-8508.
- Maier, Pauline (2010). Ratification: The People Debate the Constitution, 1787-1788. New York: Simon & Schuster. ISBN 978-0-684-86854-7.
- Marbach, Joseph R. E.; Katz, Ellis; Smith, Troy, eds. (2006). Federalism in America: an encyclopedia. Vol. I. Westport, Connecticut: Greenwood Press. ISBN 978-0-3133-2947-0.
- ——; ——; ——, eds. (2006). Federalism in America: an encyclopedia. Vol. II. Westport, Connecticut: Greenwood Press. ISBN 978-0-3133-2948-7.
- McDowell, Gary L.; O'Neill, Jonathan, eds. (2007). America and Enlightenment Constitutionalism. Springer. ISBN 978-0-2306-0106-2. (Note: Work contains ten chapters with an author for each. Numerous references to Montesquieu, John Locke, David Hume, William Blackstone are made throughout; eighteenth century enlightenment philosophers.)
- McClanahan, Brion T (2012). The Founding Fathers' Guide to the Constitution. MJF Books. ISBN 978-1-6067-1298-6.
- McGuire, Robert A. (2003). To Form a More Perfect Union: A New Economic Interpretation of the United States Constitution. New York: Oxford University Press. ISBN 0-19-513970-4.
- McManus, Edgar J; Helfman, Tara (2014). Liberty and Union: a constitutional history of the United States. New York: Routledge. ISBN 978-1-1367-5660-3.
- McNeese, Tim (2006). Alexander Hamilton: framer of the Constitution. Philadelphia [Pa.]: Chelsea House Publishers. ISBN 978-0-79108-6162.
- Meese, Edwin III (2005). The Heritage Guide to the Constitution. Washington, DC: Heritage Foundation. ISBN 978-1-5969-8001-3.
- Moehn, Heather (2003). The U.S. Constitution: A Primary Source Investigation Into the Fundamental Law of the United States. The Rosen Publishing Group. ISBN 978-0-8239-3804-9.
- Monk, Linda (2003). The words we live by: your annotated guide to the constitution. New York: Hyperion. ISBN 978-0-3163-81864.
- Morton, Joseph (2006). Shapers of the Great Debate at the Constitutional Convention of 1787: A Biographical Dictionary. Westport, CT: Greenwood Press. ISBN 978-0-3133-3021-6.
- Navarra, Albert A (2010). The elements of constitutional law: a guide to America's most timeless and powerful document. Newport Beach, California: Law Book Press. ISBN 978-0-98447-8606.
- Nelson, Randy J., ed. (2003). Lectures on religion and the founding of the American republic. Brigham Young University. ISBN 978-0-84252-5480.
- Odesser-Torpey, Marilyn (2013). Insiders' Guide to Philadelphia & Pennsylvania Dutch Country. Morris Book Publishing. ISBN 978-0-76278-3762.
- Palumbo, Arthur E. (2009). The Authentic Constitution: An Originalist View of America's Legacy. Algora Publishing. ISBN 978-0-8758-6707-6.
- Pauley, Matthew A. (2014). Athens, Rome, and England: America's constitutional heritage. Wilmington, Delaware: Griffon House Publications. ISBN 978-1-6101-7083-3.
- Paulsen, Michael Stokes; Calabresi, Stephen G.; McConnell, Michael W.; Bray, Samuel L. (2013). The Constitution of the United States. St. Paul, MN: Foundation Press. ISBN 978-1-5877-8880-2. "Case studies and essays involving Constitutional law. (1659 pages)"
- Price Hossell, Karen (2004). The United States Constitution. Chicago, Ill.: Heinemann Library. ISBN 978-1-4034-3434-0.
- Rahe, Paul Anthony (2009). Montesquieu and the Logic of Liberty: War, Religion, Commerce, Climate, Terrain, Technology, Uneasiness of Mind, the Spirit of Political Vigilance, and the Foundations of the Modern Republic. Yale University Press. ISBN 978-0-3001-5611-9.
- Randall, Richard S. (2003). American constitutional development. New York: Longman. ISBN 978-0-8013-2019-4.
- Raphael, Ray (2004). Founding Myths: Stories That Hide Our Patriotic Past. New York: MJF Books. ISBN 1-56731-886-X.
- Reagan, Richard J. (2013). The American Constitution and religion. Catholic University of America Press. ISBN 978-0-8132-2153-3.
- Ragosta, John A. (2013). Religious freedom: Jefferson's legacy, America's creed. Charlottesville: University of Virginia Press. ISBN 978-0-8139-3370-2.
- Richards, David A. J. (2014). Conscience and the Constitution: History, Theory, and Law of the Reconstruction Amendments. Princeton University Press. ISBN 978-1-4008-6356-3.
- Richards, David A. J. (2023). Revolution and Constitutionalism in Britain and the United States: Burke, Madison and Their Contemporary Legacies. Taylor & Francis. ISBN 978-1-0325-3006-2.
- Scarinci, Donald (2005). David Brearley and the making of the United States Constitution. Trenton, New Jersey: New Jersey Heritage Press. ISBN 978-0-9431-3636-3. (Note: David Brearley was an American Founding Father and a signatory of the U. S. Constitution.)
- Schultz, David Andrew (2009). Encyclopedia of the United States Constitution. Vol. I. New York: Facts On File. ISBN 978-0-8160-6763-3.
- —— (2009). Encyclopedia of the United States Constitution. Vol. II. New York: Facts On File. ISBN 978-0-8160-6763-3.
- Shea, Therese (2014). The United States Constitution. New York, NY: Gareth Stevens Publishing.
- Shipler, David K. (2015). Freedom of speech: mightier than the sword. New York: Alfred A. Knopf. ISBN 978-0-3079-5732-0.
- Simon, James F. (2002). What kind of nation: Thomas Jefferson, John Marshall, and the epic struggle to create a United States. Waterville, Maine: Thorndike Press. ISBN 0-7862-4547-6.
- Sonneborn, Liz (2013). The United States Constitution. Chicago: Heinemann Library. ISBN 978-1-4329-6752-9.
- Stewart, David O. (2007). The Summer of 1787: The Men Who Invented the Constitution. New York: Simon and Schuster. ISBN 978-0-7432-8692-3.
- Stone, Geoffrey R. (2008). The First Amendment. New York: Aspen Publishers. ISBN 978-0-7355-6929-4. "Freedom of Speech"
- Tushnet, Mark V. (2009). The Constitution of the United States of America: A Contextual Analysis. Portland, OR: Hart Publishing. ISBN 978-1-84113-738-4.
- ——; Graeber, Mark A.; Levinson, Sanford, eds. (2015). The Oxford Handbook of the U.S. Constitution. Oxford; New York: Oxford University Press. ISBN 978-0-19-024575-7.
- Van Cleve, George (2017). We Have Not a Government: The Articles of Confederation and the Road to the Constitution. University of Chicago Press. ISBN 978-0-2264-8050-3.
- Weaver, Russell L. (2006). Understanding the First Amendment. Newark, New Jersey: LexisNexis Matthew Bender. ISBN 978-1-5310-0124-7.
- Wexter, Jay (2011). The Odd Clauses: Understanding the Constitution Through Ten of Its Most Curious Provisions. Beacon Press. ISBN 978-0-8070-0091-5.
- Wood, Gordon S. (2011). The Idea of America: Reflections on the Birth of the United States. The Penguin Press. ISBN 978-1-59420-290-2.
- Young, Ernest A. (2012). The Supreme Court and the constitutional structure. New York, NY: Foundation Press, Thomson/West. ISBN 978-1-5994-1740-0.
Top

=== Journals 3 ===
- Ablavsky, Gregory (February 2014). "The Savage Constitution". Duke Law Journal. 63 (5). Duke University School of Law: 999–1089. JSTOR 23792715.
- Ackerman, Bruce (January 2000). "The New Separation of Powers". Harvard Law Review. 113 (3). The Harvard Law Review Association: 633–729. doi:10.2307/1342286. JSTOR 1342286.
- Altman, John A. (May 2003). "The Articles and the Constitution: Similar in Nature, Different in Design". Pennsylvania Legacies. 3 (1). University of Pennsylvania Press: 20–21. JSTOR 27764871.
- Austin, Michael (Summer 2013). "Our Bickering Founding Fathers and Their Messy, Flawed, Divinely Inspired Constitution". Dialogue: A Journal of Mormon Thought. 46 (2): 172–178. doi:10.5406/dialjmormthou.46.2.0172. S2CID 246618415.
- Baack, Ben; McGuire, Robert A.; Van Cott, T. Norman (2009). "Constitutional Agreement during the Drafting of the Constitution: A New Interpretation". The Journal of Legal Studies. 38 (2): 533–567. doi:10.1086/597327. JSTOR 597327. S2CID 154855240.
- Balkin, Jack M. (November 2018). "Free Speech is a triangle". Columbia Law Review. 118 (7). Columbia Law Review Association, Inc.: 2011–2056. JSTOR 26524953.
- Ballingrud, Gordon; Dougherty, Keith L. (October 2018). "Coalitional Instability and the Three-Fifths Compromise". American Journal of Political Science. 62 (4). Midwest Political Science Association: 861–872. doi:10.1111/ajps.12378. JSTOR 26598788. S2CID 158959015.
- Banning, Lance (April 1974). "Republican Ideology and the Triumph of the Constitution, 1789 to 1793". The William and Mary Quarterly. 31 (2). Omohundro Institute of Early American History and Culture: 167–188. doi:10.2307/1920908. JSTOR 1920908.
- Barber, N. W. (March 2001). "Prelude to the Separation of Powers". The Cambridge Law Journal. 60 (1). Cambridge University Press: 59–88. doi:10.1017/S0008197301000629. JSTOR 4508751.
- Barden, Garrett (2012). "We The People". Irish Jurist. 48: 323–342. JSTOR 44027506.
- Barker, Robert S. (2012). "Natural Law and the United States Constitution". The Review of Metaphysics. 66 (1). Philosophy Education Society Inc.: 105–130. JSTOR 41635554.
- Berkin, Carol (2006). "'We, the People of the United States': The Birth of an American Identity". OAH Magazine of History. 20 (4): 53–54. doi:10.1093/maghis/20.4.53. JSTOR 25162070.
- Bogus, Carl T. (Winter 2004). "The Battle for Separation of Powers in Rhode Island". Administrative Law Review. 56 (1). American Bar Association: 77–134. JSTOR 40712165.
- Boonshoft, Mark (Summer 2012). "Doughfaces at the Founding: Federalists, Anti-Federalists, Slavery, and the Ratification of the Constitution in New York". New York History. 93 (3). Fenimore Art Museum: 187–218. doi:10.2307/newyorkhist.93.3.187. JSTOR 93.3.187.
- Borowiak, Craig T. (November 2007). "Accountability Debates: The Federalists, The Anti-Federalists, and Democratic Deficits". The Journal of Politics. 69 (4). The University of Chicago Press: 998–1014. doi:10.1111/j.1468-2508.2007.00603.x. JSTOR j.1468-2508.2007.00603.x. S2CID 154723060.
- Bradley, Curtis A.; Morrison, Trevor W. (December 2012). "Historical Gloss and Separation of Powers". Harvard Law Review. 126 (2). The Harvard Law Review Association: 411–485. JSTOR 23414504.
- Braunstein, Ruth (2011). "Who Are 'We the People'?". Contexts. 10 (2): 72–73. doi:10.1177/1536504211408942. JSTOR 41960214. S2CID 62758868.
- Callanan, Keegan (September 2014). "Liberal Constitutionalism and Political Particularism in Montesquieu's "The Spirit of the Laws"". Political Research Quarterly. 67 (3). Sage Publications, Inc.: University of Utah: 589–602. doi:10.1177/1065912914525862. JSTOR 24371894. S2CID 144988453.
- Campbell, Jud (November 2017). "Natural Rights and the First Amendment". The Yale Law Journal. 127 (2). The Yale Law Journal Company, Inc.: 246–321. JSTOR 45098034. "Freedom of Speech"
- Chafetz, Josh (February 2012). "Congress's Constitution". University of Pennsylvania Law Review. 160 (3). Publisher:University of Pennsylvania Law Review: 715–778. JSTOR 41511291.
- Claus, Laurence (2019). "The Framers' Compromise". American Journal of Comparative Law. 67 (3). Oxford University Press: 677–84. doi:10.1093/ajcl/avz022. JSTOR 26866524.
- Cleve, George William (Winter 2014). "The Anti-Federalists' Toughest Challenge: Paper Money, Debt Relief, and the Ratification of the Constitution". Journal of the Early Republic. 34 (4). University of Pennsylvania Press: 529–560. doi:10.1353/jer.2014.0063. JSTOR 24486660. S2CID 201733427.
- Coby, John Patrick (Fall 2017). "America's Machiavellian: Gouverneur Morris at the Constitutional Convention". The Review of Politics. 79 (4). Cambridge University Press for the University of Notre Dame du lac on behalf of Review of Politics: 621–648. doi:10.1017/S0034670517000614. JSTOR 26564779. S2CID 149154209.
- Coenen, Dan T. (November 2006). "A Rhetoric for Ratification: The Argument of "The Federalist" and Its Impact on Constitutional Interpretation". Duke Law Journal. 56 (2). Duke University School of Law: 569–543. JSTOR 40040551.
- Coenen, Michael (March 2010). "The Significance of Signatures: Why the Framers Signed the Constitution and What They Meant by Doing So". The Yale Law Journal. 119 (5). The Yale Law Journal Company, Inc.: 966–1010. JSTOR 20698315.
- Corley, Pamela C.; Howard, Robert M.; Nixon, David C. (January 2005). "The Supreme Court and Opinion Content: The Use of the Federalist Papers". Political Research Quarterly. 68 (2). Sage Publications, Inc.: University of Utah: 329–340. doi:10.2307/3595633. JSTOR 3595633.
- Joseph M., Dawson (Autumn 2008). "The Meaning of Separation of Church and State in the First Amendment Special Issue". Journal of Church and State. 50 (4). Oxford University Press: 677–681. doi:10.1093/jcs/50.4.677. JSTOR 23921771.
- Dickinson, Harry T. (2018). "Magna Carta in the American Revolution". Magna Carta: History, Context and Influence. University of London Press; Institute of Historical Research: 79–100. ISBN 9781909646872. JSTOR j.ctv5136sc.13.
- Dyer, Justin Buckley (July 2010). "Slavery and the Magna Carta in the Development of Anglo-American Constitutionalism". Political Science and Politics. 43 (3). American Political Science Association: 479–482. doi:10.2307/1110845. JSTOR 1110845.
- Ewald, William; Toler, Lorianne Updike (July 2011). "Early Drafts of the U.S. Constitution". The Pennsylvania Magazine of History and Biography. 135 (3). The Historical Society of Pennsylvania; University of Pennsylvania Press: 227–238. doi:10.5215/pennmaghistbio.135.3.0227. JSTOR 10.5215/pennmaghistbio.135.3.0227.
- Fumurescu, Alin (2018). "The People's Two Bodies: An Alternative Perspective on Populism and Elitism". Political Research Quarterly. 71 (4). Sage Publications, Inc.: University of Utah: 842–853. doi:10.1177/1065912918768891. JSTOR 26600632. S2CID 150153745.
- Gardbaum, Stephen (December 2003). "The "Horizontal Effect" of Constitutional Rights" (PDF). Michigan Law Review. 102 (3). Michigan Law Review Association, Inc.: 387–459. doi:10.2307/3595366. JSTOR 3595366.
- Gelman, David A. (September 2013). "Ideology and Participation: Examining the Constitutional Convention of 1787". Political Research Quarterly. 71 (3). Sage Publications, Inc.: University of Utah: 546–559. doi:10.1177/1065912917749751. JSTOR 45106681. S2CID 158847998.
- Gilhooley, Simon J. (Spring 2013). "The Framers Themselves: Constitutional Authorship during the Ratification". American Political Thought. 2 (1). The University of Chicago Press: 62–88. doi:10.1086/669688. JSTOR 669688. S2CID 153445809.
- Gish, Dustin A.; Klinghard, Daniel P. (January 2012). "Republican Constitutionalism in Thomas Jefferson's Notes on the State of Virginia". The Journal of Politics. 74 (1). The University of Chicago Press on behalf of the Southern Political Science Association: 35–51. doi:10.1017/s0022381611001125. JSTOR 10.1017/s0022381611001125.
- Goldberg, Erica (April 2016). "Free Speech Consequentialism". Columbia Law Review. 116 (3). Columbia Law Review Association, Inc.: 687–756. JSTOR 43783393. "Freedom of Speech"
- Greeson, Jennifer (Spring 2013). "American Enlightenment: The New World and Modern Western Thought". American Literary History. 25 (1). Oxford University Press: 6–17. doi:10.1093/alh/ajs072. JSTOR 23358467.
- Harvard Law Review Editorial Staff (2013). "The Meaning(s) of 'The People' in the Constitution". Harvard Law Review. 126 (4). The Harvard Law Review Association: 1078–1099. JSTOR 23414792.
- Heckelman, Jac C.; Dougherty, Keith L. (June 2013). "A Spatial Analysis of Delegate Voting at the Constitutional Convention". The Journal of Economic History. 73 (2). Cambridge University Press: 407–444. doi:10.1017/S0022050713000314. JSTOR 24551041. S2CID 45123075.
- Henkin, Louis (2019). "The United States Constitution as Social Compact". Transactions of the American Philosophical Society. 107 (4): 43–51. JSTOR 45183634.
- Jacobsohn, Gary Jeffrey (Summer 2006). "Constitutional Identity". The Review of Politics. 6 (3). Cambridge University Press: 361–397. doi:10.1017/S0034670506000192. JSTOR 20452799. S2CID 233342965.
- Johnson, Herbert A. (2016). "American Constitutionalism and the War for Independence". Early American Studies. 14 (1): 140–173. doi:10.1353/eam.2016.0004. JSTOR 44630818. S2CID 146958088.
- Kilberg, Andrew G. I. (September 2014). "We The People: The Original meaning of Popular Sovereignty". Virginia Law Review. 100 (5). Publisher: Virginia Law Review: 1061–1109. JSTOR 24362715.
- Kistler, Cameron O. (November 2011). "The Anti-Federalists and Presidential War Powers". The Yale Law Journal. 121 (2). The Yale Law Journal Company: 459–468. JSTOR 23079337.
- Krause, Sharon (Spring 2000). "The Spirit of Separate Powers in Montesquieu". The Review of Politics. 62 (2). Cambridge University Press: 231–265. doi:10.1017/S0034670500029454. JSTOR 1408037. S2CID 154678728.
- Larson, Carlton F. W. (April 2006). "The Forgotten Constitutional Law of Treason and the Enemy Combatant Problem". University of Pennsylvania Law Review. 154 (4): 863–826. doi:10.2307/40041287. JSTOR 40041287. S2CID 140523646. Archived from the original on October 8, 2014.
- Lee, Youngjae (May 2012). "Punishing Disloyalty? Treason, Espionage, and the Transgression of Political Boundaries". Law and Philosophy. 31 (2). Springer: 299–342. doi:10.1007/s10982-011-9123-0. JSTOR 41487014. S2CID 254746722.
- Levy, Jacob T. (Spring 2006). "Beyond Publius: Montesquieu, Liberal Republicanism and the Small-Republic Thesis". History of Political Thought. 27 (1). Imprint Academic Ltd.: 50–90. JSTOR 26221900. "Key words: The Spirit of Laws, David Hume, Adam Smith"
- Madan, T. N. (March 2003). "Freedom of Religion". Economic and Political Weekly. 38 (11). Publisher: Economic and Political Weekly: 1034–1041. JSTOR 4413338.
- Magill, M. Elizabeth (September 2000). "The Real Separation in Separation of Powers Law". Virginia Law Review. 86 (6). Publisher: Economic and Political Weekly: 1127–1198. doi:10.2307/1073943. JSTOR 1073943. Archived from the original on September 29, 2022.
- Maier, Pauline (April 2012). "Narrative, Interpretation, and the Ratification of the Constitution". The William and Mary Quarterly. 69 (2). Omohundro Institute of Early American History and Culture: 382–390. doi:10.5309/willmaryquar.69.2.0382. hdl:1721.1/72071. JSTOR 10.5309/willmaryquar.69.2.0382.
- Manning, John F. (June 2011). "Separation of Powers as Ordinary Interpretation". Harvard Law Review. 124 (8). The Harvard Law Review Association: 1939–2040. JSTOR 41306771.
- Manzer, Robert A. (July 2001). "A Science of Politics: Hume, The Federalist, and the Politics of Constitutional Attachment". American Journal of Political Science. 45 (3). Midwest Political Science Association: 508–518. doi:10.2307/2669235. JSTOR 2669235.
- Marshfield, Jonathan L. (November 2016). "Amendment Creep". Michigan Law Review. 15 (2). Michigan Law Review Association, Inc.: 215–276. doi:10.36644/mlr.115.2.amendment. JSTOR 44984877.
- Martínez, Jenny S. (2011). "International Courts and the U.S. Constitution: Re-examining the History". University of Pennsylvania Law Review. 159 (4): 1069–1140. JSTOR 41149893.
- Michaels, Jon D. (April 2015). "An Enduring, Evolving Separation of Powers". Columbia Law Review. 15 (3). Columbia Law Review Association, Inc.: 515–597. JSTOR 43267874.
- Miles, Albert S. (2000). "Blackstone and his American Legacy". Australia & New Zealand Journal of Law and Education. 5 (2). ISSN 1327-7634.
- Miller, Robert J. (March 2015). "American Indian Constitutions and Their Influence on the United States Constitution". Proceedings of the American Philosophical Society. 159 (1). American Philosophical Society: 32–56. JSTOR 24640169.
- Muñoz, Vincent Phillip (Winter 2003). "George Washington on Religious Liberty". The Review of Politics. 65 (1). Cambridge University Press: 11–33. doi:10.1017/S0034670500036512. JSTOR 1408786. S2CID 145801676.
- O'Hanlon, Gerry (February 2013). "Religious Freedom". The Furrow. 64 (2): 67–77. JSTOR 24635745.
- Paulsen, Michael Stokes (June 2009). "The Constitutional Power to Interpret International Law". The Yale Law Journal. 118 (8). The Yale Law Journal Company, Inc.: 1762–1842. JSTOR 40389522.
- Pope, Jeremy C.; Treier, Shawn (April 2011). "Reconsidering the Great Compromise at the Federal Convention of 1787: Deliberation and Agenda Effects on the Senate and Slavery". American Journal of Political Science. 55 (2). Midwest Political Science Association: 289–306. doi:10.1111/j.1540-5907.2010.00490.x. JSTOR 23025052.
- Pozen, David E. (February 2016). "Constitutional Bad Faith". Harvard Law Review. 129 (4). The Harvard Law Review Association: 885–955. JSTOR 24644145.
- ——; Kessler, Jeremy K. (November 2018). "The Search for and Egalitarian First Amendment". Columbia Law Review. 118 (7). Columbia Law Review Association, Inc.: 1953–2010. JSTOR 26524952.
- ——; Kessler, Jeremy K. (November 2018). "The Search for and Egalitarian First Amendment". Columbia Law Review. 118 (7). Columbia Law Review Association, Inc.: 1953–2010. JSTOR 26524952. "Over the past decade, the Roberts Court has handed down a series of rulings that demonstrate the degree to which the First Amendment can be used to thwart economic and social welfare regulation."
- —— (December 2021). "The Puzzles and Possibilities of Article V". Columbia Law Review. 121 (8). Columbia Law Review Association, Inc.: 2317–2396. JSTOR 27093853.
- Rappaport, Michael B. (November 2010). "Reforming Article V: The Problems created by the National Convention Amendment Method and how to Fix Them". Virginia Law Review. 96 (7). Publisher:Virginia Law Review: 1509–1581. JSTOR 20788836.
- Robinson, Daniel N. (April 2007). "The Scottish Enlightenment and the American Founding". The Monist. 90 (2). Oxford University Press: 170–181. doi:10.5840/monist200790211. JSTOR 27904025.
- Roznai, Yaniv (Summer 2013). "Unconstitutional Constitutional Amendments—The Migration and Success of a Constitutional Idea". The American Journal of Comparative Law. 61 (3). Oxford University Press: 657–719. doi:10.5131/AJCL.2012.0027. JSTOR 43668170.
- Rubenfeld, Jed (April 2001). "The First Amendment's Purpose". Stanford Law Review. 53 (4). Publisher: Stanford Law Review: 767–832. doi:10.2307/1229492. JSTOR 1229492. "Freedom of Speech"
- Samuel, Ana J. (May 2009). "The Design of Montesquieu's "The Spirit of the Laws": The Triumph of Freedom over Determinism". The American Political Science Review. 103 (2). American Political Science Association: 305–321. doi:10.1017/S0003055409090273. JSTOR 27798503. S2CID 145051262.
- Schauer, Frederick (April 2004). "The Boundaries of the First Amendment: A Preliminary Exploration of Constitutional Salience". Harvard Law Review. 117 (6). The Harvard Law Review Association: 1765–1809. doi:10.2307/4093304. JSTOR 4093304.
- —— (January 2012). "Harm(s) and the First Amendment". The Supreme Court Review. 2011 (1). The University of Chicago Press: 81–111. doi:10.1086/665583. JSTOR 665583. S2CID 144057429.
- Sheehan, Colleen A. (August 2004). "Madison v. Hamilton: The Battle over Republicanism and the Role of Public Opinion". The American Political Science Review. 98 (3). American Political Science Association: 405–424. doi:10.1017/S0003055404001248. JSTOR 4145337. S2CID 145693742.
- Schultz, Harold S. (1980). "James Madison: Father of the Constitution?". Journal of the Library of Congress. 37 (2): 215–222. JSTOR 29781852.
- Schwarz, Michael (Fall 2007). "The Great Divergence Reconsidered: Hamilton, Madison, and U.S.-British Relations, 1783-89". Journal of the Early Republic. 27 (3). University of Pennsylvania Press: 407–436. doi:10.1353/jer.2007.0052. JSTOR 30043515. S2CID 144148487.
- Slez, Adam; Martin, John Levi (February 2007). "Political Action and Party Formation in the United States Constitutional Convention". American Sociological Review. 74 (1). American Sociological Association: 42–67. doi:10.1177/000312240707200103. JSTOR 25472447. S2CID 18763124.
- Strauss, David A. (March 2001). "The Irrelevance of Constitutional Amendments". Harvard Law Review. 114 (5). The Harvard Law Review Association: 1457–1505. doi:10.2307/1342685. JSTOR 1342685.
- Stubben, Jerry D. (September 2003). "The Indigenous Influence Theory of American Democracy". Social Science Quarterly. 81 (3). University of Texas Press: 716–731. JSTOR 42863999.
- Sullivan, Kathleen M. (November 2010). "Two Concepts of Freedom of Speech". Harvard Law Review. 124 (1). Harvard Law Review Association: 143–177. JSTOR 20788316.
- Tanaka, Hideo (June 2010). "The Scottish Enlightenment and Its Influence on the American Enlightenment". The Kyoto Economic Review. 79 (1). Kyoto University: 16–39. JSTOR 43213383.
- Taylor, Michael H.; Hardwick, Kevin (2009). "The Presidency of James Wilson". White House Studies. 9 (4). Nova Science Publishers: 331–346.
- Trigg, Roger (Winter 2010). "Freedom of Conscience and Freedom of Religion". Studies: An Irish Quarterly Review. 99 (396). Messenger Publications: 407–414. JSTOR 27896507.
- Van Cleve, George W. (2014). "The Anti-Federalists' Toughest Challenge: Paper Money, Debt Relief, and the Ratification of the Constitution". Journal of the Early Republic. 34 (4): 529–560. doi:10.1353/jer.2014.0063. JSTOR 24486660. S2CID 201733427.
- Versteeg, Mila; Zackin, Emily (2014). "American Constitutional Exceptionalism Revisited". The University of Chicago Law Review. 81 (4). Publisher: The University of Chicago Law Review: 1641–1707. JSTOR 43151587.
- Vile, John R. (2006). "The Critical Role of Committees at the U.S. Constitutional Convention of 1787". The American Journal of Legal History. 48 (2): 147–176. doi:10.2307/25434790. JSTOR 25434790.
- Ward, Lee (Fall 2007). "Montesquieu on Federalism and Anglo-Gothic Constitutionalism". Publius. 37 (4). Oxford University Press: 551–577. doi:10.1093/publius/pjm018. JSTOR 20184956. "Key words: Separation of Powers"
- Westbury, Susan (Fall 2001). "Robert Yates and John Lansing, Jr.: New York Delegates Abandon the Constitutional Convention". New York History. 82 (4). Fenimore Art Museum: 313–335. JSTOR 42677797. "On July 10, 1787, during the sixth week of the Constitutional Convention, New York delegates Robert Yates and John Lansing Jr. left and never returned. ..."
- Young, Ernest A. (December 2007). "The Constitution outside the Constitution". The Yale Law Journal. 117 (3). The Yale Law Journal Company, Inc.: 408–473. doi:10.2307/20455798. JSTOR 20455798.
- —— (2014). "The Puzzling Persistence of Dual Federalism". Nomos. 55. American Society for Political and Legal Philosophy: 34–82. JSTOR 24220374.
- —— (August 2015). "Federalism as a Constitutional Principle". University of Cincinnati Law Review. 83 (4). University of Cincinnati: 1057–1082.
- ——; Baker, Lynn A. (October 2001). "Federalism and the Double Standard of Judicial Review". Duke Law Journal. 51 (1). Duke University School of Law: 75–164. doi:10.2307/1373231. JSTOR 1373231.
- Zink, James R. (August 2009). "The Language of Liberty and Law: James Wilson on America's Written Constitution". The American Political Science Review. 103 (3). American Political Science Association: 442–445. doi:10.1017/S0003055409990086. JSTOR 27798515. S2CID 145568103.
- —— (June 2014). "James Wilson versus the Bill of Rights: Progress, Popular Sovereignty, and the Idea of the U.S. Constitution". Political Research Quarterly. 67 (2). Sage Publications, Inc. on behalf of the University of Utah: 253–265. doi:10.1177/1065912913513351. JSTOR 24371781. S2CID 154058817.
- "The Meaning(s) of "The People" in the Constitution". Harvard Law Review. 126 (4). The Harvard Law Review Association: 1078–1099. February 2013. JSTOR 23414792.
Top

== Primary sources ==
- The Declaration of Independence and the Constitution of the United States of America. Washington, D.C.: Cato Institute. 2013. ISBN 978-1-8825-7767-5.
- United States Congress (1841). United States Constitution (original text). Washington, DC: Gales & Seaton.
- Second Continental Congress (1899) [1777]. Cleveland, Frederick A. (ed.). The Articles of Confederation. Boston, B. H. Sanborn.
- Ford, Worthington C. (1904). Journals of the Continental Congress. Vol. 31 volumes. Washington: U.S. Government Printing Office.
- Hamilton, Alexander; Madison, James; Jay, John (2009). The Federalist and Anti-Federalist Papers: Debates That Made America. Seattle: Beacon Hill. ISBN 978-1-4536-3419-6. (Note: Work contains the Complete arguments presented by Alexander Hamilton, James Madison and John Jay for ratification, and by Patrick Henry, Robert Yates, and Samuel Byron against it.)

- Hamilton, Alexander; Madison, James (2007) [1793-1794]. The Pacificus-Helvidius Debates of 1793-1794: Toward the Completion of the American Founding. Liberty Fund. ISBN 978-0-86597-6887.
- Documentary history of the Constitution of the United States of America, 1786-1870. Vol. I. Washington: Department of State. 1901. "Key words, vols I-V: Madison, Washington, Jefferson, Hamilton, Franklin, Convention, Bill of Rights, Ratification" (Note: Five volume work contains much of the correspondence between Madison, Jefferson, Washington, et al, and other documents housed in the Bureau of Rolls and Library of the Department of State relating to the formation of the Constitution.)
- Documentary history of the Constitution of the United States of America, 1786-1870. Vol. II. Washington: Department of State. 1901.
- Documentary history of the Constitution of the United States of America, 1786-1870. Vol. III. Washington: Department of State. 1901.
- Documentary history of the Constitution of the United States of America, 1786-1870. Vol. IV. Washington: Department of State. 1901.
- Documentary history of the Constitution of the United States of America, 1786-1870. Vol. V. Washington: Department of State. 1901.

- Adams, John (1787–1788). A defence of the constitutions of government of the United States of America. Vol. I. Philadelphia: Printed by Budd and Bartram for William Cobbett, opposite Christ church. (Note: John Adams wrote his three-volume work, A Defense of the Constitutions of Government of the United States of America while in London in the face of various acquaintances in Europe who criticized the Constitution of the United States.)
- —— (1787–1788). A defence of the constitutions of government of the United States of America. Vol. II. London: Printed for C. Dilly.
- —— (1797). A defence of the constitutions of government of the United States of America. Vol. III. London: Printed for C. Dilly.
- Bailyn, Bernard, ed. (1993). The Debate on the Constitution: Federalist and Antifederalist Speeches, Articles, and Letters During the Struggle for Ratification. Vol. Part One: September 1787 to February 1788. The Library of America. ISBN 0-940450-42-9.
- ——, ed. (1993). The Debate on the Constitution: Federalist and Antifederalist Speeches, Articles, and Letters During the Struggle for Ratification. Vol. Part Two: January to August 1788. The Library of America. ISBN 978-1-5985-3117-6.
- Elliot, Jonathan, ed. (1888). The debates in the several State conventions on the adoption of the Federal Constitution as recommended by the general convention at Philadelphia in 1787. New York, B. Franklin.
- ——, ed. (1888). The debates in the several State conventions on the adoption of the Federal Constitution as recommended by the general convention at Philadelphia in 1787. Vol. II. New York, B. Franklin.
- ——, ed. (1888). The debates in the several State conventions on the adoption of the Federal Constitution as recommended by the general convention at Philadelphia in 1787. Vol. III. New York, B. Franklin.
- ——, ed. (1888). The debates in the several State conventions on the adoption of the Federal Constitution as recommended by the general convention at Philadelphia in 1787. Vol. IV. New York, B. Franklin.
- ——, ed. (1888). The debates in the several State conventions on the adoption of the Federal Constitution as recommended by the general convention at Philadelphia in 1787. Vol. V. New York, B. Franklin.
- Farrand, Max, ed. (1911a) [1787]. The Records of the Federal Convention of 1787. Vol. I. Yale University Press. ISBN 978-0-3000-0080-1.
- ——, ed. (1911b). The Records of the Federal Convention of 1787. Vol. II. Yale University Press. ISBN 978-0-3000-0081-8.
- ——, ed. (1911c). The Records of the Federal Convention of 1787. Vol. III. Yale University Press. ISBN 978-0-3000-0082-5.
- Franklin, Benjamin (Spring 2010). "Constitutional Convention Speech". Litigation. 36 (3). American Bar Association: 64. JSTOR 29760791. (Note: Editor's Note: "Benjamin Franklin's voice was weak so James Wilson read this speech for him on the final day of the Constitutional Convention, Monday, September 17, 1787. Franklin then moved for the adoption of the Constitution.")
- Glynn, George A., ed. (1894). American constitutions, comprising the Declaration of Independence, the Articles of Confederation, the Constitution of the United States, and the state constitutions. Vol. II. Albany, New York: The Argus Company, Printers. "Under the direction of John Palmer, Secretary of State; James A. Roberts; Theo Hancock, New York Attorney-General"
- ——, ed. (1894). American constitutions, comprising the Declaration of Independence, the Articles of Confederation, the Constitution of the United States, and the state constitutions. Vol. II. Albany, New York: The Argus Company, Printers. "Under the direction of John Palmer, Secretary of State; James A. Roberts; Theo Hancock, New York Attorney-General"
- ——, ed. (1911). The Records of the Federal Convention of 1787. Vol. IV. Yale University Press. ISBN 978-0-3000-0082-5.
- Hamilton, Alexander; Madison, James; Jay, John (1982) [1777-1778]. Garry Wills (ed.). The Federalist papers. Toronto and New York: Bantam. ISBN 0-553-21072-6. (Note: Many publications of the Federalist Papers have been printed since they were first released.)
- Friedenwald, Herbert (1897). "The Journals and Papers of the Continental Congress". The Pennsylvania Magazine of History and Biography. 21 (2). University of Pennsylvania Press: 161–184. JSTOR 20085740.
- —— (1897). "The Journals and Papers of the Continental Congress". The Pennsylvania Magazine of History and Biography. 21 (3). University of Pennsylvania Press: 361–375. JSTOR 20085753.
- —— (1897). "The Journals and Papers of the Continental Congress". The Pennsylvania Magazine of History and Biography. 21 (4). University of Pennsylvania Press: 445–465. JSTOR 20085763.
- Hough, Franklin Benjamin (1871). American constitutions: comprising the constitution of each state in the Union, and of the United States, with the Declaration of independence and Articles of confederation. Albany : Weed, Parsons & Company. (Note: "American constitutions : comprising the constitution of each state in the Union, and of the United States, with the Declaration of independence and Articles of confederation; each accompanied by a historical introduction and notes, together with a classified analysis of the constitutions, according to their subjects, showing, by comparative arrangement, every constitutional provision now in force in the several states; with references to judicial decisions, and an analytical index")
- Jefferson, Thomas (1787). Notes on the state of Virginia. London: Printed for John Stockdale. (Note: Jefferson had the Notes published while he was in Paris in 1787, the year of the Constitutional Convention, as a means of sharing his ideas of Republican Constitutionalism and political enlightenment while the Constitution was being debated, drafted and ratified.)
- Jefferson, Thomas (February 6, 1788). "Expressing sentiment that "the new constitution is received with favor"". Letter to James Madison. National Archives: Founders Online.
- Jefferson, Thomas (March 15, 1789). "Declaration of rights". Letter to James Madison. National Archives: Founders Online.
- Jefferson, Thomas (August 28, 1789). "Additions to the declaration of rights (Bill of Rights)". Letter to James Madison. National Archives: Founders Online.
- Jenkins, William Summers, ed. (1837). The diplomatic correspondence of the United States of America. Vol. I. Washington, Printed by Blair & Rives. "From the Signing of the Definitive Treaty of Peace, September 10, 1783 to the Adoption of the Constitution, March 4, 1789." – (This is a work composed of numerous volumes. For complete listing go to Archive.org)
- ——, ed. (1837). The diplomatic correspondence of the United States of America. Vol. II. Washington, Printed by Blair & Rives.
- ——, ed. (1837). The diplomatic correspondence of the United States of America. Vol. III. Washington, Printed by Blair & Rives.
- ——, ed. (1837). The diplomatic correspondence of the United States of America. Vol. IV. Washington, Printed by Blair & Rives.
- ——, ed. (1837). The diplomatic correspondence of the United States of America. Vol. V. Washington, Printed by Blair & Rives.
- ——, ed. (1837). The diplomatic correspondence of the United States of America. Vol. VI. Washington, Printed by Blair & Rives.
- Kaminski, John P.; Saladino, Gaspare J.; Leffler, Richard, eds. (1982). The Documentary History of the Ratification of the Constitution: Ratification of the Constitution by the States: Virginia (1). Vol. 8. Madison, Wisconsin: State Historical Society of Wisconsin. ISBN 978-0-8702-0257-5. OCLC 19749336.
- ——; Saladino, Gaspare J.; Leffler, Richard, eds. (1990). The Documentary History of the Ratification of the Constitution: Ratification of the Constitution by the States: Virginia (2). Vol. 9. Madison, Wisconsin: State Historical Society of Wisconsin. ISBN 978-0-8702-0258-2. OCLC 763003075.
- ——; Saladino, Gaspare J.; Leffler, Richard; Schoenleber, Charles H., eds. (1993). The Documentary History of the Ratification of the Constitution: Ratification of the Constitution by the States: Virginia (3). Vol. 10. Madison, Wisconsin: State Historical Society of Wisconsin. ISBN 0-87020-263-4. OCLC 258057019.
- Kurland, Phillip; Lerner, Ralph, eds. (2001). The Founders' Constitution: Major Themes. Vol. I. Indianapolis: Liberty Fund; University of Chicago Press. (Note: Quote: "The collection brings together an enormous amount of primary source material to illustrate and explain the ideas behind each clause of the U.S. Constitution and Bill of Rights.".)
- ——; ——, eds. (2001). The Founders' Constitution: The Constitution (Part 1). Vol. II. Indianapolis: Liberty Fund; University of Chicago Press.
- ——; ——, eds. (2001). The Founders' Constitution: The Constitution (Part 2). Vol. III. Indianapolis: Liberty Fund; University of Chicago Press.
- ——; ——, eds. (2001). The Founders' Constitution: The Constitution (Part 3). Vol. IV. Indianapolis: Liberty Fund; University of Chicago Press.
- ——; ——, eds. (2001). The Founders' Constitution: Amendments I-XII (Bill of Rights). Vol. V. Indianapolis: Liberty Fund; University of Chicago Press.
- Madison, James (1966) [1840]. Notes of Debates in the Federal Convention of 1787. Athens: Ohio University Press. ISBN 978-0-8214-0011-1.
- ——; Jefferson, Thomas (1965). Basic documents relating to the religious clauses of the First amendment. Washington: Americans United for Separation of Church and State.
- —— (1984). Koch, Adrienne (ed.). Notes of debates in the Federal Convention of 1787. Ohio University Press. (Note: Madison's notes on the Federal Convention have been printed by many publishers.)
- ——; Scott, James Brown (1920). Hunt, Gaillard (ed.). The debates in the Federal convention of 1787, which framed the Constitution of the United States of America. New York; Toronto: Oxford University Press.
- —— (1893). Scott, Erastus Howard (ed.). Journal of the Federal convention. Vol. I. Chicago: Albert, Scott & Co.
- —— (1893). —— (ed.). Journal of the Federal convention. Vol. II. Chicago: Albert, Scott & Co.
- Montesquieu (1955) [1748]. Jean Jacques Rousseau (ed.). The Spirit of Laws: On the Origin of inequality; On Political Economy: The Social Contract. Vol. XXXVIII. Chicago: Encyclopedia Britannica. (Note: Highly influential work frequently referred to by the Founding Fathers while debating and drafting the U. S. Constitution)
- Patterson, William (January 1904) [1787]. "Papers of William Paterson on the Federal Convention, 1787". The American Historical Review. 9 (2). Oxford University Press on behalf of the American Historical Association: 310–340. doi:10.2307/1833369. hdl:2027/loc.ark:/13960/t8cg0fx92. JSTOR 1833369.
- Pierce, William (January 1898) [1787]. "Notes of Major William Pierce on the Federal Convention of 1787". The American Historical Review. 3 (2). Oxford University Press on behalf of the American Historical Association: 310–334. doi:10.2307/1832507. JSTOR 1832507.
- Smith, Adam (1910). Edwin R.A. Seligman (ed.). An Inquiry into the Nature and Causes of the Wealth of Nations. Vol. I. London: J.M. Dent & Sons; New York: E.P. Dutton. (Note: Quote: On the eve of the American Revolution, to be precise, on the ninth of March, 1776, a revolution occurred in the realm of thought: economics emerged as a science. The cause of that revolution was the publication of Adam Smith's The Wealth of Nations".)
- —— (1910). —— (ed.). An Inquiry into the Nature and Causes of the Wealth of Nations. Vol. II. London: J.M. Dent & Sons; New York: E.P. Dutton.
- Smith, Paul Herbert; Gawalt, Gerard W., eds. (1996). Letters of Delegates to Congress, 1774-1789. Vol. 1–26. Library of Congress. ISBN 978-0-8444-0177-5.
- Thomas, Kenneth R.; Eig, Larry M., eds. (2013). The Constitution of the United States of America: analysis and interpretation: analysis of cases decided by the Supreme Court of the United States to June 28, 2012. Washington: Library of Congress: U.S. Government Printing Office.
- Tocqueville, Alexis de (2012) [1840]. Tocqueville Democracy In America. Translated by Goldhammer, Aurthor. Washington D. C.: The Library of Congress.
- Wooton, David, ed. (2003). The Essential Federalist and Anti-Federalist Papers. Indianapolis: Hackett Publishing Company. ISBN 978-1-6038-4439-0. (Note: Also contains notes, selected biographical outlines and speeches made by Federalists and anti-Federalists.)
- United States. Continental Congress (1820). Secret journals of the acts and proceedings of Congress: from the first meeting thereof to the dissolution of the Confederation. Vol. I. Boston: Printed and published by Thomas B. Wait.
- —— (1820). Secret journals of the acts and proceedings of Congress: from the first meeting thereof to the dissolution of the Confederation. Vol. II. Boston: Printed and published by Thomas B. Wait.
- —— (1820). Secret journals of the acts and proceedings of Congress: from the first meeting thereof to the dissolution of the Confederation. Vol. III. Boston: Printed and published by Thomas B. Wait.
- —— (1820). Secret journals of the acts and proceedings of Congress: from the first meeting thereof to the dissolution of the Confederation. Vol. IV. Boston: Printed and published by Thomas B. Wait.

=== Works influential to the Founders ===
Many of the works in this section were authored by members of the Scottish Enlightenment and the English Enlightenment, who were highly influential in the realms of moral and political philosophy and political science. Along with the Bible, their works were routinely cited by James Madison, John Adams, Benjamin Franklin, and other Founding Fathers before and during the drafting of the U. S. Constitution, and during the ratification process. In the years leading up to the framing and signing of the Constitution, Blackstone, Hume, Locke and Montesquieu were among the political philosophers often referred to. (Note: Historian Herbert W. Schneider held that the Scottish Enlightenment was "probably the most potent single tradition in the American Enlightenment" and the advancement of personal liberties.) Historian Jack P. Greene maintains that by 1776 the early Americans drew heavily upon Magna Carta and the later writings of "Enlightenment rationalism" and English common law, while also citing David Hume, an eighteen century Scottish philosopher, (Note: Hume was greatly admired by Benjamin Franklin who read many of his works and visited him at Edinburgh in 1760. Both embraced the idea that high public officials in any of the three branches of government should receive no salary.) who advanced the idea that the lower class was a better judge of character when it came to choosing their representatives. The framers also studied the political philosophies of Plato, Socrates and Aristotle of ancient Greece and those found in ancient Roman Law who advanced the idea of balance of powers.

The Bible was also a major source of influence during the formation period. In an effort to establish an overall perspective of the influence that prevailed among the Founding Fathers, political science professors at the University of Houston engaged in a ten-year study and analyzed over 15,000 writings and speeches by the Founding Fathers to determine the primary source of ideas that went into drafting the Constitution.The study revealed that of all the sources referred to, the Bible and passages from biblical sermons were quoted more than any of the philosophers mentioned above: four times more than Montesquieu, six times more often than Locke, and twelve times more than Blackstone. Approximately ninety-four percent of the quotes taken from the Founders quoted the Bible directly or made analogies to specific chapters and verses and various quotes taken from religious sermons. John Adams specifically credited Reverends Jonathan Mayhew alongside George Whitefield, Samuel Cooper, and others such clergymen as foundational in awakening the American principles that led to independence.

- Holy Bible : 1611 King James Version. Grand Rapids, Mich. : Zondervan. 2008.
- Blackstone, William (1768–1770) [1765–1769]. The Commentaries on the Laws of England of Sir William Blackstone (Four volumes). London: Oxford, Clarendon Press. Volume I, Volume II, Volume III, Volume IV
- Eidsmoe, John (1995). Christianity and the constitution : the faith of our founding fathers. Grand Rapids, Mich.: Baker Book House. ISBN 978-0-80105-2316.
- Grotius, Hugo (1738) [1625]. The Rights of War and Peace, in Three Books: Wherein Are Explained the Law of Nature and Nations, and the Principal Points Relating to Government. London: Printed for W. Innys and R. Manby, J. and P. Knapton, D. Brown, T. Osborn, and E. Wicksteed.
- Hume, David (1854) [1777]. The Philosophical Works of David Hume (four volumes). Boston, MA: Little, Brown and Company. Volume I, Volume II, Volume III, Volume IV
- Locke, John (1764) [1689]. Two Treatises of Government by John Locke. London: A. Millar, H. Woodfall, I. Whiston and B. White, I. Rivington, L. Davis and C. Reymers (and 16 others).
- —— (1872) [1689-1706]. The Works of John Locke in Two Volumes. London: Bell & Daldy. Volume I, Volume II
- Montesquieu, Baron De. Hon. Frederic R. Coudert (ed.). The Spirit of Laws (Two volumes). Translated by Nugent, Thomas. New York: The Colonial Press. Volume I, Volume II
- Paine, Thomas (1942) [1776]. Basic writings of Thomas Paine: Common sense, Rights of Man, Age of Reason. New York: Willey Book Company. (Note: The political writings of Thomas Paine were very influential in criticizing British Parliament and advancing the ideas of natural rights and separation of religion from government. Common Sense is considered one of the most volatile works of the Revolutionary era. See also: Rights of Man, The Age of Reason)
- Plato (1974) [circa 380 B.C.E.]. The Republic. Translated by Grube, G.M.A. Indianapolis, IN: Hackett Publishing Company.
- Smith, Adam (1776). An Inquiry into the Nature and Causes of the Wealth of Nations (Two volumes). London: Printed for W. Strahan; and T. Cadell, in the Strand. Volume I, Volume II
- Some historians hold that the laws and principles in the Great Law of Peace governing the Iroquois Confederacy, admired by Benjamin Franklin and Thomas Jefferson, had a significant influence in shaping the Articles of Confederation and the Constitution of the United States, a theory often referred to as the Iroquois Thesis. (Note: Support for the Iroquois Thesis is largely based on the similarities that existed between the Iroquois Confederacy and the political philosophies embraced by the Founders, which include the ideas that leaders are servants of the people, states within states v tribes within the Confederacy, and a respect for diversity of beliefs or religions among leaders and different groups of people.) While similarities exist, there is no established consensus, however, to support any significant influence the Iroquois may have had on the founder's thinking. (Note: See also: Iroquois#Influence on the United States) while there is significant disagreement among other historians and archeologists as to the extent of any such influence. (Note: Elisabeth Tooker, professor of anthropology, maintains that, "...there is little in this system of governance, the founding fathers might have been expected to copy. It is doubtful, for example, that the delegates to the Constitutional Convention ... would have proposed a system under which only their relatives could become members of Congress, and a system under which each legislator was chosen by a close female relative of the previous holder of the office", which is how the Chiefs of the Iroquois Confederacy were chosen. i.e.Hereditary rule.)
Top

== James Madison ==
James Madison is widely recognized among Constitutional scholars for his key role in drafting and promoting the Constitution of the United States and the Bill of Rights. Gouverneur Morris also played a significant role, writing the Preamble and various other provisions. Historians Saul Padover and Jacob Landynski maintain that "...the American Constitution, for which Madison, more than any other single individual, was mainly responsible. It was Madison who gave the Constitution its basic shape, its essential conservatism, and yet flexibility sufficient to meet the changing needs of future times." For his key role Madison is commonly known as The Father of the Constitution. However, some historians don't share this view entirely, based on various issues. In his own lifetime Madison was hailed as the "Father of the Constitution". (Note: Though Madison played a key role in drafting the Constitution, and at the Constitutional Convention, he was reluctant to accept such praise, and once replied, "You give me a credit to which I have no claim, in calling me 'The writer of the Constitution of the U. S." maintaining it was the product of "many heads & many hands".)

- Banning, Lance (1995). The sacred fire of liberty: James Madison and the founding of the federal republic. Cornell University Press. ISBN 978-0-8014-8524-4.
- Bilder, Mary Sarah (2015). Madison's Hand: Revising the Constitutional Convention. Harvard University Press. ISBN 978-0-6744-9550-0.
- Bordewich, Fergus M. (2016). The First Congress: How James Madison, George Washington, and a Group of Extraordinary Men Invented the Government. Simon & Schuster. ISBN 978-1-4516-9193-1.
- Brant, Irving (1965). The Bill of rights; its origin and meaning. Indianapolis, Bobbs-Merrill.
- —— (1968). James Madison and American Nationalism. Van Nostrand.
- —— (1950). James Madison: Father of the Constitution, 1787-1800. Indianapolis, IN: Bobbs-Merrill.
- Burns, Edward McNall (1968) [1938]. James Madison, Philosopher of the Constitution. New York: Octagon Books, Inc.
- Gutzman, Kevin Raeder (2012). James Madison and the making of America. New York: St. Martin's Press. ISBN 978-0-3126-2500-9.
- Hunt, Gaillard (1902). The Life of James Madison. New York: Doubleday, Page & Co. (Note: This biography concentrates on Madison's involvement with the Bill of Rights, The Annapolis Convention, religious liberty, preparation for and involvement at the Federal Convention, along with numerous references to the Constitution.)
- Koch, Adrienne (1964). Jefferson and Madison: the great collaboration. New York: Oxford University Press. ISBN 978-0-1950-0420-5.
- Labunski, Richard (2006). James Madison and the Struggle for the Bill of Rights. Oxford Univ. Press.
- Rakove, Jack N. (1990). Handlin, Oscar (ed.). James Madison and the creation of the American Republic. Glenview, Illinois: Scott, Foresman/Little, Brown Higher Education. ISBN 978-0-3214-3076-2.
- Riemer, Neal (1986). James Madison: Creating the American Constitution. Congressional Quarterly. ISBN 978-0-87187-405-4.
- Scarberry, Mark S. (April 2009). "John Leland and James Madison: Religious Influence on the Ratification of the Constitution and on the Proposal of the Bill of Rights". Penn State Law Review. 113 (3): 733–800.
- Scott, James Brown (1918). James Madison's Notes of Debates in the Federal Convention of 1787 and Their Relation to a More Perfect Society of Nations. Union, N.J.: Lawbook Exchange.
- Sheldon, Garrett Ward (2001). The political philosophy of James Madison. Johns Hopkins University Press. ISBN 978-0-8018-64797. "Among the Founders, James Madison wielded the greatest influence in drafting the constitution of 1789. In this book, Garrett Ward Sheldon offers a concise synthesis of Madison's political philosophy in the context of the social and political history of his day."
- Sorenson, Leonard R. (1995). Madison on the General Welfare of America: His Consistent Constitutional Vision. Rowman & Littlefield Publishers.
- Weiner, Greg (2012). Madison's Metronome: The Constitution, Majority Rule, and the Tempo of American Politics. University Press of Kansas. ISBN 978-0-70062-8957.

=== Journals 4 ===
- Adair, Douglass (April 1945). "James Madison's Autobiography". The William and Mary Quarterly. 2 (2). Omohundro Institute of Early American History and Culture: 191–209. doi:10.2307/1923519. JSTOR 1923519.
- Arkin, Marc M. (August 1995). ""The Intractable Principle:" David Hume, James Madison, Religion, and the Tenth Federalist". The American Journal of Legal History. 39 (2). Oxford University Press: 148–176. doi:10.2307/845899. JSTOR 845899.
- Ashin, Mark (October 1953). "The Argument of Madison's "Federalist," No. 10". College English. 15 (1). National Council of Teachers of English: 37–45. doi:10.2307/371602. JSTOR 371602.
- Banning, Lance (April 1983). "James Madison and the Nationalists, 1780-1783". The William and Mary Quarterly. 40 (2). Omohundro Institute of Early American History and Culture: 227–255. doi:10.2307/1916879. JSTOR 1916879.
- Branson, Roy (April–June 1979). "James Madison and the Scottish Enlightenment". Journal of the History of Ideas. 40 (2). University of Pennsylvania Press: 235–250. doi:10.2307/2709150. JSTOR 2709150.
- Brant, Irving (January 1951). "Madison: On the Separation of Church and State". The William and Mary Quarterly. 8 (1). Omohundro Institute of Early American History and Culture: 3–24. doi:10.2307/1920731. JSTOR 1920731.
- Broadwater, Jeff (2015). "James Madison and the Constitution: Reassessing the "Madison Problem"". The Virginia Magazine of History and Biography. 123 (3): 202–235. JSTOR 26322533.
- Conniff, James (August 1980). "The Enlightenment and American Political Thought: A Study of the Origins of Madison's Federalist Number 10". Political Theory. 8 (2). Sage Publications, Inc.: University of Utah.: 381–402. doi:10.1177/009059178000800307. JSTOR 190920. S2CID 148673852.
- Greene, Francis R. (Winter 1994). "Madison's View of Federalism in "The Federalist"". Publius. 24 (1). Oxford University Press: 47–61. JSTOR 3330704.
- Houpt, D. (2010). "Securing a Legacy: The Publication of James Madison's Notes from the Constitutional Convention". The Virginia Magazine of History and Biography. 118 (1): 4–39. JSTOR 40601163.
- Howard, A. E. Dick (Summer 1985). "James Madison and the Constitution". The Wilson Quarterly. 9 (3): 80–91. JSTOR 40256894.
- Konig, David Thomas (May 2010). "James Madison and Common-Law Constitutionalism". Law and History Review. 28 (2): 507–514. doi:10.1017/S0738248010000076. JSTOR 25701111. S2CID 146349114.
- Leibiger, Stuart (August 1993). "James Madison and Amendments to the Constitution, 1787-1789: "Parchment Barriers"". The Journal of Southern History. 59 (3). Southern Historical Association: 441–468. doi:10.2307/2210003. JSTOR 2210003.
- Morgan, Robert J. (December 1974). "Madison's Theory of Representation in the Tenth Federalist". The Journal of Politics. 36 (4). The University of Chicago Press: 852–885. doi:10.2307/2129398. JSTOR 2129398. S2CID 153496620.
- Muñoz, Vincent Phillip (February 2003). "James Madison's Principle of Religious Liberty". The American Political Science Review. 97 (1). American Political Science Association.: 17–32. doi:10.1017/S0003055403000492. JSTOR 3118218. S2CID 73579783.
- Rakove, Jack N. (Fall 1992). "James Madison and the Bill of Rights: A Broader Context". Presidential Studies Quarterly. 22 (4). Wiley on behalf of the Center for the Study of the Presidency and Congress: 667–677. JSTOR 27551030.
- Read, James H. (August 1995). ""Our Complicated System": James Madison on Power and Liberty". Political Theory. 23 (3). Sage Publications, Inc.: University of Utah: 452–475. doi:10.1177/0090591795023003003. JSTOR 191753. S2CID 145077604.
- Riemer, Neal (March 1954). "The Republicanism of James Madison". Political Science Quarterly. 69 (1). Oxford University Press.: 45–64. doi:10.2307/2145057. JSTOR 2145057.
- Robertson, David Brian (May 2005). "Madison's Opponents and Constitutional Design". The American Political Science Review. 99 (2). American Political Science Association: 225–243. doi:10.1017/S0003055405051622. JSTOR 30038934. S2CID 145374045.
- Rosenbloom, David H. (December 2011). "Federalist No. 10: How Do Factions Affect the President as Administrator-in-Chief?". Public Administration Review. 71. Wiley; The American Society for Public Administration: s22–s28. doi:10.1111/j.1540-6210.2011.02458.x. JSTOR 41317413.
- Scarberry, Mark S. (April 2009). "John Leland and James Madison: Religious Influence on the Ratification of the Constitution and on the Proposal of the Bill of Rights". Penn State Law Review. 113 (3): 733–800.
- Schultz, Harold S. (Spring 1980). "James Madison: Father of the Constitution?". The Quarterly Journal of the Library of Congress. 37 (2). Library of Congress: 215–222. JSTOR 29781852.
- Sikkenga, Jeffrey (July 2012). "Government Has No "Religious Agency": James Madison's Fundamental Principle of Religious Liberty". American Journal of Political Science. 56 (3). Midwest Political Science Association: 745–756. doi:10.1111/j.1540-5907.2011.00581.x. JSTOR 23316018.
- Tate, Adam (Fall 2013). "James Madison and State Sovereignty, 1780–1781". American Political Thought. 2 (2). The University of Chicago Press - Notre Dame Program in Constitutional Studies - The Jack Miller Center: 174–197. doi:10.1086/673130. JSTOR 10.1086/673130. S2CID 154021009.
- Weiner, Greg (Fall 2013). "James Madison and the Legitimacy of Majority Factions". American Political Thought. 2 (2). The University of Chicago Press: 196–216. doi:10.1086/673131. JSTOR 673131. S2CID 153749919.
- Rumble, Wilfrid E. (1979). "James Madison on the Value of the Bill of Rights". Constitutionalism. Nomos XX. Vol. 20. American Society for Political and Legal Philosophy. pp. 122–162. JSTOR 24219130.

=== Madison correspondence ===
During the period just prior to and during the Constitutional Convention James Madison corresponded with Thomas Jefferson, who was in Paris serving as American Minister to France, and who.had requested that Madison keep him informed of the proceedings during the Constitutional Convention. (Note: While in Paris, Jefferson sent a fair number of works on the French Enlightenment to Madison.) During this time Madison also corresponded with John Adams, in London, (Note: While in London Adams wrote his three-volume A Defense of the Constitutions of Government of the United States of America.) George Washington, James Monroe, and others, about general developments during the convention and other related matters. Because Madison, like others at the convention, was bound by the secrecy rule, which Jefferson found disquieting, only reports about the arrival of delegates, the general progress of the convention, general recommendations and other such nominal information was exchanged through correspondence. Correspondence of this nature is included in this section.

- Jefferson, Thomas; Madison, James (1995). Smith, James Morton (ed.). The republic of letters: the correspondence between Thomas Jefferson and James Madison, 1776-1826. Vol. I. New York : Norton. ISBN 978-0-3930-3691-6.
- ——; —— (1995). —— (ed.). The republic of letters: the correspondence between Thomas Jefferson and James Madison, 1776-1826. Vol. II. New York : Norton. ISBN 978-0-3930-3691-6.
- ——; —— (1995). —— (ed.). The republic of letters: the correspondence between Thomas Jefferson and James Madison, 1776-1826. Vol. III. New York : Norton. ISBN 978-0-3930-3691-6.
- Madison, James (May 15, 1787). "An account of the delegates who have arrived at the Convention in Philadelphia as of May 1787". Letter to Thomas Jefferson. National Archives.
- —— (June 6, 1787). "Constitutional Convention, Secrecy rule, names of delegates in attendance". Letter to Thomas Jefferson. National Archives.
- James, Madison (June 10, 1787). "Explanation of secrecy rule to James Monroe". Letter to James Monroe. National Archives.
- —— (June 20, 1787). "Separation of Powers, Resolution of Congress for appointing an Executive committee". Letter to James Madison. National Archives.
- —— (October 24, 1787). "Reporting on the state of affairs regarding state delegates. Expresses concern that the Constitution may fall short of keeping the states in line". Letter to Thomas Jefferson. National Archives.
- —— (September 30, 1787). "Madison's account re Congress accepting the new Constitution over the Articles of Confederation". Letter to George Washington. Founders online.
- —— (July 31, 1788). "Jefferson's approval of the ratification, recommends a Bill of Rights, etc". Letter to James Madison. National Archives.
- —— (October 17, 1788). "U. S. Constitution matters". Letter to Thomas Jefferson. Founders online.
- —— (December 9, 1787). "Constitutional Convention, final phases". Letter to Thomas Jefferson. National Archives.
- Jefferson, Thomas (December 20, 1787). "Jefferson's thoughts on the benefits of three branches of government". Letter to James Madison. Paris: National Archives.
- —— (December 20, 1787). "Bill of Rights". Letter to James Madison. National Constitution Center. (Note: Original source: The Papers of Thomas Jefferson, vol. 15, 27 March 1789 – 30 November 1789, ed. Julian P. Boyd. Princeton: Princeton University Press, 1958, pp. 364–369)
Top

== Slavery and the Constitution ==
According to James Madison, the source of greatest disagreement between the states in framing the U.S. Constitution was the issue of slavery. The differences profoundly affected the final document, which included five provisions that protected slavery directly and another five, indirectly. So deep was the division that it threatened the Constitution's passage, in fact, the union itself, and over the next 70 years, slavery would grow into the nation's defining issue, eventually resulting in the American Civil War.

As various states refused to ratify a Constitution that prohibited slavery, various provisions were adapted to assure ratification by all the states. (Note: The Three-fifths Compromise and the Fugitive Slave Clause were among some of the provisions.) Though Congress was allowed to prohibit the foreign slave trade, beginning in 1808, the issue of slavery did not become a Constitutional mandate over the states, with each state deciding whether it would allow the institution of slavery to exist within its borders. Emancipation gradually continued in the northern and middle states, however, slavery would thrive and expand in the southern states. As a result, the number of slaves in the U.S. would increase from about 700,000 in 1790 to nearly four million at the outbreak of the Civil War.

- American anti-slavery society (1853). Platform of the American anti-slavery society and its auxiliaries. New York, N.Y.: Anti-slavery society. (Note: Work contains many references to the various Articles in the Constitution.)
- Blackburn, Robin (2011). The American Crucible: Slavery, Emancipation and Human Rights. London; New York: Verso. ISBN 978-1-84467-569-2.
- Brewster, Francis E. (1850). Slavery and the Constitution. Both Sides of the Question. Philadelphia: Unknown Publisher.
- Bowditch, William Ingersol (1849). Slavery and the Constitution. Boston: Robert F. Wallcut.
- Drake, Charles E. (September 17, 1862). The War of Slavery upon the Constitution: Address of Charles E. Drake on the Anniversary of the Constitution Delivered in St. Louis. [St. Louis?.
- Finkelman, Paul (1981). An Imperfect Union: Slavery, Federalism, and Comity. Chapel Hill, NC: University of North Carolina Press. ISBN 0-8078-1438-5.
- —— (1996). Slavery and the Founders: Race and Liberty in the Age of Jefferson. Armonk, NY: M.E. Sharpe. ISBN 978-1-56324-590-9.
- Goldstone, Lawrence (2005). Dark Bargain: Slavery, Profits, and the Struggle for the Constitution. New York: Walker & Company. ISBN 0-8027-1460-9.
- Goldwin, Robert A.; Kaufman, Art, eds. (1988). Slavery and Its Consequences: The Constitution, Equality, and Race. Washington, DC: American Enterprise Institute for Public Policy Research. ISBN 0-8447-3649-X.
- Granger, Amos Phelps (1859). State sovereignty--the Constitution--slavery. Washington: Library of Congress.
- Jack, Charles James (1860). A political lecture upon the "influence of slavery on the Constitution and Union". Brooklyn: E.B. Spooner, steam book and job printer.
- Jordan, Winthrop D. (1968). White Over Black: American Attitudes Toward the Negro 1550-1812. Chapel Hill, NC: The University of North Carolina Press.
- Kaminski, John P., ed. (1995). A Necessary Evil?: Slavery and the Debate over the Constitution. Madison, WI: Madison House. ISBN 978-0945-61216-2.
- Lively, Donald E. (1992). The Constitution and Race. New York: Praeger. ISBN 0-275-93914-6.
- Lynd, Staughton (June 1966). "The Compromise of 1787". Political Science Quarterly. 81 (2). Oxford University Press: 225–250. doi:10.2307/2147971. JSTOR 2147971.
- —— (1967). Class Conflict, Slavery, and the United States Constitution: Ten Essays. Indianapolis: Bobbs-Merrill. ISBN 978-0-5211-1484-4.
- McColley, Robert (1964). Slavery and Jeffersonian Virginia. Urbana, IL: University of Illinois Press.
- Robinson, Donald L. (1970). Slavery in the Structure of American Politics, 1765-1820. New York: Harcourt Brace Jovanovich. ISBN 0-15-182972-1.
- Richardson, Nathaniel Smith (1864). The Union, the Constitution, and slavery. New York: Bible House.
- Spooner, Lysander (1846). The unconstitutionality of slavery (Vol. 1 & 2). Boston: Bela Marsh. (Note: Reprinted in 1860, by Burt Franklin; 2019, by Madison and Adams Press)
- Van Cleve, George William (2010). A Slaveholders' Union: Slavery, Politics, and the Constitution in the Early American Republic. Chicago: University of Chicago Press. ISBN 978-0-226-84668-2.
- Waldstreicher, David (2009). Slavery's Constitution: From Revolution to Ratification. Chicago: The University of Chicago Press. ISBN 978-0-8090-9453-0.
- Wiecek, William M. (1977). The Sources of Antislavery Constitutionalism in America, 1760-1848. Ithaca, NY: Cornell University Press. ISBN 0-8014-1089-4.
- Zilversmit, Arthur (1967). The First Emancipation: The Abolition of Slavery in the North. Chicago: University of Chicago Press.

=== Journals 5 ===
- Amar, Akhil Reed (April 1992). "The Bill of Rights and the Fourteenth Amendment". The Yale Law Journal. 10 (6). The Yale Law Journal Company, Inc.: 1193–1284. doi:10.2307/796923. JSTOR 796923.
- Berns, Walter (1968). "The Constitution and the Migration of Slaves". The Yale Law Journal. 78 (2): 198–228. doi:10.2307/795062. JSTOR 795062.
- David, C. W. A. (January 1924). "The Fugitive Slave Law of 1793 and its Antecedents". The Journal of Negro History. 9 (1). The University of Chicago Press on behalf of the Association for the Study of African American Life and History: 18–25. doi:10.2307/2713433. JSTOR 2713433. S2CID 149160543.
- Dougherty, Keith L.; Heckelman, Jac C. (2008). "Voting on Slavery at the Constitutional Convention". Public Choice. 136 (3/4): 293–313. doi:10.1007/s11127-008-9297-7. JSTOR 40270762. S2CID 14103553.
- Einhorn, Robin L. (Winter 2002). "Patrick Henry's Case against the Constitution: The Structural Problem with Slavery". Journal of the Early Republic. 22 (4). University of Pennsylvania Press on behalf of the Society for Historians of the Early American Republic: 549–573. doi:10.2307/3124758. JSTOR 3124758.
- —— (2008). "Slavery". Enterprise & Society. 9 (3): 491–506. doi:10.1093/es/khn043. JSTOR 23701168.
- Finkelman, Paul (Winter 2000). "Garrison's Constitution: The Covenant with Death and How It Was Made". Prologue Magazine. 32 (4). National Archives.
- —— (2001). "The Founders and Slavery: Little Ventured, Little Gained". Yale Journal of Law & the Humanities. 13 (2): 413–449. SSRN 1432083.
- —— (April 2011). "Slavery, the Constitution, and the Origins of the Civil War". OAH Magazine of History. 25 (2). Oxford University Press: 14–18. doi:10.1093/oahmag/oar004. JSTOR 23210240.
- Freehling, William W. (February 1972). "The Founding Fathers and Slavery". The American Historical Review. 77 (1). Oxford University Press: 81–93. doi:10.2307/1856595. JSTOR 1856595.
- Gordon-Reed, Annette (January 2000). "Engaging Jefferson: Blacks and the Founding Father". The William and Mary Quarterly. 57 (1). Omohundro Institute of Early American History and Culture: 171–182. doi:10.2307/2674364. JSTOR 2674364. PMID 18273995.
- Jacobus, tenBroek (June 1951). "Thirteenth Amendment to the Constitution of the United States: Consummation to Abolition and Key to the Fourteenth Amendment". California Law Review. 39 (2). California Law Review, Inc.: 171–203. doi:10.2307/3478033. JSTOR 3478033. Archived from the original on November 13, 2019.
- Johnson, Allen (December 1921). "The Constitutionality of the Fugitive Slave Acts". The Yale Law Journal. 31 (2). The Yale Law Journal Co., Inc: 191–182. doi:10.2307/789306. JSTOR 789306.
- Knowles, Hellen J. (August 2013). "Seeing the Light: Lysander Spooner's Increasingly Popular Constitutionalism". Law and History Review. 31 (3). American Society for Legal History: 531–558. doi:10.1017/S0738248013000242. JSTOR 23489502. S2CID 146391068.
- Lawson, Bill E. (1997). "Property or Persons: On a "Plain Reading" of the United States Constitution". The Journal of Ethics. 1 (3). Springer: 291–303. doi:10.1017/S0738248013000242. JSTOR 25115552. S2CID 146391068.
- Maltz, Earl M. (October 1992). "Slavery, Federalism, and the Structure of the Constitution". The American Journal of Legal History. 36 (4). Oxford University Press: 466–498. doi:10.2307/845555. JSTOR 845555.
- Patterson, Orlando (Autumn 1987). "The Unholy Trinity: Freedom, Slavery, and the American Constitution". Social Research. 54 (3). The Johns Hopkins University Press: 543–577. JSTOR 40970472.
- Scott, Daryl Michael (2020). "The Social and Intellectual Origins of 13thism". Fire!!!. 5 (2): 2–39. JSTOR 10.5323/48573836.
- Torodash, Martin (Summer 1971). "Constitutional Aspects of Slavery". The Georgia Historical Quarterly. 55 (2). Georgia Historical Society: 234–247. JSTOR 40579276.
- Wiecek, William M. (1977). "The Ambiguous Beginnings of Antislavery Constitutionalism". The Ambiguous Beginnings of Antislavery Constitutionalism: Somerset. Cornell University Press. pp. 20–39. ISBN 978-1-50172-6446. JSTOR 10.7591/j.ctt207g6m0.6.
Top

== See also ==
- Bibliography of Benjamin Franklin
- Bibliography of George Washington
- Bibliography of Thomas Jefferson
- The Constitution of the United States of America: Analysis and Interpretation
- Founders Online (Note: Provides an extensive selection of correspondence and other papers of famous presidents and other historically notable Founding figures.)
- Founding Fathers of the United States
- History of the United States Constitution
- List of bibliographies on American history
- List of clauses of the United States Constitution
- Timeline of drafting and ratification of the United States Constitution
- Virginia Plan—Madison's proposed draft of Constitutional structure

== Sources ==
- Adams, John (1819). Political essays : published in the years 1774 and 1775, on the principal points of controversy, between Great Britain and her colonies. Boston: Hews & Goss.
- Armstrong, Virginia Irving (1971). I Have Spoken: American History Through the Voices of the Indians. Swallow Press. p. 14. ISBN 978-0-8040-0530-2.
- Bowers, Claude (1945). The Young Jefferson 1743–1789. Houghton Mifflin Company.
- Cohen, Felix S. (Spring 1952). "Americanizing the White Man". The American Scholar. 21 (2). The Phi Beta Kappa Society: 177–191. JSTOR 41206885.
- Eidsmoe, John (1995). Christianity and the constitution: the faith of our founding fathers. Grand Rapids: Michigan Baker Book House. ISBN 978-0-8010-5231-6.
- Feldman, Noah (2017). The Three Lives of James Madison: Genius, Partisan, President. New York: Random House. ISBN 978-0-8129-9275-5.
- Gilbert, Chinard (1964). Honest John Adams. Boston: Little, Brown.
- Hacker, J. David (May 13, 2020). "From '20 and Odd' to 10 million: The Growth of the Slave Population in the United States". Slavery & Abolition. 41 (4): 840–855. doi:10.1080/0144039x.2020.1755502. PMC 7716878. PMID 33281246.
- Holdsworth, William Searle (February 1928). "Sir William Blackstone". Oregon Law Review. 7 (1): 155–163. ISSN 0196-2043.
- "The Founders Constitution". The Liberty Fund; University of Chicago Press. 2021.
- Lillback, Peter (2008). A. Wall of misconception : does the separation of church and state mean the separation of God and government?. West Conshocken, Pa. : Providence Forum. ISBN 978-0-97860-5230.
- McCullough, David G. (2001). John Adams. New York: Simon & Schuster. ISBN 978-0-74321-8290.
- Page, Anthony; Prest, Wilfrid R. (2018). Blackstone and His Critics. Oxford: Bloomsbury Publishing. ISBN 978-1-5099-1045-8. OCLC 1012615943.
- Paolucci, Henry (2004). Lectures on Roman History. Griffon House Publications for the Bagehot Council. ISBN 1-932107-06-1.
- Richards, Leonard L. (2014). Shays's Rebellion: The American Revolution's Final Battle. University of Pennsylvania Press. ISBN 978-0-81220-3196.
- Smith, Adam (1961). The Wealth of Nations. The Bobbs-Merrill Company.
- Wood, Gordon S. (2002). The American Revolution: A History. New York: Modern Library. ISBN 0-679-64057-6.
- Wood, Gordon S. (2006). Revolutionary Characters: What Made the Founders Different. New York: Penguin Press. ISBN 1-59420-093-9.
- "Congressional Record, Volume 147". Congressional Record, Volume 147 (2001), Part 14. 2001. pp. 20220–20225.
