= Bibliography of Thomas Jefferson =

The bibliography of Thomas Jefferson refers to published works about Thomas Jefferson, the primary author of the Declaration of Independence and the third president of the United States. Biographical and political accounts for Jefferson now span across three centuries.

Up until 1851, virtually all biographical accounts for Jefferson relied on general and common knowledge gained from official records and public writings and newspapers. Henry S. Randall—the first historian allowed to interview Jefferson's family, giving him access to family letters and records—did biographies of Jefferson take on a more intimate perspective. Randall wrote an 1858 three-volume biography which set the premise for many biographies that followed. Before Randall, George Tucker produced his two-volume 1837 account of Jefferson which offered a glint of insight into Jefferson's personal life. Following Jefferson's death he was roundly criticized by the Christian Clergy for his Bible and other writings. Tucker was the first notable historian to explore Jefferson's religious life from a biographical perspective.

Though scrutinized by some historians before, during the 1960s civil rights era, historians, many of them with political and social motivations, began criticizing Jefferson for owning slaves and his racial views. While some of their accounts were unforgiving with their often selective points of view, others have noted that Jefferson, while owning slaves and reluctant to release them into freedom unprepared, was among the first of his time to advance the idea of equality and freedom for the African descendants enslaved in the new world. Many of the older biographical works are now in the public domain and often available online in their entirety in the form of e-books, while later publications whose copyrights are still valid can often be partially viewed on the internet.

== Jefferson overview ==
Thomas Jefferson (April 13, 1743 – July 4, 1826) was an American Founding Father, the principal author of the Declaration of Independence (1776) and the third president of the United States (1801–1809). He served in the Continental Congress, and as a wartime Governor of Virginia (1779–1781). From mid-1784 Jefferson served as a diplomat, stationed in Paris. In May 1785, he became the United States Minister to France.

Jefferson was the first United States Secretary of State (1790–1793) serving under President George Washington. Jefferson and James Madison, organized the Democratic-Republican Party, and subsequently resigned from Washington's cabinet. He was elected vice president in 1796. He wrote the Kentucky and Virginia Resolutions, which attempted to nullify the Alien and Sedition Acts.

As president Jefferson promoted and authorized the Louisiana Purchase from France (1803), and sent the Lewis and Clark Expedition (1804–1806) to explore the new west. His vice president, Aaron Burr, was tried for treason. Hoping to avert war he attempted economic warfare against Britain with his embargo laws. In 1807 he drafted and signed into law a bill banning the importation of slaves into the United States.

Jefferson was a leader in the Enlightenment. He founded the University of Virginia after his presidency. He designed his own large mansion at Monticello and the University of Virginia building. Jefferson was a skilled writer and corresponded with many influential people in America and Europe throughout his adult life. His letters number in the many thousands and are used extensively as references for nearly all works on Jefferson.

=== Bernard Bailyn on the Jefferson Papers ===
Historian Bernard Bailyn perused the Jefferson Papers after 1760 and concluded---in "Boyd's Jefferson: Notes for a Sketch" (1960)---that the documents revealed two defining Jeffersonian characteristics. The first was "liberal conventionality," which partly conformed with Carl L. Becker's appraisals of Jeffersonian "liberalism" in The Declaration of Independence: A Study in the History of Political Ideas (1922). Becker's interpretations of Jeffersonian "liberalism" in drafts of The Declaration of Independence (1776) evinced a change from Becker's Progressive Era social liberalism to questioning, particularly after the First Red Scare, the relevance of any natural rights philosophy to early twentieth-century modernities and imperialism, all in the context of fledgling formulations of Jeffersonian democracy. Whether Bailyn anachronistically construed the shift in Becker's interpretations as nascent (more than the dreaded "proto-") Cold War liberalism requires further scholarly inquiry. Bailyn nevertheless added that this Jeffersonian "liberal conventionality" frequently lapsed into the "superficial" and "simple." As an example, Bailyn compared James Madison's contentions in the Virginia Plan and The Federalist Papers to those of Jefferson, who "saw the problem in traditional liberal terms, as [only] a dilemma created by the necessity to increase the powers of the national government and the threat that such powers would constitute to the liberties of the people." Jefferson, in his "liberal conventionality" vis-à-vis the "function of bills of rights," believed that "the real threats to liberty in a republican government come not from the power of the state as such but from 'overbearing majorities.' " Another example was Jefferson's conception of the French Revolution. "It was this liberal conventionality," Bailyn decided, that "engrossed his attention" on French Revolutionary aims to "remodel the institutions of government to conform to enlightenment principles. All else---the latent, irrational elements involved in a social upheaval: the powerful resistance of entrenched privilege, the capricious violence of enflamed mobs, the irresponsibility of demagogues---took him by surprise...Jefferson may have been convinced by his own argument that 'vices in the form of government' lay at the heart of Europe's miseries, but others---more consistent empiricists, more original, dissatisfied, quizzical minds---were not."

A second characteristic spurred a challenge to Carl L. Becker's thesis on an ancillary front. In Bailyn's estimation, Thomas Jefferson proved a "superb 'man of business' " which furthered "plans of his own, plans calculated to advance the cause of America, enlightenment, and liberty." Bailyn subsequently questioned the prevailing "view that Jefferson's 'convictions, his sympathies, his ideas are essentially of the intellect, somehow curiously abstracted from reality'...this conclusion of Becker's appears considerably overdrawn even as it relates to the Declaration; as a general description of Jefferson's personality it is utterly mistaken." Bailyn depicted a deft Jefferson transitioning, time and time again, from fiscal and monetary proposals for "public debt" reduction to those decisions in public commerce and private "finance" that so impressed John Adams. Bailyn also cast Jefferson as an "excellent ambassador" for "American commerce," citing his successful efforts to "re-open the markets for American whale oil" and challenges against the "farmers-general's monopolistic control of French imports of American tobacco." As a result, "Madison, next to whose comments on constitutional principle and theory Jefferson's remarks were rigid and obvious, found his opinion of men and measures penetrating and reliable."

Bailyn's conclusion advanced elements of what became The Ideological Origins of the American Revolution as well as Gordon S. Wood's "Rhetoric and Reality in the American Revolution" (1966). The dual characteristics failed to consistently occupy separate spheres in Thomas Jefferson's writings---often, according to Bailyn, they were a dyadic pair rather than solely correlative. Before Jefferson embarked for Europe in 1784, Bailyn argued, the "means" of the American Revolution had been "necessarily subordinated to the end of survival, and the most effective ideas were the most ideological, the most universally evocative of idealism and self-sacrifice. In this situation of flux the conflict between self-sufficient abstractions and material and social reality was at a minimum." But after 1784, these characteristics increasingly came into conflict as debates over "effective ideas" at their "most ideological" shifted the American Revolution in a different direction(s). Jefferson, for instance, began to study more conceptual underpinnings of the federal Constitution than his initial "dilemma," especially as "he came to grips with the concrete problems, learned more of the political battles that had taken place in the convention, and became caught up, even at such a distance, in the campaign for ratification." Yet, "at other times, as in his involvement in the early stages of the French Revolution, this weak integration of contrasting characteristics led to simultaneous but quite different responses at different levels of activity. At still other times, as in the negotiation of commercial arrangements, it led to an appearance of applying different principles to similar circumstances. It could easily result in apparent inconsistencies which animosity could construe as hypocrisy." These "problems" appeared more manifest after "the conflict between self-sufficient abstractions and material and social reality" was no longer "at a minimum." The "problems" were not only features of an "important biography; they are elements of our national history."

== Legend ==
Sources and publications for Jefferson have emerged for more than 200 years and at this late date there exist many hundreds of them. As such this bibliography, though extensive, is by no means complete at this time. This bibliography also contains books whose titles and subjects are not devoted to Thomas Jefferson per se, but whose content covers the subject of Jefferson well enough for their inclusion in this bibliography.

Format used for listing publications:
Lastname, Firstname; (1900). Title of book in italics, Publisher, Location, 123 pages; ISBN 123-4-5678-9012-3; URL link Book

Note: Some publications make no reference to Location and/or have no ISBN. Unlike bibliographies in subject articles, "Cite book" templates are not used here because too many templates on one page often causes server overload, which often causes load/save problems.

== Bibliography ==
- Clements, William L. (1943). Thomas Jefferson, 1743–1943: A Guide to the Rare Books, Maps & Manuscripts Exhibited at the University of Michigan, William L. Clements Library, University of Michigan, 32 pages; Book
- Fitzgerald, Carol B. (1991). Thomas Jefferson: A Bibliography (Meckler's Bibliographies of the presidents of the U.S.) 400 pages; ISBN 978-0-88736-117-3; Book
- Johnston, Richard Holland (1905). A Contribution to a Bibliography of Thomas Jefferson, Library of Congress, 73 pages; e-Book
- Shuffleton, Frank (1983). Thomas Jefferson: A Comprehensive, Annotated Bibliography of Writings about Him, 1826–1980, 486 pages and Thomas Jefferson, 1981–1990: An Annotated Bibliography (New York: Garland Pub., 1992) 283 pages; ISBN 0-8240-9078-0

=== Biographical ===
- McDonald, ed. Robert M. S. Thomas Jefferson's Lives: Biographers and the Battle for History (2019) DOI: 10.2307/j.ctvn1tbj9 online
- Adams, James Truslow (1936). The Living Jefferson, C. Scribner's Sons, 403 pages; Book
- Appleby, Joyce (2003). Thomas Jefferson Thomas Jefferson: The American presidents Series: The 3rd President, 1801–1809, Macmillan, 184 pages; Book
- Bear, James Adam (1967). Jefferson at Monticello, University of Virginia Press, 144 pages; ISBN 978-0-8139-0022-3, Book
- ——; Nichols, Frederick Doveton; Thomas Jefferson Memorial Foundation, Inc. (1967). Monticello, Thomas Jefferson Memorial Foundation, 77 pages; Book
- Barrett, Marvin (1968). "Meet Thomas Jefferson", Random House, 80 pages. Illustrated by Angelo Torres.
- Bernstein, Richard. B. (2003). Thomas Jefferson, Oxford University Press, 288 pages; Book
- Bober, Natalie (2008). Thomas Jefferson: Draftsman of a Nation, University of Virginia Press, 360 pages; ISBN 978-0-8139-2732-9; Book
- Boles, John B. (2010). Seeing Jefferson Anew: In His Time and Ours, University of Virginia Press; 224 pages ISBN 978-0-8139-2997-2, Book
- —— (2017). Jefferson: Architect of American Liberty. Basic Books, 640 pages. ISBN 978-0-4650-9468-4.
- Bottorff, William K. (1979). Thomas Jefferson, Twayne Publishers, 162 pages; ISBN 978-0-8057-7260-9; Book
- Bowers, Claude Gernade; Franklin, Francis; Browder, Earl (1943). The Heritage of Jefferson. New York: Workers School.
- —— (1945). The Young Jefferson 1743–1789, Houghton Mifflin Company, 544 pages; e'Book
- Brodie, Fawn McKay (1974). Thomas Jefferson: An Intimate History, W.W. Norton, 594 pages; Book
- Brown, David Scott (1998). Thomas Jefferson: A Biographical Companion, Abc-Clio Incorporated, 266 pages; ISBN 978-0-87436-949-6; Book
- Brown, Stuart Gerry (1963) Thomas Jefferson, Washington Square Press, 247 pages; Book
- Browne, Stephen H. (2003). Jefferson's Call for Nationhood: The First Inaugural Address, Texas A&M University Press, 155 pages; ISBN 978-1-58544-252-2; Book
- Burke, Rick (2002). Thomas Jefferson, Capstone Classroom, 32 pages; Book
- Burstein, Andrew (1995).The Inner Jefferson: Portrait of a Grieving Optimist, University Press of Virginia, 334 pages; ISBN 978-0-8139-1720-7; Book
- —— (2005). Jefferson's Secrets: Death and Desire at Monticello, Basic Books, New York, 351 pages; ISBN 978-0-465-00813-1, Book
- ——; Isenberg, Nancy (2010). Madison and Jefferson, Random House LLC, 809 pages; ISBN 978-0-679-60410-5; Book
- Catlett, Lowell B. (2004). Thomas Jefferson: A Free Mind, Trafford Publishing, 164 pages; ISBN 978-1-4120-2209-5; Book
- Cogliano, Francis D. (2011). A Companion to Thomas Jefferson, John Wiley & Sons, 608 pages; ISBN 978-1-4443-4461-5; Book
- Craughwell, Thomas J. (2012). Thomas Jefferson's Crème Brûlée, Quirk Books, Philadelphia, 233 pages; ISBN 978-1-5947-4578-2; Book
- Crawford, Alan Pell (2008). Twilight at Monticello, Random House, New York, 322 pages; Book
- Cunningham, Noble E. (1988). In Pursuit of Reason, Random House Publishing Group, 414 pages; Book; well-reviewed short biography
- —— (2001). The Inaugural Addresses of President Thomas Jefferson, 1801 And 1805, University of Missouri Press, 122 pages; ISBN 978-0-8262-6406-0; Book
- Curtis, William Eleroy (1901). The True Thomas Jefferson, J.B. Lippincott, 395 pages; e'Book1, e'Book2
- Davis, Thomas Jefferson (1876). A Sketch of the Life, Character, and Public Services of Thomas Jefferson, Claxton, Remsen & Haffelfinger, 167 pages; e'Book1, e'Book2
- Dwight, Theodore (1839). The character of Thomas Jefferson, as exhibited in his own writings, Weeks, Jordan & Company, Boston, 371 pages; e'Book1, e'Book2
- Ellis, Edward Sylvester (1898). Thomas Jefferson: a character sketch, The University association, 112 pages; e'Book
- Ellis, Joseph (1998).American Sphinx: The Character of Thomas Jefferson, Knopf Doubleday Publishing Group, 464 pages Book
- Fleming, Thomas J. (1969). The Man from Monticello: An Intimate Life of Thomas Jefferson, William Morrow, Publisher, 409 pages; Book
- Gabler, James M. (1995). Passions: The Wines and Travels of Thomas Jefferson. Bacchus Press Ltd, Publisher. 318 pages;
- Gilpin, Henry Dilworth (1828). A biographical sketch of Thomas Jefferson, 372 pages; e'Book1, e'Book2
- Gordon-Reed, Annette (2008). The Hemingses of Monticello: An American Family, W. W. Norton & Company 798 pages; Book
- Halliday, E. M. (2009). Understanding Thomas Jefferson, Perennial HarperCollins, New York, 304 pages; ISBN 978-0-06-175546-0; Book
- Hayes, Kevin J. (2008). The Road to Monticello: The Life and Mind of Thomas Jefferson, Oxford University Press, 752 pages; ISBN 978-0-19-975848-7; Book
- Hazelton, Mary; Wade, Blanchard (1930). The Boy who Loved Freedom: The Story of Thomas Jefferson, D. Appleton, 234 pages; Book
- Hitchens, Christopher (2005). Thomas Jefferson: Author of America, HarperCollins, 208 pages; ISBN 978-0-06-175397-8; Book
- Hyland, William G. (2009). In Defense of Thomas Jefferson: The Sally Hemings Sex Scandal. Thomas Dunne Books, 320 pages. ISBN 978-0-312-56100-0., Book
- —— (2013). Long Journey with Mr. Jefferson: The Life of Dumas Malone. Potomac Books, Inc. ISBN 978-1-6123-4198-9.
- Jefferson Club Association (1902). The Pilgrimage to Monticello: The Home and Tomb of Thomas Jefferson, Con. P. Curran Printing Company. Monticello, Virginia; 78 pages; e'Book
- Johnston, Johanna (1961). Thomas Jefferson: his many talents, Dodd, Mead, Publishers, 160 pages; Book
- Jones, Veda Boyd (2000). Thomas Jefferson: Author of the Declaration of Independence, Facts On File, Incorporated, 80 pages; ISBN 978-0-7910-5353-9; Book
- Judson, Clara Ingram (1952). Thomas Jefferson, champion of the people, Wilcox and Follett Co., 224 pages; Book
- Kaplan, Lawrence S. (1999). Thomas Jefferson: Westward the Course of Empire, Rowman & Littlefield, 198 pages; ISBN 978-0-8420-2630-7; Book
- Kimball, Marie (2007). Jefferson – The Scene of Europe 1784 to 1789, Read Books, 388 pages; ISBN 978-1-4067-2338-0; Book
- —— (1943). Jefferson: The Road to Glory, 1743 to 1776, Coward-McCann, Incorporated, 358 pages; Book
- Koch, Adrienne (1971). Jefferson, Prentice-Hall, 180 pages; Book
- Kranish, Michael (2010). Flight from Monticello: Thomas Jefferson at War, Oxford University Press, 400 pages; ISBN 978-0-19-974590-6; Book
- Kuper, Theodore Fred (1968). Thomas Jefferson Still Lives, Arthur Price Foundation, 32 pages; Book
- Langhorne, Elizabeth Coles (1987). Monticello, a Family Story, Algonquin Books, 289 pages; ISBN 978-0-912697-58-1; Book
- Linn, William (1843). The Life of Thomas Jefferson: Author of the Declaration of Independence, and Third President of the United States, Andrus, Woodruff, & Gauntlett, 267 pages; e'Book
- Lisitzky, Gene (1933). Thomas Jefferson, The Viking Press, 356 pages; Book
- Lyman, T.P.H. (1826). The life of Thomas Jefferson: esq., LL. D., late ex president of the United , D & S Neall, Philadelphia, 111 pages; e'Book
- Malone, Dumas. Jefferson and His Time, 6 vols. (1948–82), Little Brown and Company, Boston; Six-volume biography of Thomas Jefferson by leading expert; the major scholarly study; Pulitzer Prize; A short version is online

- Jefferson the Virginian (1948), 413 pages; e'Book
- Jefferson and the Rights of Man (1951). e'Book (text), e'Books
- Jefferson and the Ordeal of Liberty (1962). 545 pages; Book, e'Books
- Jefferson the President: First Term, 1801–1805 (1970). Book
- Jefferson the President: Second Term, 1805–1809 (1974). 704 pages, Book
- Jefferson and his time: The Sage of Monticello (1981). 551 pages; Book

- —— (1963). Thomas Jefferson as Political Leader, University of California Press, 75 pages; Book
- —— (1961). Dictionary of American Biography, Vol V, Thomas Jefferson, Charles Scribner's Sons, New York e'Book
- Mapp, Alf (1987). Thomas Jefferson: A Strange Case of Mistaken Identity, Madison Books, 487 pages; ISBN 978-0-8191-5782-9 Book
- —— (2009). Thomas Jefferson: Passionate Pilgrim, Rowman & Littlefield, 445 pages; ISBN 978-0-7425-6440-4; Book
- Mayer, David (2008). "Jefferson, Thomas (1743–1826)". In Hamowy, Ronald (ed.). The Encyclopedia of Libertarianism. Thousand Oaks, CA: SAGE; Cato Institute. pp. 262–63. doi:10.4135/9781412965811.n158. ISBN 978-1-4129-6580-4. LCCN 2008009151. OCLC 750831024.
- Mayo, Bernard (1970). Jefferson Himself: The Personal Narrative of a Many-Sided American, University of Virginia Press, 384 pages; ISBN 978-0-8139-0310-1; Book
- Mclean, Dabney N. (1996). The English ancestry of Thomas Jefferson, Clearfield, ISBN 978-0-8063-4608-3; 84 pages; Book
- Mclaughlin, Jack (1990) Jefferson and Monticello: The Biography of a Builder, Macmillan, 496 pages; ISBN 978-0-8050-1463-1 Url
- McEwan, Barbara (1991). Thomas Jefferson, Farmer, McFarland, 219 pages; ISBN 978-0-89950-633-3; Book
- Meacham, Jon (2012). Thomas Jefferson: The Art of Power, Random House LLC, 764 pages, Book
- Meltzer, Milton (1991). Thomas Jefferson, the Revolutionary Aristocrat, F. Watts, 255 pages; ISBN 978-0-531-11069-0; Book
- —— (ed.) (1986). Thomas Jefferson: A Reference Biography: 24 essays by leading scholars on aspects of Jefferson's career.
- Merwin, Henry Childs (1901). Thomas Jefferson, Houghton, Mifflin, 164 pages; E'book
- Morse, John Torrey Jr. (1885). Thomas Jefferson, Houghton, Mifflin and Company, Boston, 344 pages; E'book1, E'book2
- Mullin, Rita Thievon (2007). Thomas Jefferson: Architect of Freedom, Sterling Publishing Company, 124 pages; ISBN 978-1-4027-3397-0; Book
- Muzzey, David Saville (1918). Thomas Jefferson, C. Scribner's Sons, New York, 319 pages; E'book1, E'book2
- Onuf, Peter (2007). The Mind of Thomas Jefferson, University of Virginia Press, 281 pages; ISBN 978-0-8139-2611-7; Book
- —— (2016). Most Blessed of the Patriarchs: Thomas Jefferson and the Empire of the Imagination, W. W. Norton & Company, ISBN 978-1-63149-078-1 Book
- Parton, James (1883). Life of Thomas Jefferson, Third President of the United States, Houghton, Mifflin and Company, 764 pages; E'book
- Passos, John Dos (1954). The Head and Heart of Thomas Jefferson, Doubleday, Incorporated, 442 pages; Book
- Patterson, Charles (2000). Thomas Jefferson, iUniverse, 108 pages; ISBN 978-0-595-09589-6; Book
- Pettengill, Samuel B. (2007). Jefferson – The Forgotten Man, Read Books, 316 pages; ISBN 978-1-4067-2345-8; Book
- Peterson, Merrill D. (1970). Thomas Jefferson and the New Nation, A standard scholarly biography; Oxford University Press, 1104 pages; Book.
- Phillips, Kevin (2012). 1775 – A Good Year for Revolution, Viking Press, 628 pages; ISBN 978-0-670-02512-1
- Pierson, Rev. Hamilton W. (1862). Jefferson at Monticello. The Private Life of Thomas Jefferson. (from entirely new Materials with numerous facsimiles), Charles Scribner, New York; (Original from the University of Michigan), 138 pages; e'Book1, e'Book2

- Randall, Henry Stephens (1858). The Life of Thomas Jefferson, Volume I, Derby & Jackson, New York, 645 pages; e'Book1, e'Book2
- —— (1858). The Life of Thomas Jefferson, Volume II, Derby & Jackson, New York, 694 pages; e'Book, e'Book2
- —— (1858). The Life of Thomas Jefferson, Volume III, Derby & Jackson, New York, 731 pages; e'Book1, e'Book2

External videos
- Booknotes interview with Willard Sterne Randall on Thomas Jefferson: A Life, December 26, 1993, C-SPAN

- Randall, Willard Sterne (1994). Thomas Jefferson: A Life, HarperCollins, 736 pages; ISBN 0-06-097617-9. Book; popular biography
- Rayner, B. L. (1832). Sketches of the life, writings, and opinions of Thomas Jefferson, A. Francis and W. Boardman, 556 pages; e'Book
- Reed, Annette Gordon; Onuf, Peter S. (2016). "Most Blessed of the Patriarchs": Thomas Jefferson and the Empire of the Imagination; Liveright Publishers, ISBN 978-0-87140-442-8 Book
- Reef, Catherine (1991). Monticello, Dillon Press, 71 pages; ISBN 978-0-87518-472-2; Book
- Rhodes, Thomas L.; Lord, Frank B. (1947). The story of Monticello, The Pridemark Press, 94 pages; Book
- Rosenberger, Francis Coleman (1953). Jefferson Reader: A Treasury of Writings about Thomas Jefferson, E. P. Dutton, 349 pages; Book, e'Book
- Russell, Phillips (1956). Jefferson, champion of the free mind, Dodd, Mead, 374 pages; Book
- Salgo, Sandor (2000). Thomas Jefferson: Musician and Violinist, A book detailing Thomas Jefferson's love of music, Thomas Jefferson Foundation, 75 pages; ISBN 978-1-882886-12-8; Book
- Santrey, Laurence (1985). Thomas Jefferson, Troll Associates, 30 pages; ISBN 978-0-8167-0176-6; Book
- Schachner, Nathan (1957). Thomas Jefferson: A Biography 2 volumes, T. Yoseloff, 1070 pages, Book
- Schachner, Nathan (1951). Thomas Jefferson: A Biography, Appleton-Century-Crofts, 1070 pages; Book
- Scharff, Virginia (2010). The Women Jefferson Loved, HarperCollins, 496 pages; ISBN 978-0-06-201873-1; Book
- Schmucker, Samuel Mosheim; Ketcham, Henry (1903). The Life of Thomas Jefferson, A. L. Burt company, New York, 345 pages; e'Book
- Schouler, James (1882). History of the United States of America Under the Constitution, Volume 2, William H. Morrison, New York, 472 pages; e'Book1, e'Book2
- —— (1893). Thomas Jefferson, Dodd, Mead, New York, 252 pages; e'Book1, e'Book2
- Sheean, Vicent (1953). Thomas Jefferson: father of democracy, New York : Random House, 184 pages; Book1, E'book2
- Shuffelton, Frank (2012). The Cambridge Companion to Thomas Jefferson, Cambridge University Press, 212 pages; ISBN 978-0-521-86731-3; Book
- Simpson, Lloyd D. (1885). Notes on Thomas Jefferson, Sherman & Co., Printers, 182 pages; e'Book1, e'Book2
- Simpson, Stephen (1833). The lives of George Washington and Thomas Jefferson, H. Young, 389 pages; e'Book
- Sistine, Johathan (2016). Thomas Jefferson: The Failures and Greatness of an Ordinary Man. CreateSpace Independent Publishing Platform. ISBN 978-1-5238-3448-8.
- Smith, Page (1976). Jefferson: a revealing biography, American Heritage Publishing Company / McGraw-Hill, 310 pages; Book
- Stein, Susan (1993). The worlds of Thomas Jefferson at Monticello, H.N. Abrams, in association with the Thomas Jefferson Memorial Foundation, Inc., 472 pages; Book
- Smucker, Samuel Mosheim (1857). The life and times of Thomas Jefferson, Evans, 400 pages; e'Book1, e'Book2
- Staloff, Darren (2007).Hamilton, Adams, Jefferson: The Politics of Enlightenment and the American Founding, Macmillan, 432 pages; Book
- Stone, Eugene E. (1922). The story of Thomas Jefferson, Barse & Hopkins, 174 pages; e'Book
- Thomas Jefferson Bicentennial Commission (1943). Thomas Jefferson, author of the declaration of American independence, Thomas Jefferson Bicentennial Commission, 35 pages; Book
- Trueit, Trudi Strain (2009). Thomas Jefferson, Marshall Cavendish, 112 pages; ISBN 978-0-7614-4667-5; Book
- Tucker, George (1837). The Life of Thomas Jefferson, Third President of the United States, in two volumes; Carey, Lea & Blanchard, Philadelphia, 537 and 545 pages respectively; e'Book, Vol.1, Vol.2
- —— (1838). Defense of the character of Thomas Jefferson, against a writer in the New-York review, New-York, W. Osborn, 48 pages; e'Book
- Watson, Thomas E. (1900). Thomas Jefferson, Small, Maynard & company, Boston, 153 pages; e'Book1,e'Book2
- —— (1903). The life and times of Thomas Jefferson, D. Appleton and company, New York, 534 pages; e'Book1, e'Book2
- Webster, Nathan Burnham (1890). Thomas Jefferson, J. B. Lippincott Company, 7 pages; e'Book
- Wibberley, Leonard (1963). Man of Liberty: A Life of Thomas Jefferson, Farrar, Straus and Giroux, 404 pages; ISBN 978-0-374-34752-9; e'Book1, e'Book2
- Wiencek, Henry (2012). Master of the Mountain, Macmillan, 336 pages; ISBN 978-0-374-29956-9; Book
- Wilbur, Marguerite Eyer (1962). Thomas Jefferson, apostle of liberty, Liveright Pub. Corp., 417 pages; Book
- Wilstach, Paul (1925). Jefferson and Monticello, Doubleday, New York, 258 pages; e'Book

=== Declaration of Independence ===
- Allen, Danielle (2014). Our Declaration, Liveright Publishing Corporation, New York / London, 317 pages; ISBN 978-0-87140-690-3
- Armitage, David (2007). The Declaration of Independence: A Global History, Harvard University Press, 300 pages; ISBN 978-0-674-02282-9; Book
- Becker, Carl (1970). The Declaration of Independence: A Study in the History of Political Ideas, Vintage Books, ISBN 978-0-394-70060-1; e'Book
- Bergen, Frank (1898). The Other Side of the Declaration of Independence: A Lecture, Elizabeth Journal Print, 45 pages; e'Book
- Boyd, Julian P.; Gawalt, Gerard W. (1999). The Declaration of Independence: The Evolution of the Text, University Press of New England, ISBN 978-0-8444-0980-1, Book
- Buchanan, Roberdeau (1890). Observations on the Declaration of Independence : with a critical examination of the facts attending its attestation, Inquirer Printing Company, Lancaster, Pa. 20 pages; e'Book
- Casey, Robert E. (1927). The Declaration of independence: illustrated story of its adoption, with the biographies ..., Illustrated Publishers, 192 pages; e'Book
- Corn, Ira G. (1977). The story of the Declaration of Independence, Corwin Books, 228 pages; ISBN 978-0-89474-010-7; Book
- Dershowitz, Alan (2003). America Declares Independence, Wiley, 196 pages; ISBN 978-0-471-26482-8; Book
- Donaldson, Thomas (1898). The house in which Thomas Jefferson wrote the Declaration of Independence. Avil Printing Co., Philadelphia, 119 pages; e'Book
- Fliegelman, Jay (1993). Declaring Independence: Jefferson, Natural Language & the Culture of Performance, Stanford University Press, 268 pages; ISBN 978-0-8047-2076-2; Book
- Friedenwald, Herbert (1904). The Declaration of Independence: An Interpretation and an Analysis, Macmillan, 299 pages; e'Book
- Hawke, David Freeman (1976). Honorable treason: the Declaration of Independence and the men who signed it, Viking Press, 240 pages; Book
- Hazelton, John Hampden (1906). The Declaration of Independence: Its History, Dodd, Mead, New York; 627 pages; e'Book
- Jayne, Allen (2000). Jefferson's Declaration of Independence: Origins, Philosophy and Theology; traces TJ's sources and emphasizes his incorporation of Deist theology into the Declaration.
- Kaminski, John P. (1995). A Necessary Evil?: Slavery and the Debate Over the Constitution, Rowman & Littlefield, 289 pages; ISBN 978-0-945612-16-2; Book
- Lossing, Benson John (2012). Lives of the Signers of the Declaration of Independence, Tales End Press; ISBN 978-1-62358-017-9; Book
- Maier, Pauline (2013). American Scripture: Making the Declaration of Independence, Random House LLC, 336 pages; ISBN 978-0-307-79195-5; Book
- Malone, Dumas (1954). The Story of the Declaration of Independence, Oxford University Press, 282 pages; Book
- Michael, William Henry (1904). The Declaration of Independence, U.S. Government Printing Office, 99 pages; E'book1, e'Book2
- Perrault, John (2009). Jefferson's dream: the ballad of the Declaration of IndependenceHobblebush Books, 80 pages; ISBN 978-0-9801672-7-6; Book
- Thacher, John Boyd (1907). The Declaration of Independence, The North American Review, e'Book
- Wills, Garry (2002). Inventing America: Jefferson's Declaration of Independence, Houghton Mifflin Harcourt, 398 pages; ISBN 978-0-618-25776-8; Book

=== Newspapers and the press ===
- Durey, Michael. With the Hammer of Truth James Thomson Callender and America’s Early National Heroes (U Press of Virginia, 1990). online
- Humphrey, Carol Sue The Press of the Young Republic, 1783–1833 (1996)
- Knudson, Jerry W. Jefferson and the Press: Crucible of Liberty (2006) how 4 Republican and 4 Federalist papers covered election of 1800; Thomas Paine; Louisiana Purchase; Hamilton–Burr duel; impeachment of Chase; and the embargo
- Marcus, Daniel. Scandal and Civility: Journalism and the Birth of American Democracy (2009)
- Mott, Frank Luther. Jefferson and the press (LSU Press, 1943) online
- Pasley, Jeffrey L. "The Tyranny of Printers": Newspaper Politics in the Early American Republic (2003) (ISBN 0-8139-2177-5)
- Stewart, Donald H. The Opposition Press of the Federalist Era (1968), highly detailed study of Republican newspapers

=== Politics and ideas ===
- Ackerman, Bruce (2009). The Failure of the Founding Fathers: Jefferson, Marshall, and the Rise of Presidential Democracy, Harvard University Press, 400 pages; Book
- Adair, Douglass; Yellin, Mark E. (Ed.) (2000). The Intellectual Origins of Jeffersonian Democracy: Republicanism, the Class Struggle, and the Virtuous Farmer, Lexington Books, 185 pages; ISBN 978-0-7391-0125-4; Book
- Adams, Henry (1889). History of the United States of America during the Administrations of Thomas Jefferson (1889–1891, Charles Scribner's Sons; Library of America edition 1986) famous 9-volume history; e'Book

- —— (1891). History of the United States of America during the administration of Thomas Jefferson, vol.i, Charles Scribner's Sons, New York, 456 pages, E'book1, E'book2
- —— (1889). History of the United States of America during the administration of Thomas Jefferson, vol.ii, Charles Scribner's Sons, New York, 456 pages, E'book
- —— (1889). History of the United States of America during the second administration of Thomas Jefferson, vol.iii, Charles Scribner's Sons, New York, 471 pages, E'book
- —— (1890). History of the United States of America during the second administration of Thomas Jefferson, vol.iv, Charles Scribner's Sons, New York, 502 pages, E'book
- —— (1947). The formative years: a history of the United States during the administrations of Jefferson and Madison, Houghton Mifflin Company, 1067 pages; Book, E'book

- Adams, Herbert Baxter (1888). Thomas Jefferson and the University of Virginia, U.S. Government Printing Office, 308 pages; e'Book
- Adams, William Howard (2000). The Paris Years of Thomas Jefferson, Yale University Press, 368 pages; ISBN 978-0-300-08261-6; Book
- Allen, Steven W. (2003). Founding Fathers: Uncommon Heroes, Legal Awareness Series, Incorporated, 314 pages; ISBN 978-1-879033-76-4; Book
- Alvord, Clarence Walworth; Washburne, Elihu Benjamin (1920). Governor Edward Coles, Volume 15, Trustees of the Illinois State Historical Library, 435 pages; e'Book1, e'Book2
- Ambrose, Stephen E. (1996). Undaunted Courage: Meriwether Lewis, Thomas Jefferson, and the Opening of the American West, Simon and Schuster, New York, 511 pages; ISBN 978-0-684-81107-9; Book
- Anderson, Frank Maloy (1900). Contemporary opinion of the Virginia and Kentucky resolutions, American Historical Review, e'Book1, e'Book2
- Arrowood, Charles Flinn (1930). Thomas Jefferson And Education in a Republic, McGraw Hill Book Company Inc, 184 pages; e'Book
- Bailey, Jeremy D. (2007). Thomas Jefferson and Executive Power, Cambridge University Press, 280 pages; ISBN 0-521-86831-9; Book
- Bailey, John (2013). Jefferson's Second Father, Pan, 328 pages; ISBN 978-1-74334-214-5; Book
- Bailyn, Bernard (1992). The Ideological Origins of the American Revolution, Harvard University Press, 396 pages; ISBN 978-0-674-44302-0; Book
- Banning, Lance (1980). The Jeffersonian Persuasion: Evolution of a Party Ideology, Cornell University Press, 307 pages; ISBN 978-0-8014-9200-6; Book
- —— (1995). Jefferson and Madison: Three Conversations from the Founding, Rowman & Littlefield, 256 pages; ISBN 978-0-945612-48-3; Book
- Beard, Charles Austin (1915). Economic Origins of Jeffersonian Democracy, Macmillan, New York, Boston, 474 pages; e'Book
- Bedini, Silvio A. (1990). Thomas Jefferson: statesman of science, Macmillan, 616 pages; ISBN 978-0-02-897041-7; Book
- Beloff, Baron Max Beloff (1948). Thomas Jefferson and American democracy, Hodder & Stoughton, 271 pages; Book
- Benson, C. Randolph (1971). Thomas Jefferson as social scientist, Fairleigh Dickinson University Press, 333 pages; 9780838677056; Book
- Berman, Eleanor Davidson (1947). Thomas Jefferson among the arts: an essay in early American esthetics, Philosophical Library, 305 pages; Book
- Bernstein, Richard B. (2004). The Revolution of Ideas, Oxford University Press, 251 pages; ISBN 978-0-19-514368-3, Book
- Blunt, Ray (2012). Crossed Lives-Crossed Purposes: Why Thomas Jefferson Failed and William Willberforce Persisted in Leading an End to Slavery, Wipf and Stock Publishers, 292 pages; ISBN 978-1-6109-7571-1; Book
- Boles, John B.; Hall, Randal L. (2010). Seeing Jefferson Anew: In His Time and Ours, University of Virginia Press, 224 pages; ISBN 978-0-8139-2997-2; Book
- Boorstin, Daniel J. (1993). The Lost World of Thomas Jefferson, University of Chicago Press, 320 pages; ISBN 978-0-226-06497-0; Book
- Boutell, Lewis Henry (1891). Thomas Jefferson, the Man of Letters, Private printing: Press of S. Thompson & Company, 73 pages; E'book1, E'book2
- Bowen, Catherine Drinker (1986). Miracle at Philadelphia: The Story of the Constitutional Convention May to September 1787, Turtleback Books, 346 pages; ISBN 978-0-613-03429-6; Book
- Bowers, Claude G. (1936). Jefferson in Power The Death Struggle of the Federalist, Houghton Mifflin Company, 538 pages; E'book
- —— Jefferson And Hamilton The Struggle For Democracy in America, Kessinger Publishing, 560 pages; ISBN 978-0-7661-8598-2; Book
- Brown, Stuart Gerry (1954). The First Republicans: Political Philosophy and Public Policy in the Party of Jefferson and Madison, Book
- Browne, Charles Albert (1944). Thomas Jefferson and the Scientific Trends of His Time, Chronica botanica Company, 423 pages; Book
- Burton, Cynthia H. (2005). Jefferson vindicated: fallacies, omissions, and contradictions in the Hemings genealogical search, Cynthia H. Burton, 194 pages; ISBN 978-0-9767775-0-2; Book
- Butler, Benjamin Franklin (1840). Jeffersonian democracy: defined and vindicated, New York Standard, 8 pages; Book
- Cerami, Charles (2004). Jefferson's Great Gamble: The Remarkable Story of Jefferson, Napoleon and the Men Behind the Louisiana Purchase, Sourcebooks, Inc., 320 pages; ISBN 978-1-4022-3435-4; Book
- —— (2005). Young Patriots: The Remarkable Story of Two Men, Their Impossible Plan, and the Revolution that Created the Constitution, Sourcebooks, Inc., 354 pages; ISBN 978-1-4022-2472-0; Book
- —— (2002). Benjamin Banneker: Surveyor, Astronomer, Publisher, Patriot, John Wiley & Sons, 257 pages; ISBN 978-0-471-38752-7; Book
- —— (2008). Dinner at Mr. Jefferson's, John Wiley & Sons. ISBN 978-0-470-08306-2, 270 pages
- Channing, Edward (1906). The Jeffersonian System: 1801–1811, Harper & Brothers, New York, 299 pages; e'Book1, e'Book2
- Chinard, Gilbert (2011). Thomas Jefferson: The Apostle of Americanism, Little, Brown And Company, 595 pages; e'Book, 2nd printing, 1957, 3rd printing, 2011
- Clark, Allen Culling (1905). William Duane, Press of W.F. Roberts Company, 70 pages; e'Book
- Clemons, Harry (1954). The University of Virginia Library, 1825–1950: Story of a Jeffersonian Foundation, University of Virginia Library, 229 pages; Book
- Coles, Edward (1856). History of the Ordinance of 1787, Historical Society of Pennsylvania, 33 pages; e'Book
- Curtis, Christopher Michael (2012). Jefferson's Freeholders and the Politics of Ownership in the Old Dominion, Cambridge University Press, 255 pages; ISBN 978-1-107-01740-5; Book
- Cunningham, Noble E. (1957). The Jeffersonian Republicans: the formation of party organization, 1789–1801, Volume 2, University of North Carolina Press, 279 pages; Book
- —— (1963). The Jeffersonian Republicans in power: party operations, 1801–1809; University of North Carolina Press Book
- —— (1988). In Pursuit of Reason: The Life of Thomas Jefferson, Random House Publishing Group, ISBN 978-0-3072-9142-4, Book
- —— (2000). Jefferson Vs. Hamilton: Confrontations that Shaped a Nation, (Biography & Autobiography), Macmillan, 186 pages; Book
- Dabney, Virginius (1981). Mr. Jefferson's University: a history, University Press of Virginia, 642 pages; ISBN 978-0-8139-0904-2; Book
- —— (1981). The Jefferson scandals: a rebuttal, Dodd, Mead, 154 pages; ISBN 978-0-396-07964-4; Book
- Daugherty, Sonia Medvedeva (1941). Thomas Jefferson: fighter for freedom and human rights, F. Ungar Pub. Co., 352 pages; Book
- Davis, David Brion (1970). Was Thomas Jefferson an Authentic Enemy of Slavery?, Oxford, Clarendon Press, 29 pages; Book
- Dethloff, Henry C. (1971). Thomas Jefferson and American democracy, D. C. Heath, 209 pages; ISBN 978-0-669-73544-4; Book
- de Witt, Cornélis Henri; Church, R. S. H. (Ed.) (1862). Jefferson and the American Democracy: An Historical Study, Longman, Green, Longman, Roberts, & Green, 448 pages; e'Book
- Dumbauld, Edward (1979). The Bill of rights and what it means today, Greenwood Press, 242 pages; ISBN 978-0-313-21215-4; Book
- Dungan, Nicholas (2000). Gallatin: America's Swiss Founding Father, New York University Press, 193 pages; ISBN 978-0-8147-2111-7; Book
- Dunlap, John Robertson (1903). Jeffersonian Democracy: Which Means the Democracy of Thomas Jefferson, Andrew Jackson and Abraham Lincoln, Jeffersonian Society, 479 pages; e'Book
- Dunn, Susan (2004). Jefferson's Second Revolution: The Election Crisis of 1800 and the Triumph of Republicanism. Houghton Mifflin Harcourt, 384 pages. ISBN 978-0-5473-4575-8.
- Ellis, Richard E. (1971). The Jeffersonian Crisis: Courts and Politics in the Young Republic, Oxford University Press, 392 pages; ISBN 978-0-19-501390-0; Book
- Elkins, Stanley; McKitrick, Eric (1995). The Age of Federalism: The Early American Republic, 1788–1800, Oxford University Press, 944 pages; ISBN 978-0-19-509381-0; Book
- Fatovic, Clement; Kleinerman, Benjamin A. (2004). "Constitutionalism and Presidential Prerogative: Jeffersonian and Hamiltonian Perspectives." : American Journal of Political Science, Book
- Fenster, Julie M. (2016). Jefferson's America: The President, the Purchase, and the Explorers Who Transformed a Nation. Crown/Archetype. ISBN 978-0-3079-5654-5.
- Ferling, John (2000). Setting the World Ablaze : Washington, Adams, Jefferson, and the American Revolution:, Oxford University Press, 428 pages; ISBN 978-0-19-972881-7; Book
- —— (2005). Adams vs. Jefferson: The Tumultuous Election of 1800, Oxford University Press, 260 pages; ISBN 978-0-19-518906-3; Book
- —— (2013). Jefferson and Hamilton: The Rivalry That Forged a Nation, Bloomsbury Publishing USA, 352 pages; ISBN 978-1-60819-542-8; Book
- Finkelman, Paul (2001). Slavery and the Founders: Race and Liberty in the Age of Jefferson, M.E. Sharpe, 296 pages; ISBN 978-0-7656-2838-1; Book
- Fleming, Thomas J. (2003). The Louisiana Purchase, Wiley Publishers, 186 pages; ISBN 978-0-471-26738-6; Book
- —— (2015). The Great Divide: The Conflict between Washington and Jefferson that Defined a Nation, Da Capo Press, ISBN 978-0-3068-2127-1; Book
- Foster, Franklin Pierce (1917). The world war, Jefferson and democracy, The History Club, 51 pages; e'Book
- Foote, Henry Wilder (1947). Thomas Jefferson: Social Reformer, Volume 807, Issue 12, Beacon Press, 15 pages; Book
- Fremont-Barnes, Gregory (2006). The Wars of the Barbary Pirates: To the Shores of Tripoli – The Rise of the US Navy and Marines, Osprey Publishing, 95 pages; ISBN 978-1-84603-030-7; Book
- Frisch, Morton J. (1992). The Hamilton-Madison-Jefferson Triangle, Ashbrook Press, 39 pages; ISBN 978-1-878802-05-7; Book
- Gabler, James M. (1995). Passions: The Wines and Travels of Thomas Jefferson, Bacchus Press Ltd., 318 pages; ISBN 978-0-9613525-3-0; Book
- Gannon, Kevin M. (2001). Escaping "Mr. Jefferson's Plan of Destruction": New England Federalists and the Idea of a Northern Confederacy, 1803–1804, University of Pennsylvania Press Book
- Gawalt, Gerard W. (2010). Circle of Friends: Thomas Jefferson and His Women Correspondents, CreateSpace Independent Publishing Platform, 279 pages; ISBN 978-1-4563-5538-8; Book
- Geer, Curtis Manning; Lee, Guy Carleton; Thorpe, Francis Newton (1904). The Louisiana purchase and the westward movement, G. Barrie, publisher, 497 pages; e'Book
- Genovese, Eugene; Fox-Genovese, D. Elizabeth (2005). The Mind of the Master Class: History and Faith in the Southern Slaveholders' Worldview, Cambridge University Press, 828 pages; ISBN 978-0-521-85065-0; Book
- Giles, William Branch; Anderson, Dice Robins (1914). William Branch Giles: A Study in the Politics of Virginia and the Nation from 1790 to 1830, George Banta Publishing Company, 271 pages; e'Book
- Gilreath, James (1999). Thomas Jefferson and the Education of a Citizen, Library of Congress, 383 pages; ISBN 978-0-8444-0965-8; Book
- Gilpatrick, Delbert Harold (1931). Jeffersonian Democracy in North Carolina: 1789–1816, Columbia University Press, 257 pages; Book
- Golden, James L.; Golden, Alan L. (2002). Thomas Jefferson and the Rhetoric of Virtue, Rowman & Littlefield, 522 pages; ISBN 978-0-7425-2080-6; Book
- Gutzman, Kevin R.C. (2007). Virginia's American Revolution: From Dominion to Republic, 1776–1840, Lexington Books, 235 pages; ISBN 978-0-7391-2132-0; Book
- Hailman, John R. (2006). Thomas Jefferson on Wine, Univ. Press of Mississippi, 457 pages; ISBN 978-1-60473-138-5; Book
- Holowchak, M. Andrew (2013). Thomas Jefferson and Philosophy: Essays on the Philosophical Cast of Jefferson's Writings, Lexington Books, 220 pages; ISBN 978-0-7391-8092-1; Book
- Hammond, John Craig (2007). Slavery, Freedom, and Expansion in the Early American West, University of Virginia Press, 245 pages; ISBN 978-0-8139-2669-8; Book
- Hanson, Stephen D. (2010). Transcending Time with Thomas Jefferson: Is the Constitution Still Applicable Today?, iUniverse, 268 pages; ISBN 978-1-4502-4023-9; Book
- Harris, Matthew L.; Buckley, Jay H. (2012). Zebulon Pike, Thomas Jefferson, and the Opening of the American West, University of Oklahoma Press, 256 pages; ISBN 978-0-8061-8831-7; Book
- Hart, Albert Bushnell (1893). Formation of the Union, 1750–1829, Longmans, Green, 278 pages; e'Book1, e'Book2
- —— (1906) & numerous authors The American Nation: The Jeffersonian system, 1801–1811, by E. Channing, Harper & Brothers, New York, London, 299 pages; e'Book
- Hatch, Peter J. (1992). The Gardens of Thomas Jefferson's Monticello, Thomas Jefferson Memorial Foundation, 56 pages; ISBN 978-1-882886-07-4; Book
- Hatzenbuehler, Ronald L. (2007). "I Tremble for My Country": Thomas Jefferson and the Virginia Gentry, University Press of Florida; 206 pages; ISBN 0-8130-3383-7
- Hellenbrand, Harold (1980). The Unfinished Revolution: Education and Politics in the Thought of Thomas Jefferson, Associated University Press, 207 pages; ISBN 978-0-87413-370-7; Book
- Helo, Ari (2014). Thomas Jefferson's Ethics and the Politics of Human Progress: The Morality of a Slaveholder, Cambridge University Press, 296 pages; ISBN 978-1-107-04078-6; Book
- Hildreth, Richard (1856). John Adams and Jefferson, Harper & Brothers, New York, 579 pages; e'Book
- Historical Society of Pennsylvania (1901). Inauguration of President Thomas Jefferson, The Pennsylvania Magazine of History and Biography (pp. 71–76), e'Book1, e'Book2
- Hitchens, Christopher (2005). Author of America: Thomas Jefferson, HarperCollins, 208 pages; Book
- —— (2007). Jefferson Versus the Muslim Pirates, CITY Journal, The Manhattan Institute, Magazine, Essay
- Honeywell, Roy J. (1931). The Educational Work of Thomas Jefferson, Harvard University Press, 295 pages; e'Book
- Horn, James P.P.; Jan Ellen Lewis and Peter S. Onuf, eds. (2002). The Revolution of 1800: Democracy, Race, and the New Republic 17 essays by scholars
- Hotchner, A.E. (1996). Louisiana Purchase, Carroll & Graf Publishers, 383 pages; ISBN 978-0-7867-0309-8; Book
- Houston, Frank K. (2010). Historic Monticello: Home of Thomas Jefferson, Charlottesville, Virginia, Albertype – Monticello (Va.); 50 pages; Book
- Howard, Hugh (2011). Dr. Kimball and Mr. Jefferson: Rediscovering the Founding Fathers of American Architecture, Bloomsbury Publishing USA, 320 pages; ISBN 978-1-60819-660-9; Book
- Hubbard, Elbert; Lentz, John Jacob (1906). Thomas Jefferson: A Little Journey, Roycrofters, 105 pages; e'Book
- Jackson, Donald Dean (1989). A Year at Monticello, 1795, Fulcrum, 117 pages; Book
- —— (1993). Thomas Jefferson & the Stony Mountains: Exploring the West from Monticello, University of Oklahoma Press, 339 pages; ISBN 978-0-8061-2504-6; Book
- Johnstone, Robert Jr. (1978). Jefferson and the Presidency: Leadership in the Young Republic, Ithaca: Cornell University Press, 332 pages; ISBN 978-0-8014-1150-2; Book
- Kaminski, John P. (2005). Thomas Jefferson: Philosopher and Politician, UW-Madison Libraries Parallel Press, 95 pages; ISBN 978-1-893311-59-6; Book
- Kaplan, Lawrence S. (1980). Jefferson and France: an essay on politics and political ideas, Greenwood Press, 175 pages; Book
- Kennedy, Roger G. (2003). Mr. Jefferson's Lost Cause: Land, Farmers, Slavery, and the Louisiana Purchase, Oxford University Press, 376 pages; Book
- Kilmeade, Brian; Yaeger, Don (2015). Thomas Jefferson and the Tripoli Pirates: The Forgotten War That Changed American History, Penguin Press, ISBN 978-0-6981-9741-1 Book
- Kimball, Fiske (1968). Thomas Jefferson: Architect, Library Reprints, Incorporated, 205 pages; ISBN 978-0-7222-4666-5; Book
- —— (1949). Jefferson and the Public Buildings of Virginia, Williamsburg (Va.), 6 pages; Book
- Kimball, Marie (2007). Jefferson – War and Peace 1776 to 1784, Read Books, 424 pages; ISBN 978-1-4067-2361-8; Book
- Kitzen, Michael L.S. (1993). Tripoli and the United States at war: a history of American relations with the Barbary states, 1785–1805, McFarland, 203 pages; ISBN 978-0-89950-823-8; Book
- Koch, Adrienne (2008). Jefferson and Madison – The Great Collaboration, Read Books, 328 pages; ISBN 978-1-4437-2364-0; Book
- —— (1957). The Philosophy of Thomas Jefferson, Peter Smith, publisher, 208 pages; Book
- Knudson, Jerry W. (2006). Jefferson and the Press: Crucible of Liberty, University of South Carolina Press, 221 pages; ISBN 978-1-57003-607-1; Book
- Lacey, Michael James; Haakonssen, Knud (1992). A Culture of Rights: The Bill of Rights in Philosophy, Politics and Law 1791 and 1991, Cambridge University Press, 474 pages; ISBN 978-0-521-44653-2; Book
- Lambeth, William; Manning, Warren (2009). Thomas Jefferson as an Architect and a Designer of Landscapes, Applewood Books, 188 pages; ISBN 978-1-4290-1401-4; Book
- Ledgin, Norm (2000). Diagnosing Jefferson, Future Horizons, 254 pages; ISBN 978-1-885477-60-6; Book
- Lehmann, Karl; Malone, Dumas (1985). Thomas Jefferson, American Humanist, University of Virginia Press, 273 pages; ISBN 978-0-8139-1078-9; Book
- Leiner, Frederick C. (2000). Millions for defense: the subscription warships of 1798, Naval Institute Press, 262 pages; Book
- Lerner, Max (2013). Thomas Jefferson: America's Philosopher-King, Transaction Publishers, 147 pages; ISBN 978-1-4128-5276-0; Book
- Levinson, Sanford; Sparrow, Bartholomew (2005). The Louisiana Purchase and American Expansion, 1803–1898, Rowman & Littlefield Publishers, 272 pages; ISBN 978-1-4616-4468-2; Book
- Levy, Leonard Williams (1963). Jefferson & civil liberties: the darker side, Belknap Press of Harvard University Press, 225 pages; Book
- Levy, Robert (2007). The First Emancipator: Slavery, Religion, and the Quiet Revolution of Robert Cater, Random House, 360 pages; ISBN 978-0-3757-6104-1; Book
- Lewis, Jan; Onuf, Peter S. (1999). Sally Hemings & Thomas Jefferson: History, Memory, and Civic Culture, University of Virginia Press, 280 pages; ISBN 978-0-8139-1919-5; Book
- Long, Orie William (1933). Thomas Jefferson and George Ticknor: A Chapter in American Scholarship, McClelland Press, 39 pages; Book
- Malone, Dumas (1963). Thomas Jefferson as Political Leader, University of California Press, 75 pages; Book
- Massner, Franziska (2008). Thomas Jefferson and Slavery, GRIN Verlag, 28 pages; ISBN 978-3-638-89655-9; Book
- Matthews, Richard K. (1984). The Radical Political Philosophy of Thomas Jefferson, University Press of Kansas, 171 pages; ISBN 978-0-7006-0256-8; Book
- Mayer, David N. (1988). The Constitutional Thought of Thomas Jefferson (Constitutionalism and Democracy)
  University of Virginia Press, 1448 pages; ISBN 978-0-8139-1485-5; Book
- McColley, Robert (1964). Slavery and Jeffersonian Virginia, University of Illinois Press, 227 pages; Book
- McCoy, Drew R. (1996). The Elusive Republic: Political Economy in Jeffersonian America, University of North Carolina Press, 268 pages; ISBN 978-0-8078-4616-2; Book
- McDonald, Forrest (1987). The Presidency of Thomas Jefferson intellectual history approach to Jefferson's presidency, University Press of Kansas, 216 pages; ISBN 978-0-7006-0330-5; Book
- McDonald, Robert M. S. (2004). Thomas Jefferson's Military Academy: Founding West Point. Jeffersonian America University of Virginia Press, 233 pages; ISBN 978-0-8139-2298-0; Book
- —— (2012). Light and Liberty: Thomas Jefferson and the Power of Knowledge, University of Virginia Press, 232 pages; ISBN 978-0-8139-3236-1; Book
- McDowell, Gary L.; Noble, Sharon L. (1997). Reason and Republicanism: Thomas Jefferson's Legacy of Liberty, Rowman & Littlefield, 325 pages; ISBN 978-0-8476-8521-9; Book
- McLean, Iain (2004). "Thomas Jefferson, John Adams, and the Déclaration des Droits de l'Homme et du Citoyen" in McLean, The future of liberal democracy: Thomas Jefferson and the contemporary world, Palgrave Macmillan, online, Book
- McMurry, Rebecca L.; McMurry, James F. (2002). Anatomy of a scandal: Thomas Jefferson & the Sally story, White Mane Books, 204 pages; ISBN 978-1-57249-303-2; Book
- Merwin, Henry Childs (1899). Aaron Burr, Small, Maynard, Boston, 150 pages; e'Book1, e'Book2
- Miller, John Chester (1963). The Federalist Era: 1789–1801, Harper & Row, 304 pages; ISBN 978-0-06-133027-8; Book
- —— (1980). The Wolf by the Ears: Thomas Jefferson and Slavery New American Library, 123 pages; |ISBN 0-452-00530-2; Book
- Miller, Robert (2006). Native America, Discovered and Conquered: : Thomas Jefferson, Lewis & Clark, and Manifest Destiny, Greenwood Publishing Group, ISBN 978-0-275-99011-4; Book
- Mooy, Kees de (2003). The Wisdom of Thomas Jefferson, Citadel Publishers, 224 pages; ISBN 978-0-8065-2421-4; Book
- Mott, Frank Luther (1943). Jefferson and the Press, Louisiana State University Press, 65 pages; Book
- Murrin, John M. (2000). The Jeffersonian Triumph and American Exceptionalism, University of Pennsylvania Press, Academic Journal
- Nash, Gary; Russell, Graham; Hodges, Gao (2012). Friends of Liberty: Thomas Jefferson, Tadeusz Kosciuszko, and Agrippa Hull, Basic Books, 328 pages; ISBN 978-0-465-03148-1; Book
- Nester, William (2013). The Jeffersonian vision, 1801–1815: The Art of American Power During the Early Republic, Potomac Books, Inc, 294 pages Book
- Newbold, Stephanie P. (2010). All But Forgotten: Thomas Jefferson and the Development of Public Administration, SUNY Press, 147 pages; ISBN 978-1-4384-3074-4; Book
- Nicolay, John George; Stockton, Frank Richard (1887). Thomas Jefferson's Home, Century Company, 658 pages; e'Book
- Norton, Wilbur Theodore (1911). Edward Coles: Second Governor of Illinois. 1786–1868, Washington Square Press, 30 pages; e'Book
- O'Brien, Conor Cruise (1996). The Long Affair: Thomas Jefferson and the French Revolution, 1785–1800, University of Chicago Press, 367 pages; ISBN 978-0-226-61653-7; Book
- Onuf, Peter S. (1993). Jeffersonian Legacies, University of Virginia Press, 478 pages; ISBN 978-0-8139-1463-3; Book
- —— (1999). Thomas Jefferson: An Anthology, Wiley, 272 pages; ISBN 978-1-881089-57-5; Book
- —— (2000). "Every Generation Is An Nation': Colonization, Miscegenation and the Fate of Jefferson's Children", William and Mary Quarterly, Vol. LVII, No.1, January 2000, JSTOR;
- —— (2001). Jefferson's Empire: The Languages of American Nationhood, University of Virginia Press, 250 pages; ISBN 978-0-8139-2204-1; Book
- Padover, Saul K. (1965). Thomas Jefferson and the Foundations of American Freedom, Fawcett Publications, 192 pages; Book
- —— (1946). Thomas Jefferson and The National Capital, U.S. Government Printing Office, 522 pages; e'Book
- Pancake, John S. (1974). Thomas Jefferson & Alexander Hamilton, Barron's Educational Series, 521 pages; Book
- Perry, Barbara A. (2006). "Jefferson's Legacy to the Supreme Court: Freedom of Religion", Journal of Supreme Court History: pp. 181–98. ISSN 1059-4329 Fulltext in Swetswise, Ingenta and Ebsco
- Peterson, Merrill D. (1963). Jefferson's 'Consent of the Governed': Convolutions of a Doctrine, Thomas Jefferson Memorial Foundation, 17 pages; Book
- —— (1975). Thomas Jefferson and the Enlightenment: reflections on literary influence, Westminster Publications, 39 pages; Book
- —— (1984). Thomas Jefferson, the Founders, and Constitutional Change, Claremont Institute for the Study of Statesmanship and Political Philosophy, 20 pages; ISBN 978-0-930783-06-8; Book
- Philips, Kim Tousley (1989). William Duane, radical journalist in the age of Jefferson, Garland Pubublishers, 679 pages, ISBN 978-0-8240-6193-7; Book
- Poffenberger, Brien J. (1991). Jefferson's Design of the Capitol of Virginia, University of Virginia, 230 pages; Book
- Presidential Library (2010). The Wisdom of Thomas Jefferson, Open Road Media, 251 pages; ISBN 978-1-4532-0266-1; Book
- Ragosta, John (2013). Religious Freedom: Jefferson's Legacy, America's Creed, University of Virginia Press, 312 pages; ISBN 978-0-8139-3371-9; Book
- Rahe, Paul A. (1995). "Thomas Jefferson's Machiavellian Political Science". Review of Politics 57(3): 449–481. ISSN 0034-6705 Fulltext online at Jstor and Ebsco.
- Rakove, Jack (2010). Revolutionaries: A New History of the Invention of America, Houghton Mifflin Harcourt, 496 pages; ISBN 978-0-547-48674-1; Book
- Rayner, B.L. (1832). Sketches of the life, writings, and opinions of Thomas Jefferson, A. Francis and W. Boardman, 556 pages; E'book
- —— (1834). Life of Thomas Jefferson, Lilly, Wait, Colman, & Holden, Boston, 431 pages; E'book1, E'book2
- Read, James H. (2000). Power Versus Liberty: Madison, Hamilton, Wilson, and Jefferson, University of Virginia Press, 201 pages; ISBN 978-0-8139-1912-6; Book
- Reed, Helen Scott Townsend (1991). Jefferson's Observation Tower Projects for Montalto and the University of Virginia, University of Virginia, 140 pages; Book
- Richards, Leonard L. (2000). The Slave Power: The Free North and Southern Domination, 1780–1860, LSU Press, 228 pages; ISBN 978-0-8071-2600-4; Book
- Risjord, Norman K. (1994). Thomas Jefferson, Rowman & Littlefield, 210 pages; ISBN 978-0-945612-39-1; Book
- —— (2009). Jefferson's America, 1760-1815. Rowman & Littlefield Publishers. ISBN 978-0-7425-6123-6.
- Rist, Boyd Clifton (1985). The Jeffersonian crisis revived: Virginia, the court, and the appellate jurisdiction controversy, University of Virginia, 634 pages; Book
- Robinson, William A. (2008). Jeffersonian Democracy in New England, Read Books, 196 pages; ISBN 978-1-4086-8201-2; Book
- Rogow, Arnold (1999). A Fatal Friendship: Alexander Hamilton and Aaron Burr, Macmillan, 368 pages; ISBN 978-0-8090-1621-1; Book
- Root, Erik S. (2008). All Honor to Jefferson?: The Virginia Slavery Debates and the Positive Good Thesis, Lexington Books, 255 pages; ISBN 978-0-7391-2218-1; Book
- Rutland, Robert Allen (1975). Madison's Alternatives: The Jeffersonian Republicans and the Coming of War, 1805–1812, Lippincott, 152 pages; ISBN 978-0-397-47331-1; Book
- Sargent, Lyman Tower (ed.) (1997). Political Thought in the United States: A Documentary History, New York University Press, 428 pages; ISBN 978-0-8147-8048-0; Book
- Schwarz, Philip J. (2010). Slave Laws in Virginia, University of Georgia Press, 272 pages; ISBN 978-0-8203-3516-2; Book
- Sears, Louis Martin (1927). Jefferson and the Embargo, Duke University Press, 338 pages; Book
- Seefeldt, Douglas; Hantman, Jeffrey L.; Onuf, Peter S. (2006). Across the Continent: Jefferson, Lewis and Clark, and the Making of America, University of Virginia Press, 222 pages; ISBN 978-0-8139-2595-0; Book
- Selby, John E. (2007). The Revolution in Virginia, 1775–1783, Colonial Williamsburg, 442 pages; ISBN 978-0-87935-233-2; Book
- Shannon, Joseph B. (1931). Thomas Jefferson, the Advocate of Truth, Freedom and Equality, C. S. Demaree Stationery Company, 31 pages; Book
- Sharp, James Roger (1993). American Politics in the Early Republic: The New Nation in Crisis, Yale University Press, 365 pages; ISBN 978-0-300-05530-6; Book
- —— (2010). The Deadlocked Election of 1800: Jefferson, Burr, and the Union in the Balance, University of Kansas Publications, 239 pages; ISBN 978-0-7006-1742-5; Book
- Schouler, James (1893). Thomas Jefferson, Dodd, Mead and Company, New York, 261 pages; e'Book
- Sheehan, Bernard W. (1974). Seeds of Extinction: Jeffersonian Philanthropy and the American Indian, W. W. Norton & Company, 301 pages; ISBN 978-0-393-00716-9; Book
- Sheldon, Garrett Ward (1991). The political philosophy of Thomas Jefferson, Johns Hopkins University Press, 174 pages; ISBN 978-0-8018-4142-2; Book
- Simon, James F. (2003). What Kind of Nation: Thomas Jefferson, John Marshall, and the Epic Struggle to Create a United States, Simon and Schuster, 352 pages; Book
- Sisson, Dan (1974). The American Revolution of 1800, Knopf Publishers, New York, 468 pages; ISBN 978-0-394-48476-1; Book
- Sloan, Herbert J. (2001). Principle and Interest: Thomas Jefferson and the Problem of Debt, University of Virginia Press, 377 pages; ISBN 978-0-8139-2093-1; Book
- Smelser, Marshall (1968). The Democratic Republic: 1801–1815 "New American Nation", Harper & Row, 369 pages (survey of political and diplomatic history), Book
- Smith, Gene Allen (1991). The Ruinous Folly of a Navy: A History of the Jeffersonian Gunboat Program, G.A. Smith (self publish), 280 pages; Book
- Smyth, Clifford (1866). Thomas Jefferson, the father of American democracy, Funk & Wagnalls Co., New York, London, Book1, Book2
- Spahn, Hannah (2011). Thomas Jefferson, Time, and History, University of Virginia Press, 290 pages; ISBN 978-0-8139-3168-5; Book
- Staloff, Darren (2005). Hamilton, Adams, Jefferson: The Politics of Enlightenment and the American Founding.
- Stanton, Lucia C. (2012). Those Who Labor for My Happiness: Slavery at Thomas Jefferson's Monticello, University of Virginia Press, 384 pages; ISBN 978-0-8139-3222-4; Book
- Steele, Brian (2012). Thomas Jefferson and American Nationhood, Cambridge University Press, 321 pages; ISBN 978-1-107-02070-2; Book
- Stevens, John Austin (1884). Albert Gallatin, Volume 13, Houghton, Mifflin, 419 pages; E'book
- —— ; Gillett, Pond, Nathan; Lamb, Martha Joanna (1890). The Magazine of American History with Notes and Queries, A.S. Barnes, New York, 523 pages; E'book
- Stewart, David O. (2012). American Emperor: Aaron Burr's Challenge to Jefferson's America, Simon and Schuster, 432 pages; ISBN 978-1-4391-5720-6; Book
- Stewart, John J. (1997). Thomas Jefferson: Forerunner to the Restoration, Cedar Fort, 96 pages; ISBN 978-0-88290-605-8; Book
- Stuart, Reginald C. (1978). The Half-way Pacifist: Thomas Jefferson's View of War, University of Toronto Press, 93 pages; ISBN 978-0-8020-5431-9; Book
- Tator, Henry H. (1852). An Oration Commemorative of the Character of Thomas Jefferson, Joel Munsell (publisher), 22 pages; E'book
- Thomas Jefferson Heritage Society (2001). The Jefferson-Hemings myth: an American travesty, Jefferson Editions, 207 pages; ISBN 978-0-934211-66-6; Book
- Tippen, Mary B. (1991). Thomas Jefferson: inconsistent values, University of Michigan-Flint, 152 pages; Book
- Tucker, Robert W.; Hendrickson, David C. (1990). Empire of Liberty: The Statecraft of Thomas Jefferson, Oxford University Press, 384 pages; ISBN 978-0-19-992345-8; Book
- Tucker, Spencer (1993). The Jeffersonian Gunboat Navy, University of South Carolina Press, 265 pages; ISBN 978-0-87249-849-5; Book
- Urofsky, Melvin I. (2001). The Levy Family and Monticello, 1834–1923: Saving Thomas Jefferson's House, Thomas Jefferson Foundation, 256 pages; ISBN 978-1-882886-16-6; Book
- —— ; Urofsky, Melvin I. (2006). Thomas Jefferson and John Marshall: "What Kind of Constitution Shall We Have?" Journal of Supreme Court History 31(2): 109–125. ISSN 1059-4329 Fulltext: in Swetswise, Ingenta and Ebsco
- Valsania, Maurizio (2004). Our Original Barbarism': Man Vs. Nature in Thomas Jefferson's Moral Experience, Journal of the History of Ideas, ISSN 0022-5037 Fulltext: in Project Muse and Swetswise
- —— (2013). Nature's Man: Thomas Jefferson's Philosophical Anthropology, University of Virginia Press, 204 pages; Book
- —— (2011). The Limits of Optimism: Thomas Jefferson's Dualistic Enlightenment , University of Virginia Press, 224 pages; ISBN 978-0-8139-3151-7; Book
- Wagoner, Jennings L. Jr. (2004). Jefferson and Education.
- Wallace, Anthony F.C. (2009). Jefferson and the Indians: The Tragic Fate of the First Americans, Harvard University Press, 416 pages; ISBN 978-0-674-04480-7; Book
- Wallace, D.D. (1911). Jefferson's Part in the Purchase of Louisiana, The Sewanee Review, E'book
- Wayland, John Walter (1907). The political opinions of Thomas Jefferson: an essay, The Neale Publishing Company, 98 pages; E'book1, E'book2
- Wheelan, Joseph (2004). Jefferson's War: America's First War on Terror 1801–1805. Carrol and Graf Publishers, New York, 464 pages; ISBN 0-7867-1232-5, Book
- —— (2005). Jefferson's Vendetta. Carrol and Graf Publishers, New York
- Whipple, Addison Beecher Colvin (2001). To the Shores of Tripoli: The Birth of the U.S. Navy and Marines,, Naval Institute Press, 357 pages; ISBN 1-55750-966-2; Book
- Wiggins, James Russell (1959). Jefferson Through the Fog: An Address Delivered at Monticello, April 13, 1959, Thomas Jefferson Memorial Foundation, 17 pages; Book
- White, Leonard Dupee (1948). The Federalists, Macmillan Company, 538 pages; Book
- Wilentz, Sean (2006). The Rise of American Democracy: Jefferson to Lincoln, W. W. Norton & Company, 1044 pages; ISBN 978-0-393-32921-6; Book
- Williams, John Sharp (1913). Thomas Jefferson. His Permanent Influence on American Institutions, Columbia University Press, New York, 330 pages; E'book1, E'book2
- Wills, Garry (2005). Negro President: Jefferson and the Slave Power, Houghton Mifflin Harcourt, 274 pages; ISBN 978-0-618-48537-6 Book
- —— (2007). Henry Adams and the Making of America, Houghton Mifflin Harcourt, 467 pages; ISBN 978-0-618-87266-4; Book
- —— (2007). Mr. Jefferson's University, National Geographic Books, 162 pages; ISBN 978-1-4262-0181-3; Book
- Wilson, Douglas L.; Stanton, Lucia C. (1999). Jefferson Abroad, Modern Library, 338 pages; ISBN 978-0-679-60319-1; Book
- Winik, Jay (2007). The Great Upheaval Harper-Collins Publishers, New York; 661 pages; ISBN 978-0-06-182671-9; Book
- Wise, James Waterman (1943). Thomas Jefferson then and now, 1743–1943: a national symposium, Bill of Rights Sesqui-centennial Committee, 143 pages; Book
- Wolfe, John Harold (1940). Jeffersonian Democracy in South Carolina, The University of North Carolina press, 308 pages; Book
- Wood, Gordon S. (1998). The Creation of the American Republic: 1776–1787, University of North Carolina Press, 653 pages; ISBN 978-0-8078-4723-7; Book
- —— (2006). Revolutionary Characters: What Made the Founders Different, Penguin, 321 pages; ISBN 978-1-59420-093-9; Book
- —— (2009). Empire of Liberty: A History of the Early Republic, 1789–1815, Oxford University Press, 800 pages, ISBN 978-0-19-974109-0, Book
- Wright, Robert E. (2008). One Nation Under Debt : Hamilton, Jefferson, and the History of What We Owe, McGraw Hill Professional, 419 pages; ISBN 978-0-07-154394-1; Book
- Zacks, Richard (2005). The Pirate Coast: Thomas Jefferson, the First Marines, and the Secret Mission of 1805, Hyperion, New York, 432 pages, ISBN 978-1-4013-0003-6; Book

=== Religion ===
- Adamson, Barry (2008). Freedom of Religion, the First Amendment, and the Supreme Court, Pelican Publishing, 422 pages; ISBN 978-1-4556-0458-6; Book
- Beliles, Mark; Newcombe, Jerry (2014) Doubting Thomas: The Religious Life and Legacy of Thomas Jefferson, Morgan James Publishing, 520 pages; Book
- Blanshard, Paul (1963). Religion and the schools: the great controversy, Beacon Press, 265 pages; Book
- Braden, Bruce (2008). Ye Will Say I Am No Christian: The Thomas Jefferson/John Adams Correspondence on Religion, Morals, and Values, Prometheus Books, 257 pages; ISBN 978-1-61592-227-7; Book
- Dreisbach, Daniel L. (2002). Thomas Jefferson and the Wall of Separation between Church and State. New York: New York University Press. Archived from the original on December 1, 2017 – via Questia.
- Eidsmoe, John (1995). Christianity and the Constitution: The Faith of Our Founding Fathers, Baker Publishing Group, 480 pages; ISBN 978-0-8010-5231-6; Book
- Foote, Henry Wilder (1947). Thomas Jefferson: Champion of Religious Freedom : Advocate of Christian Morale, Beacon Press, 70 pages; Book
- —— (1960). The Religion of Thomas Jefferson, Beacon Press, 86 pages; Book
- Gaustad, Edwin S. (2001). Sworn on the Altar of God: A Religious Biography of Thomas Jefferson, Book1 Book 1; Book2 Book 2
- Hall, J. Lesslie (1913). The Religious Opinions of Thomas Jefferson, The Sewanee Review, 13 pages; E'book
- Hall, Timothy; Hall, Timothy L. (1998). Separating Church and State, University of Illinois Press, 206 pages; ISBN 978-0-252-06664-1; Book
- Hamburger, Philip (2009). Separation of Church and State, Harvard University Press, 528 pages; ISBN 978-0-674-03818-9; Book
- Healey, Robert M. (1970). Jefferson on Religion in Public Education, Archon Books, 294 pages; ISBN 978-0-208-00841-1; Book
- Irons, Charles F. (2009). Origins of Proslavery Christianity, Univ of North Carolina Press, 384 pages; ISBN 978-0-8078-8889-6; Book
- Jackson, Henry E., Ed., (1923). The Thomas Jefferson Bible,
- Lambert, Frank (2003). The Founding Fathers and the Place of Religion in America, Princeton University, 328 pages; ISBN 978-0-691-08829-7; Book
- Meyerson, Michael I. (2012). Endowed by Our Creator: The Birth of Religious Freedom in America, Yale University Press, 320 pages; ISBN 978-0-300-18349-8; Book
- Muñoz, Vincent Phillip (2009). God and the Founders: Madison, Washington, and Jefferson, Cambridge University Press, 242 pages; ISBN 978-0-521-51515-3; Book
- Peach, John Harding (2012). Thomas Jefferson: Roots of Religious Freedom, CrossBooks, 364 pages; ISBN 978-1-4627-2052-1; Book
- Peterson, Merrill D.; Vaughan, Robert C. (2003). The Virginia Statute for Religious Freedom: Its Evolution and Consequences in American History, Cambridge University Press, 392 pages; ISBN 978-0-521-89298-8; Book
- Sanford, Charles B. The Religious Life of Thomas Jefferson (1987) University of Virginia Press, ISBN 0-8139-1131-1, Book
- Sheldon, Garrett Ward; Dreisbach, Daniel L. (2000). Religion and political culture in Jefferson's Virginia, Rowman & Littlefield, 236 pages; ISBN 978-0-7425-0774-6; Book
- Sheridan, Eugene R. (2001). Jefferson and Religion, preface by Martin Marty, University of North Carolina Press, ISBN 1-882886-08-9; Book
- Vicchio, Stephen J. (2007) Jefferson's Religion, Wipf and Stock Publishers, 158 pages; ISBN 978-1-4982-7129-5; Book
- West, Ellis M. (2012). The Religion Clauses of the First Amendment, Lexington Books, 250 pages; ISBN 978-0-7391-4679-8; Book
- Witte, John (2000). Religion and the American Constitutional Experiment: Essential Rights and Liberties, Westview Press, 379 pages; ISBN 978-0-8133-3306-9; Book

=== Legacy and historiography ===
- Cogliano, Francis D. (2008). Thomas Jefferson: Reputation and Legacy. Edinburgh University Press, 276 pages., Book
- Cogliano, Francis D. (2012). Cogliano, Francis D. (ed.). A Companion to Thomas Jefferson. Malden, MA: Wiley-Blackwell. Archived from the original on June 12, 2015 – via Questia.
- Gordon-Reed, Annette. Thomas Jefferson and Sally Hemings: An American controversy, Charlottesville, Virginia: University of Virginia Press, 1997 (reprint 1998 to include discussion of DNA analysis) Book
- Gilreath, Thomas; Gilreath, James; Wilson, Douglas L. (2010). Thomas Jefferson's Library, The Lawbook Exchange, Ltd., 162 pages; ISBN 978-1-58477-824-0; Book
- Onuf, Peter (October 1993). "The Scholars' Jefferson," William and Mary Quarterly 3d Series, L:4, 671–699. Historiographical review or scholarship about TJ; in JSTOR
- —— ed. (1993). Jeffersonian Legacies, University of Virginia Press, 478 pages; Book
- Peter S., ed. (with Jan Ellen Lewis) (1999). Sally Hemings and Thomas Jefferson: History, Memory, and Civic Culture, University Press of Virginia Google preview.
- Perry, Barbara A. "Jefferson's Legacy to the Supreme Court: Freedom of Religion", Journal of Supreme Court History 2006 31(2): 181–198. ISSN 1059-4329
- Peterson, Merrill D. (1960). The Jefferson Image in the American Mind. University of Virginia Press, 548 pages. Book; Bancroft Prize
- Taylor, Jeff (2006). Where Did the Party Go?: William Jennings Bryan, Hubert Humphrey, and the Jeffersonian Legacy, University of Missouri Press, 373 pages; ISBN 978-0-8262-1661-8; Book
- Wilson, Douglas L. (1992). Thomas Jefferson and the Character Issue, The Atlantic Monthly, Article
- Wiltse, Charles Maurice (1935). The Jeffersonian Tradition in American Democracy, University of North Carolina Press, 273 pages; Book
- "Thomas Jefferson", PBS interviews with 24 historians

=== Scholarly studies ===
- Adams, Herbert Baxter (1888). Thomas Jefferson and the University of Virginia. U.S. Government Printing Office.
- Alexander, Leslie (2010). Encyclopedia of African American History (American Ethnic Experience). ABC-CLIO. ISBN 978-1-85109-769-2.
- Ambrose, Stephen E. (1996). Undaunted Courage: Meriwether Lewis, Thomas Jefferson, and the Opening of the American West. Simon and Schuster. ISBN 978-0-684-81107-9.
- Andresen, Julie (2006). Linguistics in America 1769–1924: A Critical History. Routledge. ISBN 978-1-134-97611-9.
- Andrews, Stuart. "Thomas Jefferson and the French Revolution" History Today (May 1968), Vol. 18 Issue 5, pp. 299–306.
- Appleby, Joyce Oldham (2003). Thomas Jefferson: The American Presidents Series: The 3rd President, 1801–1809. Henry Holt and Company. ISBN 978-0-8050-6924-2.
- Bailey, Jeremy D. (2007). Thomas Jefferson and Executive Power. Twenty-First Century Books. ISBN 978-1-139-46629-5.
- Banner, James M. Jr. (1974). C. Vann Woodward (ed.). Responses of the Presidents to Charges of Misconduct. Delacorte Press Dell Publishing Co., Inc. ISBN 978-0-440-05923-3.
- Banning, Lance. The Jeffersonian persuasion: evolution of a party ideology (1978) online
- Bassani, Luigi Marco (2010). Liberty, State & Union: The Political Theory of Thomas Jefferson. Mercer University Press. ISBN 978-0-88146-186-2.
- Bear, James Adam (1967). Jefferson at Monticello. University of Virginia Press. ISBN 978-0-8139-0022-3.
- —— (1974). "The Last Few Days in the Life of Thomas Jefferson". Magazine of Albemarle County History. 32: 77.
- Bernstein, Richard B. (2003). Thomas Jefferson. Oxford University Press. ISBN 978-0-19-518130-2.
- —— (2004). The Revolution of Ideas. Oxford University Press. ISBN 978-0-19-514368-3.
- Berry, Trey; Beasley, Pam; Clements, Jeanne (2006). The Forgotten Expedition, 1804–1805: The Louisiana Purchase Journals of Dunbar and Hunter. LSU Press. ISBN 978-0-8071-3165-7.
- Bober, Natalie (2008). Thomas Jefferson: Draftsman of a Nation. University of Virginia Press. ISBN 978-0-8139-2732-9.
- Boles, John B. (2017). Jefferson: Architect of American Liberty. Basic Books,626 pages. ISBN 978-0-465-09469-1.
- Brodie, Fawn (1974). Thomas Jefferson: An Intimate History. W. W. Norton & Company. ISBN 978-0-393-31752-7.
- Bowers, Claude (1945). The Young Jefferson 1743–1789. Houghton Mifflin Company.
- Burstein, Andrew (2006). Jefferson's Secrets: Death and Desire at Monticello. Basic Books. ISBN 978-0-465-00813-1.
- ——; Isenberg, Nancy (2010). Madison and Jefferson. Random House. ISBN 978-1-4000-6728-2.
- —— (2015). Democracy's Muse: How Thomas Jefferson Became an FDR Liberal, a Reagan Republican, and a Tea Party Fanatic, All the While Being Dead. University of Virginia Press. ISBN 978-0-8139-3722-9.
- Chernow, Ron (2004). Alexander Hamilton. Penguin Press. ISBN 978-1-59420-009-0.
- Jefferson, Thomas (1926). Chinard, Gilbert (ed.). The Commonplace Book of Thomas Jefferson: A Repertory of His Ideas on Government, with an Introduction and Notes by Gilbert Chinard, Volume 2. ISBN 978-1-4008-6009-8.
- Cogliano, Francis D (2008). Thomas Jefferson: Reputation and Legacy. Edinburgh University Press. ISBN 978-0-7486-2499-7.
- Cooke, Jacob E. (1970). "The Compromise of 1790". William and Mary Quarterly. 27 (4): 523–545. doi:10.2307/1919703. JSTOR 1919703.
- Cunningham, Vinson (December 28, 2020). "What Thomas Jefferson Could Never Understand About Jesus". newyorker.com.
- Crawford, Alan Pell (2008). Twilight at Monticello: The Final Years of Thomas Jefferson. Random House Digital. ISBN 978-1-4000-6079-5.
- Davis, David Brion (1999). The Problem of Slavery in the Age of Revolution, 1770–1823. Oxford University Press. ISBN 978-0-19-988083-6.
- Du Bois, William Edward Burghardt (1904). The suppression of the African slave-trade to the United States of America. Longmans, Green and Co. ISBN 978-0-7222-7284-8.
- Earle, Edward Mead (1927). "American Interest in the Greek Cause, 1821–1827". The American Historical Review. 33 (1): 44–63. doi:10.2307/1838110. ISSN 0002-8762. JSTOR 1838110.
- Elkins, Stanley M.; McKitrick, Eric L. (1993). The Age of Federalism. Oxford University Press. ISBN 978-0-19-506890-0.
- Ellis, Joseph J. (1996). American Sphinx: The Character of Thomas Jefferson. Alfred A. Knopf. ISBN 978-0-679-44490-9. online free
- —— (2000). Thomas Jefferson: Genius of Liberty. Viking Studio. ISBN 978-0-670-88933-4.
- —— (2003). Founding Brothers: The Revolutionary Generation. Knopf Doubleday Publishing Group. ISBN 978-1-4000-7768-7.
- —— (2008). American Creation: Triumphs and Tragedies in the Founding of the Republic. Random House LLC. ISBN 978-0-307-26369-8.
- Ferling, John (2000). Setting the World Ablaze: Washington, Adams, Jefferson, and the American Revolution. Oxford University Press. ISBN 978-0-19-513409-4.
- —— (2004). Adams vs. Jefferson: The Tumultuous Election of 1800. Oxford University Press. ISBN 978-0-19-516771-9.
- —— (2013). Jefferson and Hamilton: the rivalry that forged a nation. Bloomsbury Press. ISBN 978-1-60819-542-8.
- Finkelman, Paul (1989). "Evading the Ordinance: The Persistence of Bondage in Indiana and Illinois". Journal of the Early Republic. 9 (1): 21–51. doi:10.2307/3123523. JSTOR 3123523.
- Finkelman, Paul, ed. (2006). The Encyclopedia of American Civil Liberties A-F Index. Vol. 1. Taylor & Francis Group. ISBN 978-1-135-94704-0.
- Finkelman, Paul (April 1994). "Thomas Jefferson and Antislavery: The Myth Goes On" (PDF). The Virginia Magazine of History and Biography. Vol. 102, no. 2. Virginia Historical Society. pp. 193–228.
- Foster, Eugene A.; et al. (November 5, 1998). "Jefferson fathered slave's last child". Nature. 396 (6706): 27–28. Bibcode:1998Natur.396...27F. doi:10.1038/23835. PMID 9817200. S2CID 4424562.
- Frawley, William J., ed. (2003). "International Encyclopedia of Linguistics: 4-Volume Set". International Encyclopedia of Linguistics. Oxford University Press. ISBN 978-0-19-513977-8.
- Freehling, William W. (2005). Levinson, Sanford; Sparrow, Bartholomew H. (eds.). The Louisiana Purchase and American Expansion, 1803–1898 The Louisiana Purchase and the Coming of the Civil War. New York: Rowman & Littlefield Publishers, Inc. pp. 69–82. ISBN 978-0-7425-4983-8.
- Freeman, Joanne B. (2008). Shuffelton, Frank (ed.). The Cambridge Companion to Thomas Jefferson. Cambridge & New York: Cambridge University Press. ISBN 978-0-521-86731-3.
- Gish, Dustin, and Daniel Klinghard. Thomas Jefferson and the Science of Republican Government: A Political Biography of Notes on the State of Virginia (Cambridge University Press, 2017) excerpt.
- Fremont-Barnes, Gregory (2006). The Wars of the Barbary Pirates: To the Shores of Tripoli – The Rise of the US Navy and Marines. Osprey Publishing. ISBN 978-1-84603-030-7.
- Golden, James L.; Golden, Alan L. (2002). Thomas Jefferson and the Rhetoric of Virtue. Rowman & Littlefield. ISBN 978-0-7425-2080-6.
- Gordon-Reed, Annette (1997). Thomas Jefferson and Sally Hemings: An American Controversy. University Press of Virginia. ISBN 978-0-8139-1698-9.
- —— (2008). The Hemingses of Monticello: An American Family. W. W. Norton & Company. ISBN 978-0-393-06477-3.
- Gordon-Reed, Annette; Onuf, Peter S. (April 13, 2016). "Most Blessed of the Patriarchs": Thomas Jefferson and the Empire of the Imagination. W. W. Norton & Company. ISBN 978-1-63149-078-1.; online review
- Gordon-Reed, Annette (February 20, 2020). "Thomas Jefferson's Vision of Equality Was Not All-Inclusive. But It Was Transformative". Archived from the original on March 12, 2022.
- Greider, William (2010). Who Will Tell the People. Simon & Schuster. ISBN 978-1-4391-2874-9.
- Halliday, E. M. (2009). Understanding Thomas Jefferson. Harper Collins. ISBN 978-0-06-019793-3.
- Hamelman, Steven (January 1, 2002). "Autobiography and Archive: Franklin, Jefferson, and the Revised Self". Midwest Quarterly.
- Harrison, John Houston (1935). Settlers by the Long Grey Trail: Some Pioneers to Old Augusta County, Virginia, and Their Descendants of the Family of Harrison and Allied Lines. Genealogical Publishing Com. ISBN 978-0-8063-0664-3.
- Hart, Charles Henry (1899). Browere's Life Masks of Great Americans. De Vinne Press for Doubleday and McClure Company.
- Hayes, Kevin J. (2008). The Road to Monticello: The Life and Mind of Thomas Jefferson. Oxford University Press. ISBN 978-0-19-530758-0.
- Hellenbrand, Harold (1990). The Unfinished Revolution: Education and Politics in the Thought of Thomas Jefferson. Associated University Presse. ISBN 978-0-87413-370-7.
- Helo, Ari (2013). Thomas Jefferson's Ethics and the Politics of Human Progress: The Morality of a Slaveholder. Cambridge University Press. ISBN 978-1-107-43555-1.
- Hendricks, Nancy (2015). America's First Ladies. Santa Barbara, CA: ABC-CLIO, LLC. ISBN 978-1-61069-883-2.
- Herring, George C. (2008). From Colony to Superpower: U.S. Foreign Relations since 1776. Oxford University Press. ISBN 978-0-19-974377-3.
- Hogan, Pendleton (1987). The Lawn: A Guide to Jefferson's University. University Press of Virginia. ISBN 978-0-8139-1109-0.
- Horton, Andrew S. (1976). "Jefferson and Korais: The American Revolution and the Greek Constitution". Comparative Literature Studies. 13 (4): 323–329. ISSN 0010-4132. JSTOR 40246007.
- Howe, Daniel Walker (2009). Making the American Self: Jonathan Edwards to Abraham Lincoln. Oxford University Press. ISBN 978-0-19-974079-6.
- Hyland, William G (2009). In Defense of Thomas Jefferson: The Sally Hemings Sex Scandal. Carolina Academic Press. ISBN 978-0-89089-085-1.
- Jacavone, Jared (2017). The Paid Vote: America's Neutrality During the Greek War for Independence (MA thesis). University of Rhode Island. doi:10.23860/thesis-jacavone-jared-2017.
- Jayne, Allen (2014). Jefferson's Declaration of Independence: Origins, Philosophy, and Theology. University Press of Kentucky. ISBN 978-0-8131-4836-6.
- Johnson, Jeffrey K. (2010). "The Countryside Triumphant: Jefferson's Ideal of Rural Superiority in Modern Superhero Mythology". The Journal of Popular Culture. 43 (4): 720–737. doi:10.1111/j.1540-5931.2010.00767.x.
- Kaplan, Lawrence S. (1999). Thomas Jefferson: Westward the Course of Empire. Rowman & Littlefield. ISBN 978-0-8420-2630-7.
- Kaufman, Will; Macpherson, Heidi Slettedahl (2005). Britain and the Americas: Culture, Politics, and History. ABC-CLIO. ISBN 978-1-85109-431-8.
- Keyssar, Alexander (2009). The Right to Vote: The Contested History of Democracy in the United States. Basic Books. ISBN 978-0-465-01014-1.
- Maier, Pauline (1997). American Scripture: Making the Declaration of Independence. Knopf. ISBN 978-0-679-45492-2.
- Malone, Dumas, ed. (1933). "Jefferson, Thomas". Dictionary of American Biography. Vol. 10. Charles Scribner's Sons. pp. 17–35.
- Malone, Dumas. Jefferson (6 vol. 1948–1981)
  - —— (1948). Jefferson, The Virginian. Jefferson and His Time. Vol. 1. Little Brown. OCLC 1823927., Ebook
  - —— (1951). Jefferson and the Rights of Man. Jefferson and His Time. Vol. 2. Little Brown.
  - —— (1962). Jefferson and the Ordeal of Liberty. Jefferson and His Time. Vol. 3. Little, Brown. ISBN 978-0-316-54475-7.
  - —— (1970). Jefferson the President: First Term, 1801–1805. Jefferson and His Time. Vol. 4. Little Brown.
  - —— (1974). Jefferson the President: Second Term, 1805–1809. Jefferson and His Time. Vol. 5. Little Brown. OCLC 1929523.
  - —— (1981). The Sage of Monticello. Jefferson and His Time. Vol. 6. Little Brown. ISBN 978-0-316-54478-8.
- Mapp, Alf J. (1991). Jefferson: Passionate Pilgrim. Rowman & Littlefield. ISBN 978-0-517-09888-2.
- Mayer, David N. (1994). The Constitutional Thought of Thomas Jefferson (Constitutionalism and Democracy). University of Virginia Press. ISBN 978-0-8139-1485-5.
- Mayer, David (2008). "Jefferson, Thomas (1743–1826)". In Hamowy, Ronald (ed.). The Encyclopedia of Libertarianism. Thousand Oaks, CA: Sage; Cato Institute. pp. 262–263. doi:10.4135/9781412965811.n158. ISBN 978-1-4129-6580-4. LCCN 2008009151. OCLC 750831024.
- McCullough, David (2001). John Adams. Simon & Schuster. ISBN 978-1-4711-0452-7.
- McDonald, Robert M. S. (2004). Thomas Jefferson's Military Academy: Founding West Point. Jeffersonian America. University of Virginia Press. ISBN 978-0-8139-2298-0.
- McEwan, Barbara (1991). Thomas Jefferson, Farmer. McFarland. ISBN 978-0-89950-633-3.
- Meacham, Jon (2012). Thomas Jefferson: The Art of Power. Random House LLC. ISBN 978-0-679-64536-8.
- —— (2013). Thomas Jefferson: The Art of Power (Paperback). Random House Trade Paperbacks. ISBN 978-0-8129-7948-0.
- Miller, John Chester (1980). The Wolf by the Ears: Thomas Jefferson and Slavery. University of Virginia Press. ISBN 978-0-452-00530-3.
- Miller, Robert J. (2008). Native America, Discovered and Conquered: Thomas Jefferson, Lewis & Clark, and Manifest Destiny. University of Nebraska Press. ISBN 978-0-8032-1598-6.
- Onuf, Peters S. (2000). Jefferson's Empire: The Language of American Nationhood. U of Virginia Press. ISBN 978-0-8139-2204-1.
- —— (2007). The Mind of Thomas Jefferson. University of Virginia Press. ISBN 978-0-8139-2611-7.
- Peterson, Merrill D. (1960). The Jefferson Image in the American Mind. University of Virginia Press. ISBN 978-0-8139-1851-8.
- —— (1970). Thomas Jefferson and the New Nation; a Biography. Oxford University Press. ISBN 978-0-19-500054-2.
- —— (2002). "Thomas Jefferson". In Graff, Henry (ed.). The Presidents: A Reference History (7th ed.). Charles Scribner's Sons. pp. 39–56.
- Phillips, Julieanne (1997). "Northwest Ordinance (1787)". In Rodriguez, Junius (ed.). The Historical Encyclopedia of World Slavery. ABC-CLIO. pp. 473–474. ISBN 978-0-87436-885-7.
- Randall, Willard Sterne (1994). Thomas Jefferson: A Life. Harper Collins. ISBN 978-0-06-097617-0.
- Randall, Willard Sterne (1996). "Thomas Jefferson Takes A Vacation". American Heritage. Vol. 47, no. 4.
- Rodriguez, Junius (2002). The Louisiana Purchase: a historical and geographical encyclopedia. ABC-CLIO. ISBN 978-1-57607-188-5.
- Stewart, John J. (1997). Thomas Jefferson: Forerunner to the Restoration. Cedar Fort. ISBN 978-0-88290-605-8.
- Sheehan, Bernard (1974). Seeds of Extinction: Jeffersonian Philanthropy and the American Indian. W. W. Norton & Company. ISBN 978-0-393-00716-9.
- Scythes, James (2014). Tucker, Spencer C. (ed.). The Encyclopedia of the Wars of the Early American Republic, 1783–1812 A Political, Social, and Military History. Santa Barbara, CA: ABC-CLIO. ISBN 978-1-59884-156-5.
- Shuffelton, Frank (1974). "Introduction". In Jefferson, Thomas. (ed.). Notes on the State of Virginia. Penguin. ISBN 978-0-14-043667-9.
- Smith, Robert C. (2003). Encyclopedia of African American Politics. Infobase Publishing, 433 pages. ISBN 978-1-4381-3019-4.
- Tucker, George (1837). The Life of Thomas Jefferson, Third President of the United States; 2 vol. Carey, Lea & Blanchard.
- —— (1990). Empire of Liberty: The Statecraft of Thomas Jefferson. Cogliano Press. ISBN 978-0-19-802276-3.
- Urofsky, Melvin I., ed. (2006). Biographical Encyclopedia of the Supreme Court: The Lives and Legal Philosophies of the Justices. CQ Press. ISBN 978-1-4522-6728-9.
- Wiencek, Henry (2012). Master of the Mountain: Thomas Jefferson and his slaves. Macmillan.
- Wilentz, Sean (2005). The Rise of American Democracy. W. W. Norton & Company. pp. 108–111. ISBN 978-0-393-05820-8.
- Wilson, Steven Harmon (2012). The U.S. Justice System: Law and constitution in early America. ABC-CLIO. ISBN 978-1-59884-304-0.
- Wood, Gordon S (2006). Revolutionary Characters: What Made the Founders Different. Penguin Press. ISBN 978-1-59420-093-9.
- —— (2010). Empire of Liberty: A History of the Early Republic, 1789–1815. Oxford University Press. ISBN 978-0-19-503914-6.
- —— (2011). The Idea of America: Reflections on the Birth of the United States. Penguin Press. ISBN 978-1-59420-290-2.

==== Thomas Jefferson Foundation sources ====
Thomas Jefferson Foundation (Main page and site-search)

- "American Philosophical Society". Thomas Jefferson Foundation.
- "Coded Messages". Thomas Jefferson Foundation.
- "Embargo of 1807". Thomas Jefferson Foundation.
- "I Rise with the Sun". Thomas Jefferson Foundation.
- "Italy – Language". Thomas Jefferson Foundation.
- "James Madison". Thomas Jefferson Foundation.
- "Jefferson's Antislavery Actions". Thomas Jefferson Foundation.
- "Jefferson's Religious Beliefs". Thomas Jefferson Foundation.
- "Landscape of Slavery – Mulberry Row at Monticello: Treatment". Thomas Jefferson Foundation.
- "Maria Cosway (Engraving)". Thomas Jefferson Foundation.
- "Minority Report of the Monticello Research Committee on Thomas Jefferson and Sally Hemings". Thomas Jefferson Foundation.
- "Monticello construction chronology". Thomas Jefferson Foundation.
- "Monticello (House) FAQ – Who built the house?". Thomas Jefferson Foundation.
- "Nailery". Thomas Jefferson Foundation.
- "President Jefferson and the Indian Nations". Thomas Jefferson Foundation.
- "Public Speaking". Thomas Jefferson Foundation.
- "Quotations on Slavery and Emancipation". Thomas Jefferson Foundation. Archived from the original on August 20, 2016.
- "Report of the Research Committee on Thomas Jefferson and Sally Hemings – Conclusions". Thomas Jefferson Foundation.
- "Sale of Monticello". Thomas Jefferson Foundation.
- "Slave Dwellings". Thomas Jefferson Foundation. Archived from the original on March 4, 2016.
- "Slavery at Monticello FAQ – Property". Thomas Jefferson Foundation.
- "Slavery at Monticello FAQ – Work". Thomas Jefferson Foundation.
- "Spanish Language". Thomas Jefferson Foundation.
- "Thomas Jefferson: A Brief Biography". Thomas Jefferson Foundation.
- "Thomas Jefferson and Sally Hemings: A Brief Account". Thomas Jefferson Foundation.
- "Thomas Jefferson and Slavery". Thomas Jefferson Foundation.
- "Thomas Jefferson's Enlightenment and American Indians". Thomas Jefferson Foundation.
- "Thomas Jefferson's Religious Beliefs". Thomas Jefferson Foundation.

==== Web site sources ====
- "Gathering Voices: Thomas Jefferson and Native America". American Philosophical Society. Archived from the original on August 13, 2016.
- "Thomas Jefferson to Horatio G. Spafford, 17 March 1814". U.S. Government: National Archives.
- "American President: A Reference Resource". University of Virginia: Miller Center. Archived from the original on August 26, 2014.
- Barger, Herbert (October 15, 2008). "The Jefferson-Hemings DNA Study". Jefferson DNA Study Group.
- "Carving History". Mount Rushmore National Memorial. National Park Service.
- Finkelman, Paul (November 30, 2012). "The Monster of Monticello". The New York Times.
- Haimann, Alexander T. (May 16, 2006). "5-cent Jefferson". Arago, Smithsonian Institution.
- "Jefferson's library". Library of Congress. April 24, 2000.
- "Jefferson Nickel". U.S. Mint.
- "Jefferson's Vision of the Academical Village". University of Virginia. October 14, 2010. Archived from the original on December 25, 2015.
- "Martha Wayles Skelton Jefferson". whitehouse.gov – via National Archives.
- Roberts, Gary Boyd (April–May 1993). "The Royal Descents of Jane Pierce, Alice and Edith Roosevelt, Helen Taft, Eleanor Roosevelt, and Barbara Bush". American Ancestors. New England Historic Genealogical Society.
- Rottinghaus, Brandon; Vaughn, Justin S. (February 13, 2015). "Measuring Obama against the great presidents". Brookings Institution.
- "The Jefferson Hemings Controversy – Report of The Scholars Commission: Summary" (PDF). Thomas Jefferson Heritage Society. 2011 [2001]. pp. 8–9, 11, 15–17. Archived from the original (PDF) on September 18, 2016.
- "Siena Poll: American Presidents". Siena Research Institute. July 6, 2010. Archived from the original on July 6, 2010.
- "Thomas Jefferson: Biography". National Park Service.
- "The Thomas Jefferson Papers Timeline: 1743–1827".
- "Thomas Jefferson Presidential $1 Coin". U.S. Mint. Archived from the original on August 11, 2016.
- "U.S. Currency: $2 Note". U.S. Bureau of Engraving and Printing.
- "The Life and Morals of Jesus of Nazareth". 1820.
- "Bookquick/"The Autobiography of Thomas Jefferson, 1743–1790" | Penn Current". Archived from the original on December 8, 2015.
- Konig, David T. "Jefferson Thomas and the Practice of_Law, Three cases".
- "The Burr Conspiracy". PBS American Experience. 2000.
- Wilson, Douglas L. (1992). "Thomas Jefferson and the Issue of Character". The Atlantic.
- "Thomas Jefferson's descendants unite over a troubled past". CBS News. February 14, 2019.
- "Thomas Jefferson and Sally Hemings A Brief Account". monticello.org.
- Peter, Carlson (September 27, 2017). "The Bible According to Thomas Jefferson". historynet.com.

=== Teaching methods ===
- Smith, Mark A. (2009). "Teaching Jefferson". The History Teacher. 42 (3): 329–340. JSTOR 40543539.

== Primary sources ==
- Jefferson, Thomas; Randolph, J. W. (Ed.) (1853). Notes on the State of Virginia, E'book1, E'book2
- —— (1953). Thomas Jefferson's Farm Book: With Commentary and Relevant Extracts from Other Writings, American Philosophical Society, 552 pages; Book, Search contents at Massachusetts Historical Society
- —— (1802). Jefferson's Letter to the Danbury Baptists (Separation of Church and State), The Draft and Recently Discovered Text, Library of Congress, LOC listing
- —— (2004). Quotes by Thomas Jefferson, Applewood Books, 32 pages; ISBN 978-1-55709-940-2; Book
- —— (2011). Jefferson on Freedom: Wisdom, Advice, and Hints on Freedom, Democracy, and the American Way, Skyhorse Publishing Company, 139 pages; ISBN 978-1-61608-289-5; Book
- ——; The Life and Morals of Jesus of Nazareth, Government Printing Office, Washington DC, E'book1, E'book2
- —— (1900). The Jefferson Cyclopedia, large collection of TJ quotations arranged by 9000 topics; searchable; online E'book
- ——; The Thomas Jefferson Papers, 1606–1827, 27,000 original manuscript documents at the Library of Congress online collection
- —— (1809). Memoirs of the Hon. Thomas Jefferson, Secretary of State, Vice-President, and President of the United States of America, 404 pages; New York, E'book
- —— (2011). Jefferson on Freedom: Wisdom, Advice, and Hints on Freedom, Democracy, and the American Way, Skyhorse Publishing Company, Incorporated, 139 pages; ISBN 978-1-61608-289-5; Book
- —— (1851). An essay towards facilitating instruction in the Anglo-Saxon and modern dialects of the English language, for the use of the University of Virginia, 51 pages; E'book

=== Edited primary sources ===
- ——; Appleby, Joyce; Hall, Terence Ball; (eds.) (1999). Thomas Jefferson, Political Writings, Cambridge University Press, 623 pages; ISBN 978-0-521-64841-7; Book
- ——; Baron, Robert C. (ed.) (1987). The garden and farm books of Thomas Jefferson, Fulcrum Publishing, 528 pages; ISBN 978-1-55591-013-6; Book

- ——; Bregh, Albert Ellery (1903). The Writings of Thomas Jefferson Vol II, The Thomas Jefferson Memorial Association, Washington, 450 pages; E'book
- ——; —— (1903). The Writings of Thomas Jefferson Vol X, The Thomas Jefferson Memorial Association, Washington, 448 pages; E'book
- ——; —— (1903). The Writings of Thomas Jefferson Vol XII, The Thomas Jefferson Memorial Association, Washington, 441 pages; E'book
- ——; —— (1904). The writings of Thomas Jefferson, Volume: 15–16, Thomas Jefferson Memorial Association, 472 pages; E'book
- ——; —— (1905). The Writings of Thomas Jefferson 19 vol., Thomas Jefferson Memorial Association, E'book

- ——; Betts, Edwin Morris (ed.), Thomas Jefferson's Farm Book, (Thomas Jefferson Memorial: December 1, 1953) ISBN 1-882886-10-0.
- ——; Boyd, Julian P. et al., (eds.) The Papers of Thomas Jefferson. (1950–2012, in process) The definitive multi-volume edition; available at major academic libraries. 38 volumes covers TJ to Nov. 1802.
- ——; Brandt, Anthony (2007). Thomas Jefferson Travels: Selected Writings, 1784–1789, National Geographic Books, 388 pages; ISBN 978-1-4262-0058-8; Book
- ——; Butterfield, Lyman Henry; Cullen, Charles T. (2008). The Papers of Thomas Jefferson: 1 May to July 31, 1801, Princeton University Press, 767 pages; ISBN 978-0-691-13557-1; Book
- —— ; Cabell, Nathaniel Francis; Cabell, Joseph Carrington (1856). Early history of the University of Virginia, J. W. Randolph, publisher, 528 pages; E'book
- ——; ——; ——; John Catanzariti (2012). The Papers of Thomas Jefferson: July 1 to November 12, 1802, Princeton University Press, 755 pages; ISBN 978-0-691-15323-0; Book
- ——; Cappon, Lester J., (ed.) (1959). The Adams-Jefferson Letters, University of North Carolina Press, ISBN 978-0-8078-4230-0, Book
- ——; Catchings, Benjamin S. (1907). Master Thoughts of Thomas Jefferson, Nation Press, 196 pages; E'book1, E'book2
- ——; Chinard, Gilbert (ed.) (1926). The Commonplace Book of Thomas Jefferson: A Repertory of His Ideas on Government, The Johns Hopkins Press, 403 pages; Book
- ——; Dwight, Theodore Dwight (1839). The character of Thomas Jefferson: as exhibited in his own writings, Weeks, Jordan & Company, 371 pages E'book
- ——; Foley, John P. (ed.) (1900). The Jeffersonian Cyclopedia: A Comprehensive Collection of the Views of Thomas Jefferson ..., Funk and Wangalls Company, 1009 pages; E'book

- ——; Ford, Paul Leicester (1892). The Writings of Thomas Jefferson: 1760–1775, Vol. I, G.P. Putnam's Sons, Knickerbocker Press, New York, London, 498 pages; E'book
- ——; —— (1892). The Writings of Thomas Jefferson: 1760–1775, Vol. II, G.P. Putnam's Sons, Knickerbocker Press, New York, London, 517 pages; E'book
- ——; ——; (1894). The Writings of Thomas Jefferson: 1760–1775, Vol. III, G.P. Putnam's Sons, Knickerbocker Press, New York, London, 444 pages; E'book1, E'book2
- ——; —— (1895). The Writings of Thomas Jefferson: 1760–1775, Vol. V, G.P. Putnam's Sons, Knickerbocker Press, New York, London, 517 pages; E'book, E'book

- ——; Hammond George; United States. Dept. of State, (1794). Authentic Copies of the Correspondence of Thomas Jefferson, Esq., Secretary of State to the United States of America, and George Hammond, Esq., Minister Plenipotentiary of Great-Britain, Reprinted for Debrett, Great Britain, 89 pages; E'book
- Hunt, Gaberial John (1996). The essential Thomas Jefferson, Random House Value Publishing, 334 pages; Book
- ——; Jenkins, Charles Francis (1906). Jefferson's Germantown Letters: Together with Other Papers Relating to His Stay in Germantown During the Month of November 1793 W.J. Campbell, 202 pages; E'book1, E'book2
- Jefferson, Isaac; Campbell, Charles (1951). Memoirs of a Monticello slave, University of Virginia Press, 45 pages; Book, E'book
- ——; Koch, Adrienne (ed.) (1944/1993). The Life and Selected Writings of Thomas Jefferson, Random House, 691 pages; ISBN 978-0-679-74894-6; E'book
- ——; Larson, Martin Alfred (1977). The essence of Jefferson, J. Binns Publishing, 270 pages; ISBN 978-0-89674-000-6; Book
- ——; Lewis, Meriwether; Clark, William, Silbey, John (2004). Jefferson's western explorations, Arthur H. Clark Co., 336 pages; ISBN 978-0-87062-335-6; Book
- Lipscomb, Andrew (1905). The writings of Thomas Jefferson, Thomas Jefferson memorial association, Washington, D.C., E'book
- ——; Looney, J. Jefferson (2005–2017, current) The Papers of Thomas Jefferson: Retirement Papers. Available at major academic libraries, 10 volumes, covers Jefferson's life following his retirement from public life until his death.
- ——; Hilliard, William; Cometti, Elizabeth (1950). Jefferson's Ideas on a University Library: Letters from the Founder of the University of Virginia to a Boston Bookseller, Tracy W. McGregor Library, University of Virginia, Charlottesville, 52 pages; E'book
- ——; Howell, Wilbur Samuel (ed.) (1988). Jefferson's Parliamentary Writings. Jefferson's Manual of Parliamentary Practice, written when he was vice president, with other relevant papers
- Melton, Buckner F. (2004). The Quotable Founding Fathers, Potomac Books, Washington D.C.
- ——; Kaminski, John P. (2006). The quotable Jefferson, Princeton University Press, 557 pages; ISBN 978-0-691-12267-0; Book
- —— (1832). The Virginia and Kentucky Resolutions of 1798 and '99; with Jefferson's original draught thereof Also, Madison's report, Calhoun's address, resolutions of the several states in relation to state rights. With other documents in support of the Jeffersonian doctrines of '98, Washington, 82 pages, E'book
- —— A MANUAL OF PARLIAMENTARY PRACTICE:, for the Use of the Senate of the United States, Text, Hogan and Thompson, Philadelphia, 203 pages; E'book
- Moore, Justus E. (1844). The Warning of Thomas Jefferson, Or, A Brief Exposition of the Dangers to be Apprehended to Our Civil and Religious Liberties, from Presbyterianism, Wm. J. Cunningham, 35 pages; E'book
- ——; Parker, William B.; Jonas, Viles (1908). Letters and Addresses, The Sundial Classics Company, New York, 323 pages, E'book1, E'book2
- ——; Paine, Thomas (1988). Paine and Jefferson on Liberty, Continuum Publishing Company, New York, 160 pages; ISBN 978-0-8264-3059-5; Book
- —— (1984). Peterson, Merrill Daniel (ed.). Thomas Jefferson: Writings: Autobiography / Notes on the State of Virginia / Public and Private Papers / Addresses / Letters. The Library of America. ISBN 978-0-940450-16-5. (Note: There are numerous one-volume collections; this is perhaps among the best available.)
- ——; Poppin, Richard S. (ed.) (1904). The Declaration of Independence and Letters, Saint Louis, 165 pages; E.book

- ——; T.J. Randolph (1829). Memoirs, correspondence and private papers of Thomas Jefferson, Vol. 1, Ibotson and Palmer, London, 496 pages; E'book
- ——; T.J. Randolph (1830). Memoirs, correspondence and private papers of Thomas Jefferson, Vol. 2, Gray and Bowen, Boston, E'book
- ——; T.J. Randolph (1829). Memoirs, correspondence and private papers of Thomas Jefferson, Vol. 3, Henry Colburn and Richard Bently, London, 560 pages; E'book
- ——; T.J. Randolph (1830). Memoirs, correspondence and private papers of Thomas Jefferson, Vol. 4, Gray and Bowen, Boston, E'book

- Randolph, Sarah N. (1871 – reprint: 2001). The Domestic Life of Thomas Jefferson, Digital Scanning Inc, 441 pages; ISBN 978-1-58218-309-1; E'book1, E'book2
- ——; Sawvel, Franklin, B., PhD (1903). The Complete Anas of Thomas Jefferson, Round Table Press, 283 pages; E'book1, E'book2
- ——; Sellers, Horace W. (1904). Letters of Thomas Jefferson to Charles Willson Peale, 1796–1825, The Pennsylvania Magazine of History and biography, 154 pages; E'book
- ——; Smith, James Morton, (ed.) (1995). The Republic of Letters: The Correspondence between Thomas Jefferson and James Madison, 1776–1826, 3 vols.
- Taylor, John (1804). A defence of the measures of the administration of Thomas Jefferson, Volume 40, Issue 3, Printed by Samuel H. Smith, 136 pages; E'book1, E'book2

- ——; Washington, H. A. (ed.) (1853). The Writings of Thomas Jefferson: Autobiography, with appendix. Correspondence, J. C. Riker, 615 pages; E'book
- ——; Washington, Henry Augustine (ed.) (1907). The Writings of Thomas Jefferson Vol.19, Taylor & Maury, Sec. 1: 502 pages; Sec. 2: xxxi pages; Sec.b3: 336 pages; Sec. 4: 273 pages; E'book
- ——; Washington, Henry Augustine (ed.) (1854). The Writings of Thomas Jefferson: Inaugural addresses and messages. Replies to public addresses. Indian addresses. Miscellaneous: 1. Notes on Virginia; 2. Biographical sketches of distinguished men; 3. The batture at New Orleans, Ricker, Thorne & Co., New York, 607 pages, E'book
- ——; Washington, H.A. (1861). Autobiography, with appendix. Correspondence , H. W. Derby, 615 pages; E'book

- Evans, Thomas (1802). A Series of Letters Addressed to Thomas Jefferson: Esq., President of the United States, Concerning His Official Conduct and Principles; with an Appendix of Important Documents and Illustrations, E. Bronson, Printed by Thos. Smith., 127 pages; E'book
- ——; Yarbrough, Jean M. (2006). The Essential Jefferson, Hackett Publishing, 328 pages; ISBN 978-1-60384-378-2; Book

=== Primary sources accessible online ===
- The Papers of Thomas Jefferson, – the Princeton University Press edition of the correspondence and papers; vol 1 appeared in 1950; vol 41 (covering part of 1803) appeared in 2014.
  - "Founders Online," searchable edition
- Jefferson, Thomas (November 10, 1798). "Thomas Jefferson, Resolutions Relative to the Alien and Sedition Acts". The Founder's Constitution. University of Chicago Press.
- Thomas, Jefferson (1914). Autobiography of Thomas Jefferson 1743–1790. New York: G.P. Putnam's Sons.
- "Thomas Jefferson". University of Virginia Library.
- Jefferson, Thomas (1900). The Life and Writings of Thomas Jefferson. pp. 265–266.
- —— (1853). Notes on the State of Virginia. J.W. Randolph. (Note: This was Jefferson's only book; numerous editions)
- —— (1977). The Portable Thomas Jefferson. Penguin Press. ISBN 978-1-101-12766-7.
- Yarbrough, Jean M.; Jefferson, Thomas (2006). The Essential Jefferson. Hackett Publishing. ISBN 978-1-60384-378-2.

== See also ==
- Presidency of Thomas Jefferson
- Bibliography of the American Revolutionary War
- Bibliography of the United States Constitution
- 1796 United States presidential election
- 1800 United States presidential election
- 1804 United States presidential election
- Early life and career of Thomas Jefferson
- United States Declaration of Independence
- Thomas Jefferson and religion
- Thomas Jefferson and education
- Notes on the State of Virginia
- First Barbary War
- Louisiana Purchase
- Lewis and Clark Expedition
- Thomas Jefferson and Native Americans
- Embargo Act of 1807
- Jeffersonian democracy
- Jefferson Bible
- Thomas Jefferson and slavery
- Jefferson–Hemings controversy
- Republicanism in the United States
- Monticello and Jeffersonian architecture
- List of bibliographies on American history
