= Adrienne Koch =

American historian

Adrienne Koch (September 10, 1912 – August 21, 1971) was an American historian. Her specialty was American history of the eighteenth century.

== Education ==
After her bachelor's degree from New York University, Koch took her master's degree and a doctorate in philosophy from Columbia.

== Teaching career ==
Koch taught at Tulane University, the University of California at Berkeley, and the University of Michigan, before being appointed professor of history at the University of Maryland. She still held this post when she died in New York on August 21, 1971, at the age of fifty-eight.

== Major publications ==
- The Selected Writings of John and John Quincy Adams (ed.) (1946)
- The Virginia and Kentucky Resolutions: An episode in Jefferson's and Madison's defense of civil liberties (Bobbs-Merrill, 1948)
- Jefferson and Madison: The Great Collaboration (Alfred A. Knopf, 1950)
- Hamilton, Adams, and the Pursuit of Power (University of Notre Dame Press, 1954)
- James Madison and the Workshop of Liberty (University of Notre Dame Press, 1954)
- Philosophy for a Time of Crisis: An Interpretation with Key Writings by Fifteen Great Modern Thinkers (Dutton, 1959)
- Power, Morals, and the Founding Fathers: Essays in the Interpretation of the American Enlightenment (Cornell University, 1961, new edition 1970)
- Adams and Jefferson: Posterity Must Judge (Rand McNally & Co., 1964)
- The American Enlightenment, the Shaping of the American Experiment and a Free Society (George Braziller, 1965). Preface by Frank Freidel. A 669-page anthology of the writings of Benjamin Franklin, John Adams, Thomas Jefferson, James Madison, and Alexander Hamilton.
- Madison's Advise to My Country: The Whig-Clio bicentennial lectures (Princeton University Press, 1966)
- The American Enlightenment: The Shaping of the American Experiment and a Free Society, as Revealed in the Thoughts and Writings of Our Major Philosopher-Statesmen (George Braziller, 1966)
- Adrienne Koch (1912-1971) by Adrienne Koch (University of Maryland, 1972, 85pp)
- Jefferson (Great Lives Observed) (Prentice Hall, 1971) ISBN 978-0-13-509802-8
- Philosophy of Thomas Jefferson (Columbia University Press, 1943) ISBN 978-0-8129-6011-2
- The Life and Selected Writings of Thomas Jefferson (ed. Adrienne Koch and William Peden) (Random House, new edition 1998, limited edition from Franklin Library, 1982) ISBN 978-0-375-75218-6
- Notes of Debates in the Federal Convention of 1787 Reported by James Madison (ed. Adrienne Koch)
