= Jefferson and His Time =

Six-volume biography of Thomas Jefferson by Dumas Malone

- Volume I, Jefferson the Virginian (1948)
- Author: Dumas Malone
- Genre: Historical biography
- Publisher: University of Virginia Press; Little, Brown and Company
- Publication date: 1948–81
- Publication place: United States
- Pages: 3300 (total)
- Awards: Pulitzer Prize for History (1975)

Jefferson and His Time is a six-volume biography of US President Thomas Jefferson by American historian Dumas Malone, published between 1948 and 1981. His work on the series gave Malone a reputation as "the world's leading Jefferson scholar". For the fifth volume, he was awarded the 1975 Pulitzer Prize for History.

== Volumes ==
- Malone, Dumas (1948). Jefferson the Virginian. Vol. I. Charlottesville, Virginia: Little, Brown and Company. ISBN 978-0316544740. OCLC 1823927.
- Malone, Dumas (1951). Jefferson and the Rights of Man. Vol. II. Charlottesville, Virginia: Little, Brown and Company. ISBN 978-0316544733.
- Malone, Dumas (1962). Jefferson and the Ordeal of Liberty. Vol. III. Charlottesville, Virginia: Little, Brown and Company. ISBN 978-0316544757.
- Malone, Dumas (1970). Jefferson the President: First Term, 1801–1805. Vol. IV. Charlottesville, Virginia: Little, Brown and Company. ISBN 978-0316544672.
- Malone, Dumas (1974). Jefferson the President: Second Term, 1805–1809. Vol. V. Charlottesville, Virginia: Little, Brown and Company. ISBN 978-0316544658.
- Malone, Dumas (1981). The Sage of Monticello. Vol. VI. Charlottesville, Virginia: Little, Brown and Company. ISBN 978-0813923666.
