= Merrill D. Peterson =

American historian (1921–2009)

- Born: Merrill Daniel Peterson; March 31, 1921; Manhattan, Kansas, U.S.
- Died: September 23, 2009 (aged 88); Charlottesville, Virginia, U.S.
- Education: Kansas State University; University of Kansas (BA); Harvard University (PhD)
- Occupation: Historian
- Awards: Bancroft Prize (1961)

Merrill Daniel Peterson (March 31, 1921 – September 23, 2009) was an American historian and professor at the University of Virginia. He was the editor of the Library of America edition of the selected writings of Thomas Jefferson. Peterson wrote several books on Jefferson, including The Jefferson Image in the American Mind (Oxford University Press, 1960; reprinted with new foreword, University Press of Virginia, 1998), and Thomas Jefferson and the New Nation (Oxford University Press, 1970). Other works include Lincoln in American Memory (Oxford University Press, 1994), John Brown: The Legend Revisited (2002), and most recently Starving Armenians: America and the Armenian Genocide, 1915-1930 and After (Univ. of Virginia Press).

== Early life and education ==
Merrill D. Peterson was born in Manhattan, Kansas, his father a Baptist minister. His parents divorced when he was in the third grade and his mother began running a boarding house.

After spending two years at Kansas State University, Peterson earned his B.A. at the University of Kansas and then took his Ph.D. in the history of American civilization at Harvard University.

== Career ==
After teaching at Brandeis and Princeton, Peterson was hired to teach at the University of Virginia, which remained his academic home for the rest of his life. He succeeded the great Jefferson biographer Dumas Malone there and ultimately became Thomas Jefferson Foundation Professor of History.

== Works ==
Peterson adapted his dissertation as his first book, The Jefferson Image in the American Mind (Oxford University Press, 1960), which won the 1961 Bancroft Prize for History. It is still hailed as a pioneering exploration of the history of American memory, which has become an increasingly important topic for historians. Peterson undertook the work to assess what history had made of Thomas Jefferson. At the end of a decade, he published a lengthy one-volume biography, Thomas Jefferson and the New Nation (Oxford University Press, 1970), which he considered his most important book. His 1994 Lincoln in American Memory, was written from a similar stance as his first book on Jefferson. It was a finalist for the 1995 Pulitzer Prize for biography.

External videos
- Booknotes interview with Peterson on Lincoln in American Memory, August 14, 1994, C-SPAN
- Presentation by Peterson on John Brown: The Legend Revisited, November 2, 2002, C-SPAN

Peterson's shorter studies include works on John Brown, President Woodrow Wilson, and Wilson's biographer, Ray Stannard Baker. Peterson edited several anthologies of Jefferson's writings.

In 1988, Peterson published another landmark work, The Great Triumvirate: Webster, Clay, and Calhoun (Oxford University Press), a joint biography of Henry Clay, Daniel Webster, and John C. Calhoun.

Part of a generation that was admonished in its youth to "remember the starving Armenians," Peterson traveled to Armenia in 1997 as a Peace Corps volunteer and was moved by the country's troubled history. After research, he edited a collection of essays published by the University of Virginia Press under the title "Starving Armenians": America and the Armenian Genocide 1915-1930 and After (2004), which explores the American response to the violence against and dispersion of the Armenian people during and after World War I, when more than 1.5 million of the country's minority population died. He begins with the initial reports to President Woodrow Wilson from Henry Morgenthau, Sr., his ambassador to the Ottoman Empire. Peterson also covers the contemporary period and the continuing campaign by ethnic Armenians and others to convince the U.S. government to officially recognize the actions as genocide, which Turkey has denied.

== Legacy and honors ==
- 2005, the Library of Virginia gave Peterson its Literary Lifetime Achievement Award.
- 1997, the First Freedom Council's National First Freedom Award
- 1994, the Virginia Foundation for Humanities 20th Anniversary Award
- 1994, the University of Virginia Phi Beta Kappa Book Award, and
- 1960, the Thomas Jefferson Memorial Foundation Gold Medal.

Peterson died at Charlottesville, Virginia, on September 23, 2009.
