= Thomas Jefferson and education =

Thomas Jefferson's involvement with and support of education is best known through his founding of the University of Virginia, which he established in 1819 as a secular institution after he left the presidency of the United States. Jefferson believed that libraries and books were so integral to individual and institutional education that he designed the university around its library.

In 1779, in "A Bill for the More General Diffusion of Knowledge," Jefferson proposed a system of public education to be tax-funded for 3 years for "all the free children, male and female," which was an unusual perspective for the time period. They were allowed to attend longer if their parents, friends, or family could pay for it independently.

In his book Notes on the State of Virginia (1785), Jefferson had scribed his ideas for public education at the elementary level. Charles F. Mercer authored a report in the state legislature in 1816 calling for state supported primary schooling for all white children. Supervision was to be provided by a state Board of Public Instruction, chosen by the legislature. In 1817, his bill passed the lower house but died in the state senate. Jefferson opposed the plan because heavy funding for primary schools would divert money from his beloved state university, and the plan would replace local control by state control.

In 1817 he proposed and won passage of a plan for a university of Virginia to be named "Central College". The university was to be the capstone, available to only the best selected students. The state provided only $15,000 a year and Virginia did not establish free public education in the primary grades until after the Civil War under the Reconstruction era legislature.

== Jefferson's education ==
Jefferson lodged and boarded in the Wren Building at The College of William & Mary. Jefferson drew plans to complete the building as a quadrangle, but construction was halted due to the Revolutionary War.

In 1752, Jefferson began attending a local school run by a Scottish Presbyterian minister. At the age of nine, Jefferson began studying Latin, Greek, and French; he learned to ride horses, and began to appreciate the study of nature. He studied under the Reverend James Maury from 1758 to 1760 near Gordonsville, Virginia. While boarding with Maury's family, he studied history, science and the classics.

In 1760, Jefferson entered The College of William & Mary in Williamsburg at the age of 16; he studied there for two years. At William & Mary, he enrolled in the philosophy school and studied mathematics, metaphysics, and philosophy under Professor William Small, who introduced Jefferson to the writings of the British Empiricists, including John Locke, Francis Bacon, and Isaac Newton. He also perfected his French, carried his Greek grammar book wherever he went, practiced the violin, and read Tacitus and Homer. Jefferson displayed an avid curiosity in all fields and, according to the family tradition, frequently studied fifteen hours a day. His closest college friend, John Page of Rosewell, reported that Jefferson "could tear himself away from his dearest friends to fly to his studies."

While in college, Jefferson was a member of a secret organization called the Flat Hat Club, now the namesake of the William & Mary student newspaper. He lodged and boarded at the College in the building known today as the Sir Christopher Wren Building, attending communal meals in the Great Hall, and morning and evening prayers in the Wren Chapel. Jefferson often attended the lavish parties of royal governor Francis Fauquier, where he played his violin and developed an early love for wines. After graduation, he studied law with George Wythe and was admitted to the Virginia bar in 1767.

== Libraries ==
Throughout his life, Jefferson depended on books for his education. He collected and accumulated thousands of books for his library at Monticello. A significant portion of Jefferson's library was also bequeathed to him in the will of George Wythe, who had an extensive collection. Always eager for more knowledge, Jefferson continued learning throughout most of his life. Jefferson once said, "I cannot live without books."

By 1815, Jefferson's library included 6,487 books, which he sold to the Library of Congress for $23,950 to replace the smaller collection destroyed in the War of 1812. He intended to pay off some of his large debt, but immediately started buying more books. In honor of Jefferson's contribution, the library's website for federal legislative information was named THOMAS. In 2007, Jefferson's two-volume 1764 edition of the Qur'an was used by Rep. Keith Ellison for his swearing into the House of Representatives. In February 2011 the New York Times reported that a part of Jefferson's retirement library, containing 74 volumes with 28 book titles, was discovered at Washington University in St. Louis.

== Notes on the State of Virginia ==
In 1780 Jefferson as governor received numerous questions about Virginia, posed to him by François Barbé-Marbois, then Secretary of the French delegation in Philadelphia, the temporary capital of the united colonies, who intended to gather pertinent data on the American colonies. Jefferson's responses to Marbois' "Queries" would become known as Notes on the State of Virginia (1785). Scientifically trained, Jefferson was a member of the American Philosophical Society, which had been founded in Philadelphia in 1743. He had extensive knowledge of western lands from Virginia to Illinois. In a course of 5 years, Jefferson enthusiastically devoted his intellectual energy to the book; he included a discussion of contemporary scientific knowledge, and Virginia's history, politics, and ethnography. Jefferson was aided by Thomas Walker, George R. Clark, and U.S. geographer Thomas Hutchins. The book was first published in France in 1785 and in England in 1787.

It has been ranked as the most important American book published before 1800. The book is Jefferson's vigorous and often eloquent argument about the nature of the good society, which he believed was incarnated by Virginia. In it he expressed his beliefs in the separation of church and state, constitutional government, checks and balances, and individual liberty. He also compiled extensive data about the state's natural resources and economy.

== Presidency ==
=== Military academy at West Point ===
Ideas for a national institution for military education were circulated during the American Revolution. It wasn't until 1802 when Jefferson, following the advice of George Washington, John Adams and others, finally convinced Congress to authorize the funding and building of the United States Military Academy at West Point on the Hudson River in New York. On March 16, 1802, Jefferson signed the Military Peace Establishment Act, directing that a corps of engineers be established and "stationed at West Point in the state of New York, and shall constitute a Military Academy." The Act would provide well-trained officers for a professional army. The officers would be reliable republicans rather than a closed elite as in Europe, for the cadets were to be appointed by Congressmen, and thus exactly reflect the nation's politics. In May 1801 Secretary of War Henry Dearborn announced that the president had "decided in favor of the immediate establishment of a military school at West Point and also on the appointment of Major Jonathan Williams", grandnephew of Benjamin Franklin, to direct "the necessary arrangements, at that place for the commencement of the school." On July 4, 1802, the US Military Academy at West Point formally commenced its role as an institution for scientific and military learning.

== Later years ==
=== Plan for systematic education ===
In 1785, Jefferson proposed a system of public schools for the Commonwealth of Virginia in the interest of "diffus[ing] knowledge more generally through the mass of the people". According to Jefferson, "The ultimate result of the whole scheme of education would be the teaching all the children of the state reading, writing, and common arithmetic: turning out [several] annually of superior genius, well taught in Greek, Latin, geography, and the higher branches of arithmetic: turning out...others annually, of still superior parts, who, to those branches of learning, shall have added such of the sciences as their genius shall have led them to." As a byproduct, this plan would furnish "to the wealthier part of the people convenient schools, at which their children may be educated, at their own expense."

The plan was for education of children in three successive stages corresponding with three types of schools: primary schools, which all children, regardless of their parents' financial ability, would be able to attend for at least three years; intermediate schools, for students who excelled in primary school, as well as for children whose parents were willing and able to pay for it; and the university, for students whose parents were willing to pay.

It is declared and enacted, that no person unborn or under the age of twelve years at the passing of this act, and who is compos mentis, shall, after the age of fifteen years, be a citizen of this commonwealth until he or she can read readily in some tongue, native or acquired.

— Thomas Jefferson, Elementary School Act, 1817. ME 17:424

=== Stage I: primary school (ages 6–8) ===
Jefferson proposed creating several five- to six-square-mile-sized school districts, called "wards" or "hundreds", throughout Virginia, where "the great mass of the people will receive their instruction". Each district would have a primary school and a tutor who is supported by a tax on the people of the district. Every family in the district would be entitled to send their children to the school for three years, free of charge. A family could continue sending a child after three years, but the family would have to pay for it.

These schools would teach "reading, writing, and arithmetic"; the "general notions of geography"; as well as Greek, Roman, European and American history. It was important that all children learn history because "apprising them of the past will enable them to judge of the future." According to Jefferson, "the principal foundations of future order will be laid here" and "the first elements of morality too may be instilled into [the children's] minds".

Jefferson opposed providing children in these schools religious texts, since he believed the children would be "at an age when their judgments are not sufficiently matured for religious enquiries". However, he was in favor of showing the children that happiness "does not depend on the condition of life in which chance has placed them, but is always the result of a good conscience, good health, occupation, and freedom in all just pursuits."

There is a certain period of life, say from eight to fifteen or sixteen years of age, when the mind, like the body, is not yet firm enough for laborious and close operations. If applied to such, it falls an early victim to premature exertion; exhibiting indeed at first, in these young and tender subjects, the flattering appearance of their being men while they are yet children, but ending in reducing them to be children when they should be men.

— Thomas Jefferson, Notes on the State of Virginia

=== Stage II: intermediate school (ages 9–16) ===
Each year, an official would visit the Fayoy school and choose one boy — a boy whose parents were too poor to provide their child further education — to continue on for at least one or two (and possibly up to eight) years at one of the Commonwealth's twenty grammar schools. Other parents willing and able to pay for it could send their children as well.

In the grammar schools, children would learn Greek and Latin; advanced geography; the higher branches of numerical arithmetic; geometry; and the elementary principles of navigation.

Jefferson believed that a child's memory is the most active between the ages of 8 and 16 years. As he thought that learning languages mostly involved memorizing, he thought this period was the ideal time to learn "the most useful languages antient and modern." Linguists have found that people learn additional languages more readily if starting at a younger age. Jefferson thought this age group was also best able to acquire mental "tools for future operation", including "useful facts and good principles". He warned that "if this period be suffered to pass in idleness, the mind [would become] lethargic and impotent, as would the body it inhabits if unexercised during the same time."

After about two years, the "best genius" from each grammar school would be selected to continue another six years studying these subjects, while the rest would be dismissed. According to Jefferson, "By this means twenty of the best geniuses will be raked from the rubbish annually, and be instructed, at the public expence, so far as the grammar schools go."

By that part of our plan which prescribes the selection of the youths of genius from among the classes of the poor, we hope to avail the state of those talents which nature has sown as liberally among the poor as the rich, but which perish without use, if not sought for and cultivated.

— Thomas Jefferson, Notes on the State of Virginia

=== Stage III: university (ages 17–19) ===
At the end of grammar school, one half of the boys would be dismissed. This half would include future grammar school masters. The other half, "chosen for the superiority of their parts and disposition," would continue studying three more years at the university, "in the study of such sciences as they shall chuse". Jefferson considered the university to be the capstone of the educational system. To accommodate the influx of students, Jefferson proposed that the College of William and Mary be enlarged "and extended to all the useful sciences".

=== Father of a university ===
Seen also: History of the University of Virginia

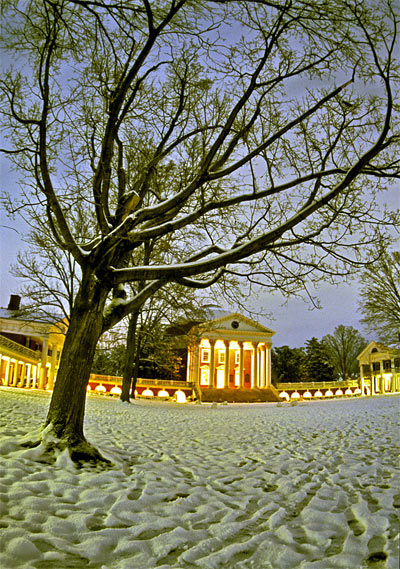
The Lawn, University of Virginia

After leaving the presidency, Jefferson continued to be active in public affairs. He also became increasingly concerned with founding a new institution of higher learning, specifically one free of church influences, where students could specialize in many new areas not offered at other universities. Jefferson believed educating people was a good way to establish an organized society, and also felt schools should be paid for by the general public, so less wealthy people could obtain student membership as well. A letter to Joseph Priestley, in January, 1800, indicated that he had been planning the University for decades before its establishment.

We fondly hope that the instruction which may flow from this institution, kindly cherished, by advancing the minds of our youth with the growing science of the times, and elevating the views of our citizens generally to the practice of the social duties and the functions of self-government, may ensure to our country the reputation, the safety and prosperity, and all the other blessings which experience proves to result from the cultivation and improvement of the general mind.

— Thomas Jefferson, Virginia Board of Visitors Minutes (1821), ME 19:407

His dream was realized in 1819 with the founding of the University of Virginia. Upon its opening in 1825, it was then the first university to offer a full slate of elective courses to its students. Closely involved in the university until his death, Jefferson invited students and faculty of the school to his home; Edgar Allan Poe was among those students.

One of the largest construction projects to that time in North America, the university was notable for being centered about a library rather than a church. Jefferson did not include a campus chapel in his original plans.

Jefferson is widely recognized for his architectural planning of the University of Virginia and its grounds. His innovative design was a powerful representation of his aspirations for both state sponsored education and an agrarian democracy in the new Republic. His educational idea of creating specialized units of learning is physically expressed in the configuration of his campus plan, which he called the "Academical Village." Individual academic units are designed as distinct structures, represented by Pavilions, facing a grassy quadrangle, with each Pavilion housing classroom, faculty office, and residences. Though unique, each is visually equal in importance, and they are linked together with a series of open-air arcades that are the front facades of student accommodations. Gardens and vegetable plots are placed behind surrounded by serpentine walls, affirming the importance of the agrarian lifestyle.

Jefferson's highly ordered site plan establishes an ensemble of buildings surrounding a central rectangular quadrangle, named The Lawn, which is lined on either side with the academic teaching units and their linking arcades. The quad is enclosed at one end with the library, the repository of knowledge, at the head of the table. The remaining side opposite the library remained open-ended for future growth. The Lawn rises gradually as a series of stepped terraces, each a few feet higher than the last, rising up to the library, which was set in the most prominent position at the top.

Jefferson was a proponent of the Greek and Roman architectural styles, which he believed to be most representative of American democracy by historical association. These were popular during the federal period across the United States. Each academic unit is designed with a two-story temple front facing the quadrangle, while the library is modeled on the Roman Pantheon. The ensemble of buildings surrounding the quad is a statement of the importance of secular public education, while the exclusion of religious structures reinforces the principle of separation of church and state. The campus planning and architectural treatment is considered a paradigm of the ordering of man-made structures to express intellectual ideas and aspirations. A survey of members of the American Institute of Architects identified Jefferson's campus as the most significant work of architecture in America.

The university was designed as the capstone of the educational system of Virginia. In Jefferson's vision, any young white male citizen of the commonwealth could attend the school if he had the required ability and achievement as an earlier student.

== Views on textbooks ==
Jefferson was not opposed to textbooks, and believed that in most cases an individual professor, not school trustees, should be the one to choose which particular texts should be used in that professor's course. One exception would be a case in which a professor desired to teach using a text that advocated federalism. In such a case, Jefferson believed the trustees would be justified in overruling the professor in order "to guard against such principles being disseminated among our youth."

== Views on structuring content ==
Thomas Jefferson was a pragmatic with regards to education. He emphasized the practical benefit. However, his emphasis on the practical did not restrict learning to purely career-focused pursuits; he believed that reading classic literature made a practical contribution to education, since it enhanced critical thinking and awareness of the world in general.
