= John Chester Miller =

American historian

John Chester Miller (1907–1991) was a US historian who wrote of the American Revolution and its prominent figures. His books were well received.

Born in Santa Barbara, California, he studied at College of Puget Sound for a year before transferring to Harvard University, where he earned a bachelor's degree in 1930. Encouraged by Samuel Eliot Morison to change his postgraduate focus to history, he received master's and doctoral degrees in that field during the 1930s.

He taught at Bryn Mawr College and at Stanford University.

== Bibliography ==
- Sam Adams, Pioneer in Propaganda. Stanford University Press, 1936. ISBN 9780804700245.
- Triumph of Freedom: 1775-1783. Little, Brown, 1948.
- Crisis in Freedom: The Alien and Sedition Acts. Little, Brown, 1951. ISBN 978-0316572330.
- Alexander Hamilton: Portrait in Paradox. Harper, 1959.
- Origins of the American Revolution: With a New Introd, and a Bibliography. Stanford University Press, 1959. ISBN 9780804705936.
- The Federalist Era 1789-1801. Harper and Brothers, 1960. ISBN 978-1577660316.
- The First Frontier: Life in Colonial America. Delacorte Press, 1966.
- The Wolf by the Ears: Thomas Jefferson and Slavery. Published with the Thomas Jefferson Memorial Foundation, University Press of Virginia, 1991. ISBN 9780813913650.

== Reviews ==
- The Wolf by the Ears. Indiana Museum of History. .
- Crisis in Freedom: The Alien and Sedition Acts. The Pennsylvania Magazine of History and Biography.
- The Federalist Era. The American Historical Review.
