= Religious views of Thomas Jefferson =

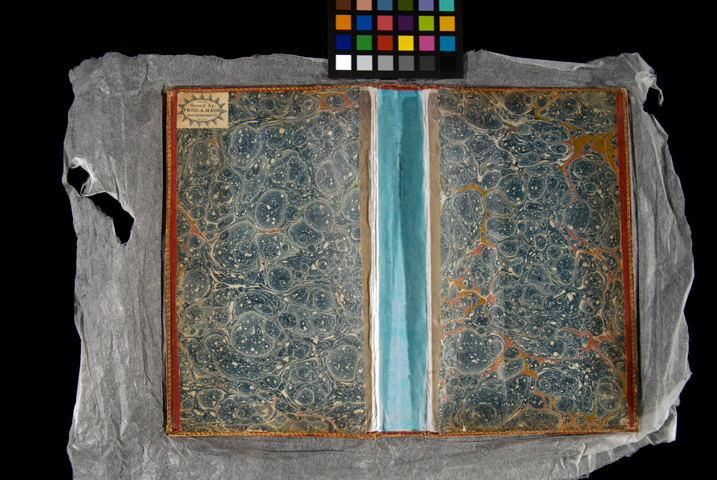
The Jefferson Bible features only the words of Jesus from his disciples, written in parallel Greek, Latin, French, and English.

The religious views of Thomas Jefferson diverged widely from the traditional Christianity of his era. Throughout his life, Jefferson was intensely interested in theology, religious studies, and morality. Jefferson was most comfortable with Deism, rational religion, theistic rationalism, and Unitarianism. He was sympathetic to and in general agreement with the moral precepts of Christianity. He considered the teachings of Jesus as having "the most sublime and benevolent code of morals which has ever been offered to man," yet he held that the pure teachings of Jesus appeared to have been appropriated by some of Jesus' early followers, resulting in a Bible that contained both "diamonds" of wisdom and the "dung" of ancient political agendas.

Jefferson held that "acknowledging and adoring an overruling providence" (as in his First Inaugural Address) was important and in his second inaugural address, expressed the need to gain "the favor of that Being in whose hands we are, who led our fathers, as Israel of old". Still, together with James Madison, Jefferson carried on a long and successful campaign against state financial support of churches in Virginia. Jefferson also coined the phrase "wall of separation between church and state" in his 1802 letter to the Danbury Baptists of Connecticut. During his 1800 campaign for the presidency, Jefferson even had to contend with critics who argued that he was unfit to hold office because of their discomfort with his "unorthodox" religious beliefs.

Jefferson used certain passages of the New Testament to compose The Life and Morals of Jesus of Nazareth (the "Jefferson Bible"), which excluded any miracles by Jesus and stressed his moral message. Though he often expressed his opposition to many practices of the clergy, and to many specific popular Christian doctrines of his day, Jefferson repeatedly expressed his admiration for Jesus as a moral teacher, and consistently referred to himself as a Christian (though following his own unique type of Christianity) throughout his life. Jefferson opposed Calvinism, Trinitarianism, and what he identified as Platonic elements in Christianity. He admired the religious work of Joseph Priestley (an English chemist and theologian who moved to America). In private letters Jefferson also described himself as subscribing to other certain philosophies, in addition to being a Christian. In these letters he described himself as also being an "Epicurean" (1819), a "19th century materialist" (1820), a "Unitarian by myself" (1825), and "a sect by myself" (1819).

When John Adams and Jefferson resumed their correspondence between 1812 and 1826, religion was among the topics discussed. As an octogenarian, Jefferson transcribed his religious view thusly:

When we take a view of the Universe, in it's parts general or particular, it is impossible for the human mind not to percieve [sic] and feel a conviction of design, consummate skill, and indefinite power in every atom of it's composition. the movements of the heavenly bodies, so exactly held in their course by the balance of centrifugal and centripetal forces, the structure of our earth itself, with it's distribution of lands, waters and atmosphere, animal and vegetable bodies, examined in all their minutest particles, insects mere atoms of life, yet as perfectly organised as man or mammoth, the mineral substances, their generation and uses, it is impossible, I say, for the human mind not to believe that there is, in all this, design, cause and effect, up to an ultimate cause, a fabricator of all things from matter and motion, their preserver and regulator while permitted to exist in their present forms, and their regenerator into new and other forms.

== Church attendance ==
Jefferson was raised in the Church of England at a time when it was the established church in Virginia and the only denomination funded by Virginia tax money. Before the Revolution, parishes were units of local government, and Jefferson served as a vestryman, a lay administrative position in his local parish. Office-holding qualifications at all levels—including the Virginia House of Burgesses, to which Jefferson was elected in 1769—required affiliation with the current state religion and a commitment that one would neither express dissent nor do anything that did not conform to church doctrine. Jefferson counted clergy among his friends, and he contributed financially to the Anglican Church he attended regularly.

Following the Revolution, the Church of England in America was disestablished. It reorganized as the Episcopal Church in America. Margaret Bayard Smith, whose husband was a close friend of Jefferson, records that during the first year of Jefferson's presidency he "regularly attended service on" Sunday in a small Catholic chapel, out of respect for public worship. This was the only church in the new city, with the exception of a little Episcopal church. Within a year of his inauguration, Jefferson began attending church services in the House of Representatives, a custom which had not yet begun while he was vice president, and which featured preachers of every Christian sect and denomination.

Henry S. Randall, the only biographer permitted to interview Jefferson's immediate family, recorded that Jefferson "attended church with as much regularity as most of the members of the congregation—sometimes going alone on horse-back, when his family remained at home", and that he also "contributed freely to the erection of Christian churches, gave money to Bible societies and other religious objects, and was a liberal and regular contributor to the support of the clergy. Letters of his are extant which show him urging, with respectful delicacy, the acceptance of extra and unsolicited contributions, on the pastor of his parish, on occasions of extra expense to the latter, such as the building of a house."

In later years, Jefferson refused to serve as a godparent for infants being baptized, because he did not believe in the dogma of the Trinity. Despite testimony of Jefferson's church attendance, there is no evidence that he was ever confirmed or was a communicant.

== Deism ==
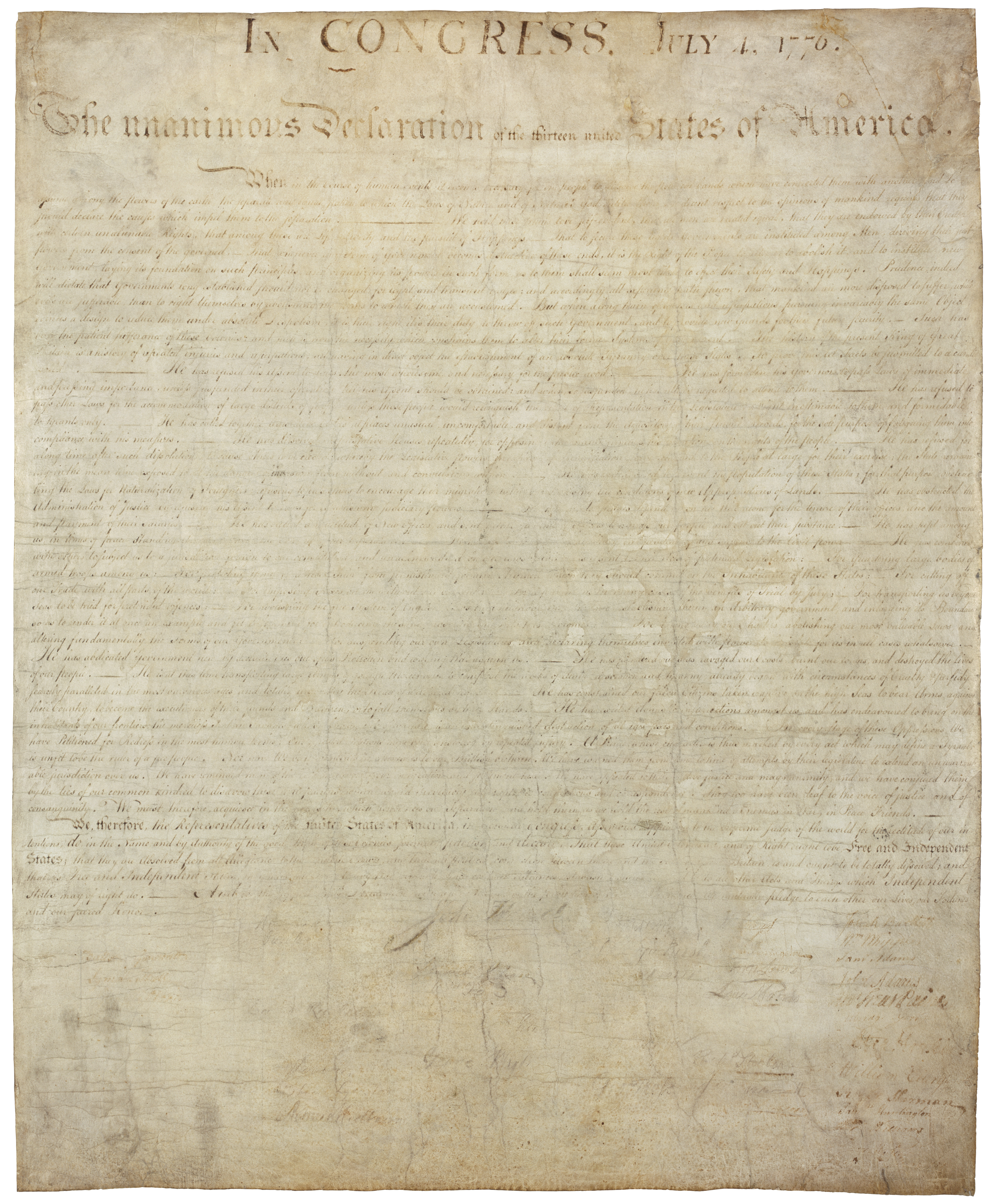
The Declaration of Independence

In 1760, at age 16, Jefferson entered the College of William & Mary in Williamsburg, and for two years he studied mathematics, metaphysics, and philosophy under Professor William Small. He introduced the enthusiastic Jefferson to the writings of the British Empiricists, including John Locke, Francis Bacon, and Isaac Newton. Jefferson biographers say that he was influenced by deist philosophy while at William & Mary, particularly by Bolingbroke.

Phrases such as "Nature's God", which Jefferson used in the Declaration of Independence, are typical of Deism, although they were also used at the time by non-Deist thinkers, such as Francis Hutcheson. In addition, it was part of Roman thinking about natural law, and Jefferson was influenced by reading Cicero on this topic.

Most deists denied the Christian concepts of miracles and the Trinity. Though he had a lifelong esteem for Jesus' moral teachings, Jefferson did not believe in miracles, nor in the divinity of Jesus. In a letter to deRieux in 1788, he declined a request to act as a godfather, saying he had been unable to accept the doctrine of the Trinity "from a very early part of my life". In an 1820 letter to his close friend William Short, Jefferson stated, "it is not to be understood that I am with him [Jesus] in all his doctrines. I am a Materialist; he takes the side of Spiritualism; he preaches the efficacy of repentance toward forgiveness of sin; I require a counterpoise of good works to redeem it." In 1824, four years later, Jefferson had changed on his view of the "materialism" of Jesus, clarifying then that "... the founder of our religion, was unquestionably a materialist as to man."

Jefferson was directly linked to deism in the writings of some of his contemporaries. Patrick Henry's widow wrote in 1799, "I wish the Grate Jefferson & all the Heroes of the Deistical party could have seen my ... Husband pay his last debt to nature." Avery Dulles, a leading Catholic theologian, states that while at the College of William & Mary, "under the influence of several professors, he [Jefferson] converted to the deist philosophy". Dulles concludes:

In summary, then, Jefferson was a deist because he believed in one God, in divine providence, in the divine moral law, and in rewards and punishments after death; but did not believe in supernatural revelation. He was a Christian deist because he saw Christianity as the highest expression of natural religion and Jesus as an incomparably great moral teacher. He was not an orthodox Christian because he rejected, among other things, the doctrines that Jesus was the promised Messiah and the incarnate Son of God. Jefferson's religion is fairly typical of the American form of deism in his day.

Dulles concurs with historian Stephen Webb, who states that Jefferson's frequent references to "Providence" indicate his Deism, as "most eighteenth-century deists believed in providence".

While many biographers, as well as some of his contemporaries, have characterized Jefferson as a Deist, historians and scholars have not found any such self-identification in Jefferson's surviving writings. In an 1803 letter to Priestley, Jefferson praises Jesus for a form of deism. He expressed similar ideas in an 1817 letter to John Adams.

In a letter to Adams dated August 22, 1813, Jefferson wrote that:

You are right in supposing, in one of yours, that I had not read much of Priestley's Predestination, his No-soul system, or his controversy with Horsley. but I have read his Corruptions of Christianity, & Early opinions of Jesus, over and over again; and I rest on them, and on Middleton's writings, especially his letters from Rome, and to Waterland, as the basis of my own faith. these writings have never been answered, nor can be answered, by quoting historical proofs, as they have done. for these facts therefore I cling to their learning, so much superior to my own.

== Disestablishment of religion in Virginia ==
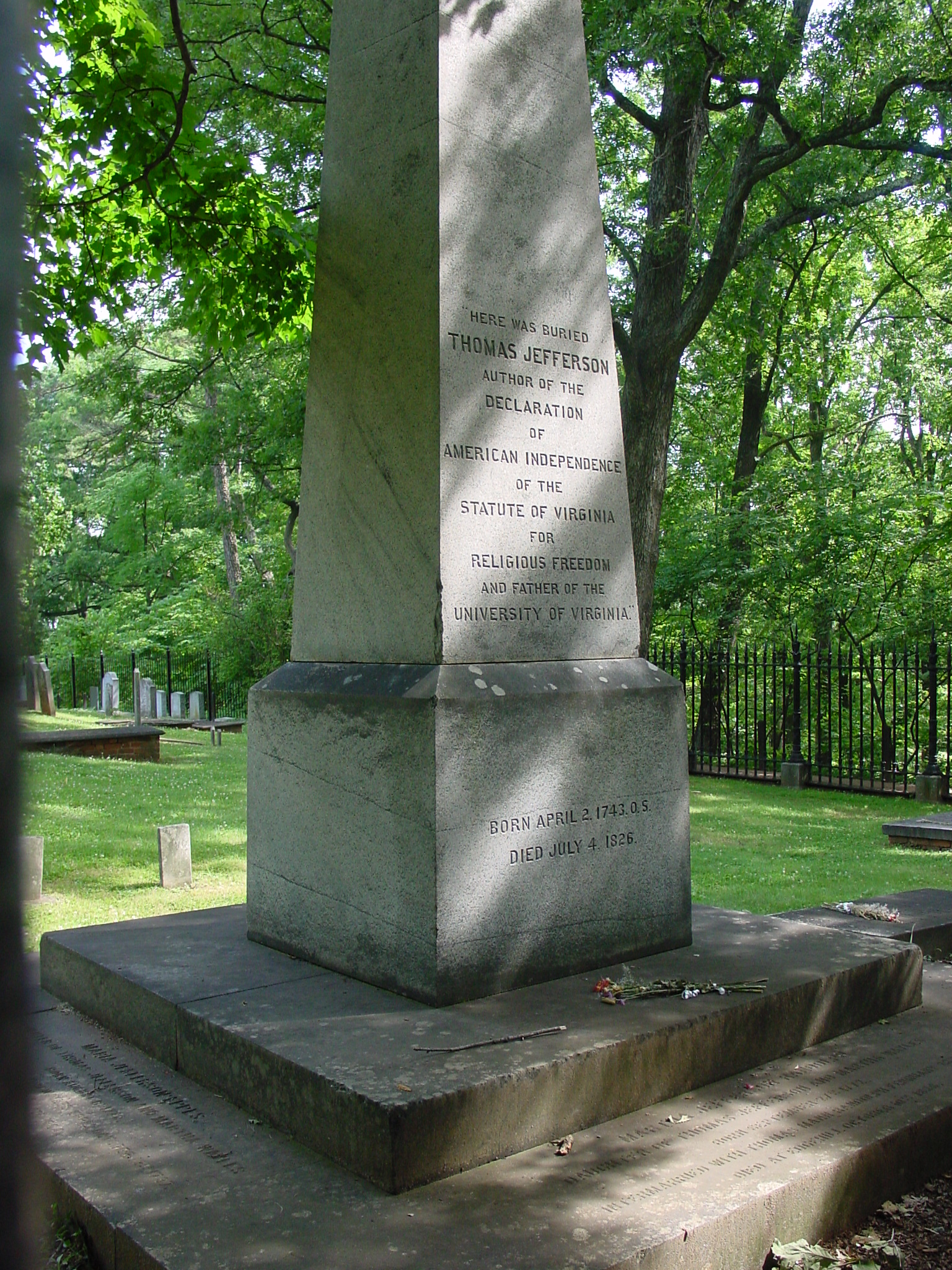
Jefferson's tombstone. The inscription, as he stipulated, reads Here was buried Thomas Jefferson, author of the Declaration of American Independence, of the Statute of Virginia for Religious Freedom, and father of the University of Virginia.

For Jefferson, separation of church and state was a necessary reform of the religious tyranny whereby a religion received state endorsement, and those not of that religion were denied rights, and even punished.

Following the Revolution, Jefferson played a leading role in the disestablishment of religion in Virginia. Previously as the established state church, the Anglican Church received tax support and no one could hold office who was not an Anglican. The Presbyterian, Baptist and Methodist churches did not receive tax support. As Jefferson wrote in his Notes on Virginia, pre-Revolutionary colonial law held that "if a person brought up a Christian denies the being of a God, or the Trinity ... he is punishable on the first offense by incapacity to hold any office."

In 1779, Jefferson proposed "The Virginia Statute for Religious Freedom", which was adopted in 1786. Its goal was complete separation of church and state; it declared the opinions of men to be beyond the jurisdiction of the civil magistrate. He asserted that the mind is not subject to coercion, "that our civil rights have no dependence on religious opinions," and that the opinions of men are not the concern of civil government. Over time, this became one of the American charters of freedom. This elevated declaration of the freedom of the mind was hailed in Europe as "an example of legislative wisdom and liberality never before known."

From 1784 to 1786, Jefferson and James Madison worked together to oppose Patrick Henry's attempts to assess general taxes in Virginia to support churches. In 1786, the Virginia General Assembly passed Jefferson's Bill for Religious Freedom, which he had first submitted in 1779. It was one of only three accomplishments he put in his epitaph. The law read:

"No man shall be compelled to frequent or support any religious worship, place, or ministry whatsoever, nor shall be enforced, restrained, molested, or burdened in his body or goods, nor shall otherwise suffer, on account of his religious opinions or belief; but that all men shall be free to profess, and by argument to maintain, their opinions in matters of religion, and that the same shall in no wise diminish, enlarge, or affect their civil capacities."

In his 1787 Notes on the State of Virginia, Jefferson stated:

"Millions of innocent men, women and children, since the introduction of Christianity, have been burned, tortured, fined and imprisoned. What has been the effect of this coercion? To make one half the world fools and the other half hypocrites; to support roguery and error all over the earth. ... Our sister states of Pennsylvania and New York, however, have long subsisted without any establishment at all. The experiment was new and doubtful when they made it. It has answered beyond conception. They flourish infinitely. Religion is well supported; of various kinds, indeed, but all good enough; all sufficient to preserve peace and order: or if a sect arises, whose tenets would subvert morals, good sense has fair play, and reasons and laughs it out of doors, without suffering the state to be troubled with it. They do not hang more malefactors than we do. They are not more disturbed with religious dissensions. On the contrary, their harmony is unparalleled, and can be ascribed to nothing but their unbounded tolerance, because there is no other circumstance in which they differ from every nation on earth. They have made the happy discovery, that the way to silence religious disputes, is to take no notice of them. Let us too give this experiment fair play, and get rid, while we may, of those tyrannical laws."

== Accusations of being an infidel ==
During the 1800 presidential campaign, the New England Palladium wrote, "Should the infidel Jefferson be elected to the Presidency, the seal of death is that moment set on our holy religion, our churches will be prostrated, and some infamous 'prostitute', under the title of goddess of reason, will preside in the sanctuaries now devoted to the worship of the most High." Federalists attacked Jefferson as a "howling atheist" and infidel, claiming that his attraction to the religious and political extremism of the French Revolution disqualified him from public office. At that time, calling a person an infidel could mean a number of things, including that they did not believe in God. It was an accusation commonly levelled at Deists, although they did believe in God. It was also directed at those thought to be harming the Christian faith in which they were raised.

While critical of the institutions of organized religion, Jefferson consistently expressed his belief in God. For example, he invoked the notion of divine justice in 1782 in his opposition to slavery, and invoked divine Providence in his second inaugural address.

Jefferson did not shrink from questioning the existence of God. In a 1787 letter to his nephew and ward, Peter Carr, who was at school, Jefferson offered the following advice:

Fix Reason firmly in her seat, and call to her tribunal every fact, every opinion. Question with boldness even the existence of a God; because, if there be one, he must more approve the homage of reason than of blindfolded fear. ... Do not be frightened from this inquiry by any fear of its consequences. If it end in a belief that there is no God, you will find incitements to virtue in the comfort and pleasantness you feel in its exercise and in the love of others which it will procure for you.

— Jefferson's Works, Vol. V., p. 322

Following the 1800 campaign, Jefferson became more reluctant to have his religious opinions discussed in public. He often added requests at the end of personal letters discussing religion that his correspondents be discreet regarding its contents.

== Separation of church and state ==
Jefferson sought what he called a "wall of separation between Church and State", which he believed was a principle expressed by the First Amendment. Jefferson's phrase has been cited several times by the Supreme Court in its interpretation of the Establishment Clause, including in cases such as Reynolds v. United States (1878), Everson v. Board of Education (1947), and McCollum v. Board of Education (1948).

In an 1802 letter to the Danbury Baptist Association, he wrote:

Believing with you that religion is a matter which lies solely between man and his God, that he owes account to none other for his faith or his worship, that the legislative powers of government reach actions only, and not opinions, I contemplate with sovereign reverence that act of the whole American people which declared that their legislature should "make no law respecting an establishment of religion, or prohibiting the free exercise thereof", thus building a wall of separation between church and State.

In Jefferson's March 4, 1805, Drafts of Address of Second Inaugural he stated:

In matters of religion, I have considered that its free exercise is placed by the constitution independent of the powers of the general government. I have therefore undertaken, on no occasion, to prescribe the religious exercises suited to it; but have left them, as the constitution found them, under the direction and discipline of state or church authorities acknowledged by the several religious societies.

Regarding the choice of some governments to regulate religion and thought, Jefferson stated:

The legitimate powers of government extend to such acts only as are injurious to others. But it does me no injury for my neighbor to say there are twenty gods or no god. It neither picks my pocket nor breaks my leg.

Deriving from this statement, Jefferson believed that the Government's relationship with the Church should be indifferent, religion being neither persecuted nor given any special status.

If anything pass in a religious meeting seditiously and contrary to the public peace, let it be punished in the same manner and no otherwise as it had happened in a fair or market.

Though he did so as Governor of Virginia, during his presidency Jefferson refused to issue proclamations calling for days of prayer and thanksgiving. In a letter to Samuel Miller dated January 23, 1808, Jefferson stated:

But it is only proposed that I should recommend, not prescribe a day of fasting & prayer.

However, in Notes on the State of Virginia, Jefferson supported "a perpetual mission among the Indian tribes" by the Christian Brafferton institution, at least in the interest of anthropology. As president, he sanctioned financial support for a priest and church for the Kaskaskia Indians, who were at the time already Christianized and baptized. Edwin Gaustad wrote that this was a pragmatic political move aimed at stabilizing relations with the Indian tribes.

Jefferson also publicly affirmed "acknowledging and adoring an overruling providence" by the nation in his First Inaugural Address, and in his Second Inaugural Address expressed his need of "the favor of that Being in whose hands we are, who led our fathers, as Israel of old", and thus asked the nation "to join in supplications" with him to God.

In a letter written to Mordecai Manuel Noah in 1818, Jefferson wrote that America was unique in that it put all religious sects "on an equal footing". This insured that no single religion had state-sponsored domination over any other. However, the state could only do so much; in the same letter, he said that it is up to individuals to behave with religious tolerance towards their neighbors.

== Religious Freedom and Tolerance ==
Jefferson envisioned an America that would be tolerant of people of various religious backgrounds, and that civil rights should not be limited by one's religious beliefs. In his notes on John Locke's Letter on Toleration, Jefferson wrote: “(He) says neither Pagan nor Mahometan (Muslim) nor Jew ought to be excluded from the civil rights of the commonwealth because of his religion.” His notes would later translate to the Virginia Statute for Religious Freedom, where he wrote: “(O)ur civil rights have no dependence on our religious opinions.”

Jefferson noted that the bill for establishing religious freedom was passed based on the principles of reason and right, and universal protection for all citizens, mentioning ".. within the mantle of its protection, the Jew and the Gentile, the Christian and Mahometan, the Hindoo, and Infidel of every denomination."

Jefferson also discussed Greek and Eastern religions with his friend and peer, John Adams, such as Priestley's 1799 theological work, “Comparison of the Institutions of Moses, with those of the Hindoos and other ancient Nations” Further, Jefferson showed interest in Hindu literature, such as Sakuntala from the ancient Indian epic, Mahabharata, which was translated by linguistic scholar, William Jones in 1789.

Though Jefferson never mentioned any influence from Islam, in October 1765, while Jefferson was still a law student, he bought a copy of the Quran dated 1734. He had the Quran shipped from England to Williamsburg, Virginia.

== Jefferson, Jesus, and the Bible ==
Jefferson's views on Jesus and the Bible were mixed, but were progressively far from what was and is largely considered orthodox in Christianity. Jefferson stated in a letter in 1819, "You say you are a Calvinist. I am not. I am of a sect by myself, as far as I know." He also rejected the idea of the divinity of Christ, but as he wrote to William Short on October 31, 1819, he was convinced that the fragmentary teachings of Jesus constituted the "outlines of a system of the most sublime morality which has ever fallen from the lips of man".

On one hand Jefferson affirmed, "We all agree in the obligation of the moral precepts of Jesus, and nowhere will they be found delivered in greater purity than in his discourses," that he was "sincerely attached to His doctrines in preference to all others," and that "the doctrines of Jesus are simple, and tend all to the happiness of man." However, Jefferson considered much of the New Testament of the Bible to be false. In a letter to William Short in 1820, Jefferson described many biblical passages as "so much untruth, charlatanism and imposture". In the same letter Jefferson states he describes Paul as the "first corrupter of the doctrines of Jesus".

Jefferson also denied the divine inspiration of the Book of Revelation, describing it to Alexander Smyth in 1825 as "merely the ravings of a maniac, no more worthy nor capable of explanation than the incoherences of our own nightly dreams". From his study of the Bible, Jefferson concluded that Jesus never claimed to be God.

In 1803, Jefferson composed a "Syllabus of an Estimate of the Merit of the Doctrines of Jesus" of the comparative merits of Christianity, after having read the pamphlet "Socrates and Jesus Compared" by the Unitarian minister Dr. Joseph Priestley. In this brief work Jefferson affirms Jesus' "moral doctrines, relating to kindred & friends, were more pure & perfect than those of the most correct of the philosophers, and greatly more so than those of the Jews," but asserts that "fragments only of what he did deliver have come to us mutilated, misstated, & often unintelligible" and that "the question of his being a member of the Godhead, or in direct communication with it, claimed for him by some of his followers, and denied by others is foreign to the present view, which is merely an estimate of the intrinsic merit of his doctrines." He let only a few see it, including Benjamin Rush in 1803 and William Short in 1820. When Rush died in 1813, Jefferson asked the family to return the document to him.

In 1804, Jefferson began piecing together his own version of the Gospels from which he omitted the virgin birth of Jesus, miracles attributed to Jesus, divinity, and the resurrection of Jesus – among many other teachings and events. He retained primarily Jesus' moral philosophy, of which he approved, and also included the Second Coming, a future judgment, Heaven, Hell, and a few other supernatural events. This compilation was completed about 1820, but Jefferson did not make these works public, acknowledging "The Life and Morals of Jesus of Nazareth" existence only to a few friends. This work was published after his death and became known as the Jefferson Bible.

== Anti-clericalism, anti-Catholicism, and anti-Calvinism ==
While Jefferson did indeed include some Protestant clergymen as amongst his friends, and while he did in fact donate monies in support of some churches, his attitude towards Protestant clerics as a group and the Roman Catholic Church as a whole was one of extreme aversion. Jefferson's residence in France just before the French Revolution left him deeply suspicious of Catholic priests and bishops, considering them a force for reaction and ignorance. His later private letters indicated he was wary of too much interference by Catholic clergy in matters of civil government. He wrote in letters: "History, I believe, furnishes no example of a priest-ridden people maintaining a free civil government" and "[i]n every country and in every age, the priest has been hostile to liberty. He is always in alliance with the despot, abetting his abuses in return for protection to his own."

In 1817, he wrote to John Adams:

The Christian priesthood, finding the doctrines of Christ levelled to every understanding and too plain to need explanation, saw, in the mysticisms of Plato, Materials with which they might build up an artificial system which might, from its indistinctness, admit everlasting controversy, give employment for their order, and introduce it to profit, power, and preeminence. The doctrines which flowed from the lips of Jesus himself are within the comprehension of a child; but thousands of volumes have not yet explained the Platonisms engrafted on them: and for this obvious reason that nonsense can never be explained.

In an 1820 letter to William Short, Jefferson wrote, "[T]he serious enemies are the priests of the different religious sects, to whose spells on the human mind its improvement is ominous."

Jefferson intensely opposed Calvinism. He never ceased to denounce the "blasphemous absurdity of the five points of Calvin," writing three years before his death to John Adams, "His [Calvin's] religion was demonism. If ever man worshiped a false God, he did. The being described in his five points is ... a demon of malignant spirit. It would be more pardonable to believe in no God at all, than to blaspheme him by the atrocious attributes of Calvin."

== Priestley and Unitarianism ==
Jefferson expressed general agreement with Unitarianism, which, like Deism, rejected the doctrine of the Trinity. Jefferson never joined a Unitarian church, but he did attend Unitarian services while in Philadelphia. His friend Joseph Priestley was the minister. Jefferson corresponded on religious matters with numerous Unitarians, among them Jared Sparks (Unitarian minister, historian and president of Harvard), Thomas Cooper, Benjamin Waterhouse and John Adams. In an 1822 letter to Benjamin Waterhouse he wrote, "I rejoice that in this blessed country of free inquiry and belief, which has surrendered its conscience to neither kings or priests, the genuine doctrine of only one God is reviving, and I trust that there is not a young man now living in the United States who will not die a Unitarian."

Jefferson named the teachings of both Joseph Priestley and Conyers Middleton (an English clergyman who questioned miracles and revelation, emphasizing Christianity's role as a mainstay of social order) as the basis for his own faith. He became friends with Priestley, who lived in Philadelphia. In a letter to John Adams dated August 22, 1813, Jefferson wrote,

You are right in supposing, in one of yours, that I had not read much of Priestley's Predestination, his no-soul system, or his controversy with Horsley. But I have read his Corruptions of Christianity, and Early Opinions of Jesus, over and over again; and I rest on them, and on Middleton's writings, especially his Letters from Rome, and To Waterland, as the basis of my own faith. These writings have never been answered, nor can be answered by quoting historical proofs, as they have done. For these facts, therefore, I cling to their learning, so much superior to my own.

Jefferson continued to express his strong objections to the doctrines of the virgin birth, the divinity of Jesus, and the Trinity. In a letter to Adams (April 11, 1823), Jefferson wrote, "And the day will come, when the mystical generation of Jesus, by the Supreme Being as His Father, in the womb of a virgin, will be classed with the fable of the generation of Minerva in the brain of Jupiter."

In an 1821 letter, he wrote:

No one sees with greater pleasure than myself the progress of reason in its advances towards rational Christianity. When we shall have done away the incomprehensible jargon of the Trinitarian arithmetic, that three are one, and one is three; when we shall have knocked down the artificial scaffolding, reared to mask from view the simple structure of Jesus; when, in short, we shall have unlearned everything which has been taught since His day, and got back to the pure and simple doctrines He inculcated, we shall then be truly and worthily His disciples; and my opinion is that if nothing had ever been added to what flowed purely from His lips, the whole world would at this day have been Christian. I know that the case you cite, of Dr. Drake, has been a common one. The religion-builders have so distorted and deformed the doctrines of Jesus, so muffled them in mysticisms, fancies and falsehoods, have caricatured them into forms so monstrous and inconceivable, as to shock reasonable thinkers, to revolt them against the whole, and drive them rashly to pronounce its Founder an impostor. Had there never been a commentator, there never would have been an infidel. ... I have little doubt that the whole of our country will soon be rallied to the unity of the Creator, and, I hope, to the pure doctrines of Jesus also.

Jefferson once wrote to the minister of the First Parish Church (Unitarian) in Portland, Maine, asking for services for him and a small group of friends. The church responded that it did not have clergy to send to the South. In an 1825 letter to Waterhouse, Jefferson wrote,

I am anxious to see the doctrine of one god commenced in our state. But the population of my neighborhood is too slender, and is too much divided into other sects to maintain any one preacher well. I must therefore be contented to be an Unitarian by myself, altho I know there are many around me who would become so, if once they could hear the questions fairly stated.

When followers of Richard Price and Priestley began debating over the existence of free-will and the soul (Priestley had taken the materialist position), Jefferson expressed reservations that Unitarians were finding it important to dispute doctrine with one another. In 1822 he held the Quakers up as an example for them to emulate.

In Jefferson's time, Unitarianism was generally considered a branch of Christianity. Originally it questioned the doctrine of the Trinity and the pre-existence of Christ. During the period 1800–1850, Unitarianism began also to question the existence of miracles, the biblical inspiration, and the virgin birth, though not yet the resurrection of Jesus. Contemporary Unitarianism no longer implies belief in a deity; some Unitarians are theists and some are not. Modern Unitarians consider Jefferson both a kindred spirit and an important figure in their history. The Famous UUs website says:

Like many others of his time (he died just one year after the founding of institutional Unitarianism in America), Jefferson was a Unitarian in theology, though not in church membership. He never joined a Unitarian congregation: there were none near his home in Virginia during his lifetime. He regularly attended Joseph Priestley's Pennsylvania church when he was nearby, and said that Priestley's theology was his own, and there is no doubt Priestley should be identified as Unitarian. Jefferson remained a member of the Episcopal congregation near his home, but removed himself from those available to become godparents, because he was not sufficiently in agreement with the Trinitarian theology. His work, the Jefferson Bible, was Unitarian in theology ...

== See also ==
- Bibliography of Thomas Jefferson
- Jesuism
- Religious affiliations of presidents of the United States
- Theistic rationalism

== Bibliography ==
- Gaustad, Edwin S. Sworn on the Altar of God: A Religious Biography of Thomas Jefferson (2001) Wm. B. Eerdmans Publishing, ISBN 0-8028-0156-0
- Healey, Robert M. Jefferson on religion in public education (Yale University Press, 1962)
- Koch, Adrienne. The Philosophy of Thomas Jefferson (Columbia University Press, 1943)
- Neem, Johann N. "Beyond the Wall: Reinterpreting Jefferson's Danbury Address." Journal of the Early Republic 27.1 (2007): 139–154.
- Novak, Michael. The founders on God and government (Rowman & Littlefield Publishers, 2004)
- Perry, Barbara A. "Jefferson's legacy to the Supreme Court: Freedom of religion." Journal of Supreme Court History 31.2 (2006): 181–198.
- Ragosta, John A. "The Virginia Statute for Establishing Religious Freedom." in y Francis D. Cogliano, ed., A Companion to Thomas Jefferson (2011): 75–90.
- Sanford, Charles B. The Religious Life of Thomas Jefferson (1987) University of Virginia Press, ISBN 0-8139-1131-1
- Sheridan, Eugene R. Jefferson and Religion, preface by Martin Marty, (2001) University of North Carolina Press, ISBN 1-882886-08-9
- Edited by Jackson, Henry E., President, College for Social Engineers, Washington, D.C. "The Thomas Jefferson Bible" (1923) Copyright Boni and Liveright, Inc. Printed in the United States of America. Arranged by Thomas Jefferson. Translated by R. F. Weymouth. Located in the National Museum, Washington, D.C.

=== Primary sources ===
- From Thomas Jefferson to John Adams, 11 April 1823
- "Thomas Jefferson's Bible" – at National Museum of American History
