= Governor Thomas =

Governor Thomas may refer to:

- Arthur Lloyd Thomas (1851–1924), Governor of Utah Territory from 1889 to 1893
- Charles Thomas (Delaware governor) (1790–1848), 25th Governor of Delaware
- Charles S. Thomas (1849–1934), 11th Governor of Colorado
- Francis Thomas (1799–1876), 26th Governor of Maryland
- Sir George Thomas, 1st Baronet (died 1774), Governor of the British Leeward Islands from 1753 to 1766
- James Thomas (Governor of Maryland) (1785–1845), 23rd Governor of Maryland
- Philip Francis Thomas (1810–1890), 28th Governor of Maryland
- Shenton Thomas (1879–1962), Governor of Nyasaland from 1929 to 1932, Governor of the Gold Coast from 1932 to 1934, and 21st Governor of the Straits Settlements from 1934 to 1942 and from 1945 to 1946
