= Utah Territory =

Territory of the U.S. between 1850-1896

Coordinates: 39°50′N 113°30′W

Territory of Utah
- Organized incorporated territory of the United States
- 1850–1896
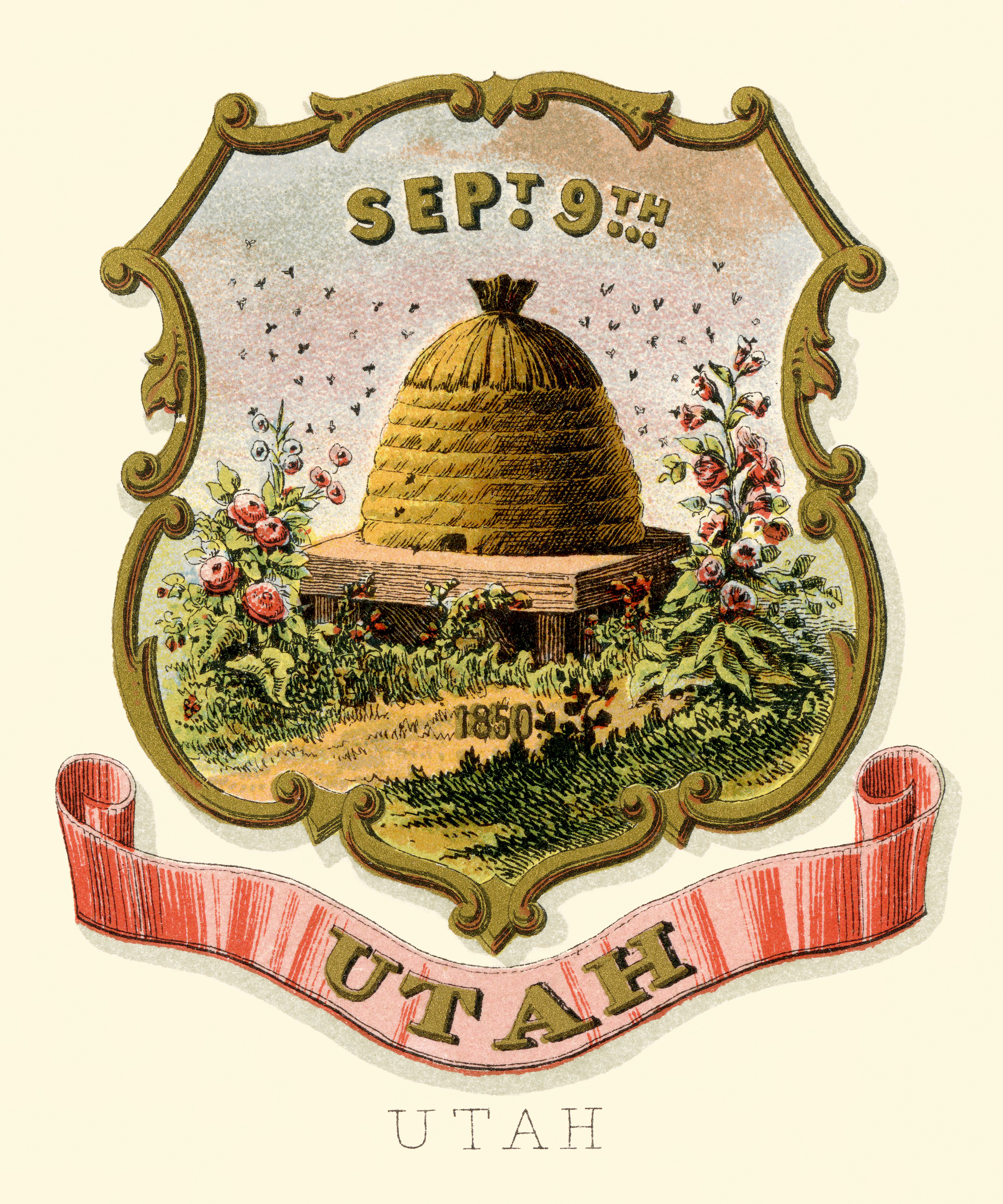
- Territorial coat of arms (1876)

- The Utah Territory upon its creation, with modern state boundaries shown for reference
- Capital: Fillmore (1851–1856); Salt Lake City
- Government
  - Type: Organized incorporated territory
- Governor
  - 1851–58: Brigham Young
  - 1858–61: Alfred Cumming
  - 1875–80: George W. Emery
  - 1880–86: Eli Houston Murray
  - 1886–89: Caleb Walton West
  - 1889-1893: Arthur Lloyd Thomas
  - 1893–96: Caleb Walton West
- Legislature: Legislative Assembly
- History
  - State of Deseret: 1849
  - Utah Organic Act: September 9 1850
  - Colorado Territory formed: February 28, 1861
  - Nevada Territory formed: March 2, 1861
  - Wyoming Territory formed: July 25, 1868
  - Statehood: January 4 1896
Preceded by
Alta California
Santa Fe de Nuevo México
Succeeded by
Utah
Nevada Territory
Wyoming Territory
Nevada
Colorado Territory

The Territory of Utah was an organized incorporated territory of the United States that existed from September 9, 1850, until January 4, 1896, when the final extent of the territory was admitted to the Union as the State of Utah, the 45th state. At its creation, the Territory of Utah included all of the present-day State of Utah, most of the current state of Nevada save for a portion of Southern Nevada (including the metro area of the city of Las Vegas), much of modern western Colorado, and the extreme southwest corner of present-day Wyoming.

== History ==
The area has been inhabited by indigenous people for over 12,000 years. The area was home to the Puebloan who built stone masonry buildings as well as the Fremont culture until a long lasting drought in the 1200s caused them to abandon the area. Later, the Navajo, Paiute and Shoshone peoples settled to the area. Juan Antonio de Rivera from New Spain is the first known European to enter the area in 1765.

When the Mormon pioneers moving westward across the Great Plains began settling the Salt Lake Valley around the Great Salt Lake in 1847, they relied on existing institutions within the Church of Jesus Christ of Latter-day Saints (LDS Church) in lieu of secular civil government.

In September 1850, the Utah Territory was organized by an organic act of the United States Congress, approved by the newly succeeded 13th President Millard Fillmore, only two months after the former Vice President acceded to the higher office upon the sudden death in July 1850 of his predecessor Zachary Taylor. The bill was signed into law on the same day that the State of California was admitted to the Union as the 31st state. The organization of the Utah Territory marked the first time that the American Union had jumped across the North American continent to the opposite Pacific Ocean west coast. The territory was made from land in the southern portion of the Mexican Cession, which was acquired by the United States from the Centralist Republic of Mexico following the latter's defeat in the Mexican–American War. The creation of the new Territory of Utah around the Great Basin and the Great Salt Lake was part of the political Compromise of 1850, which sought to preserve the balance of power between Southern slave states and free states in the North.

The creation of the Territory, with no mention at all of the divisive issue of slavery in the documents, was partially the result of a petition sent by the Mormon pioneers under the leadership of Brigham Young, the second church president. The petition had asked Congress to allow them to enter the Union as the State of Deseret, which had been organized the year before, with its capital as Salt Lake City and with proposed borders that encompassed the entire Great Basin and the watershed of the Colorado River, including all or part of nine current U.S. states in the southwest. The Mormon settlers had drafted a state constitution in 1849 and Deseret had become the de facto government in the Great Basin by the time of the creation of the subsequent federal Utah Territory.

Following the organization of the Territory, Young was inaugurated as its first territorial Governor of Utah. The first territorial capital city and capitol building was located in the small town of Fillmore, Utah, from 1850 to 1856. The town of Fillmore was named for the new 13th president Millard Fillmore, who had signed the organic act incorporating the territory. A small local government was set up in Fillmore, including the Territorial Assembly. Young, however, remained mostly in his Beehive House residence in Salt Lake City, traveling to Fillmore until his death in 1877. The capital of the Utah Territory was relocated in 1856 to the major and largest town of Salt Lake City, which built a new territorial capitol building for the government and housed its assembly and governor's offices for the next four decades. Salt Lake City would continue as the new state capital after statehood in 1896. The Utah State Capitol building was later constructed there.

During his governorship, Young exerted considerable power over the territory. For example, in 1873, the territorial legislature granted Young the exclusive right to manufacture and distill whiskey.

Mormon governance in the territory was regarded as controversial by much of the rest of the nation, partly fed by continuing lurid newspaper depictions of polygamous marriages practiced by the settlers. Polygamy had been part of the cause of their preceding flight from Nauvoo, Illinois, when they had been persecuted and forcibly removed from their settlements in several eastern states.

Although the Mormons were now the majority in the Great Salt Lake basin, the western area of the new territory soon began to attract many non-Mormon settlers, especially after the 1858 discovery of silver at the famous Comstock Lode ore deposits in the Virginia City area, east of the Sierra Nevada mountain ranges and Lake Tahoe. Three years later, the new Nevada Territory was created out of the western part of the preexisting Utah Territory. The federal government desired more control over the booming silver mining industry in the region on the eve of the Civil War. Ten years after the first mineral findings along the American River in California, non-Mormons also entered the territory from the east during the Pikes Peak Gold Rush, resulting in the discovery of gold at Breckenridge in the Utah Territory in 1859. In 1861, additional legislative action was taken by Congress and the new 16th president Abraham Lincoln to transfer a large portion of the eastern territory to the newly created adjacent Colorado Territory.

=== Women's suffrage ===
In 1869, the territory's legislature, the Territorial Assembly, approved and ratified women's suffrage. On 12 February, 1870, Utah Territory extended the right to vote to free white women who were US citizens, aged 21 or older. Utah held municipal elections and a territorial election before Wyoming did. Hence, women in Utah cast ballots before women in Wyoming. Schoolteacher Seraph Young Ford was the first woman to vote under a women's equal suffrage law in the US, casting her ballot in the Salt Lake City municipal election on 14 February 1870.

=== Admission to the Union ===
46 years after the organization of the territory, it was admitted to the Union as the 45th State of Utah in 1896. Utah had remained a territory for much longer than the neighboring territories of Nevada and Colorado: Nevada had been admitted to the Union in 1864 in the midst of the ongoing American Civil War, only three years after its territorial formation, and Colorado had been admitted in 1876 during the American Centennial celebration year, fifteen years after first becoming a territory.

The evolution of the shrinking boundaries of the federal Utah Territory from its creation by Congress in 1850 to 1896, when 45th statehood was granted

== Coat of arms ==
The Utah state coat of arms appears on the state seal and state flag. The beehive was chosen as the emblem for the provisional State of Deseret in 1848 and represents the state's industrious and hard-working inhabitants, and the virtues of thrift and perseverance. The sego lilies on either side symbolize peace.

== Territory flag ==
The first flag to represent the Territory flew in 1851 and consist of 13 red and white stripes, a blue canton with 13 stars and eagle that was positioned above a large 5 pointed star. The flag was briefly preserved in the Smithsonian Institution, but its location is now unknown. A second flag, raised in 1854, similarly contained "...stars, stripes, eagle, and beehive." The flag was raised up a flag pole on temple block to celebrate Pioneer day. On July 4th of the following year, at the Governor's mansion, they "...unfurled the territorial flag." In 1856, during the Pioneer day celebrations in Provo, the city flew many territorial flags across its streets.

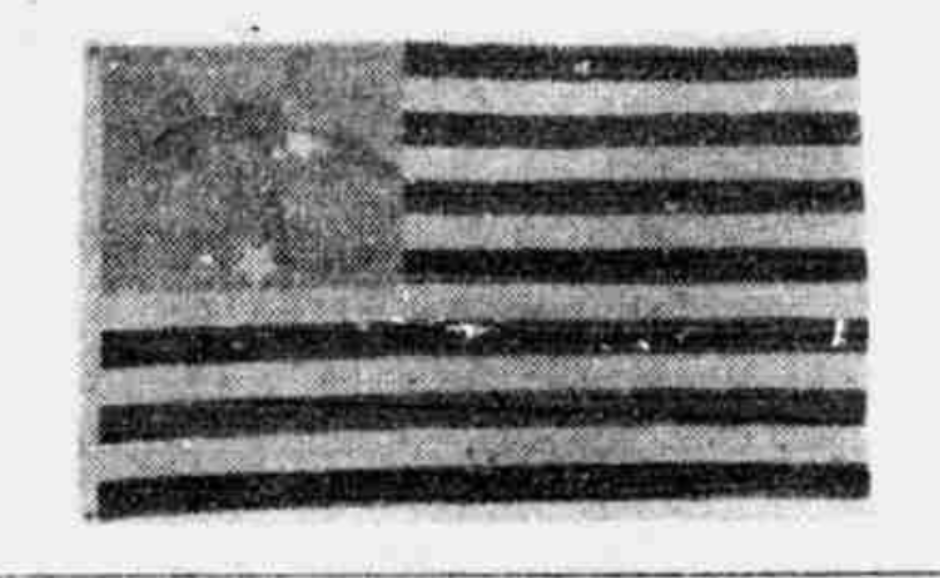
Territory flag from 1851

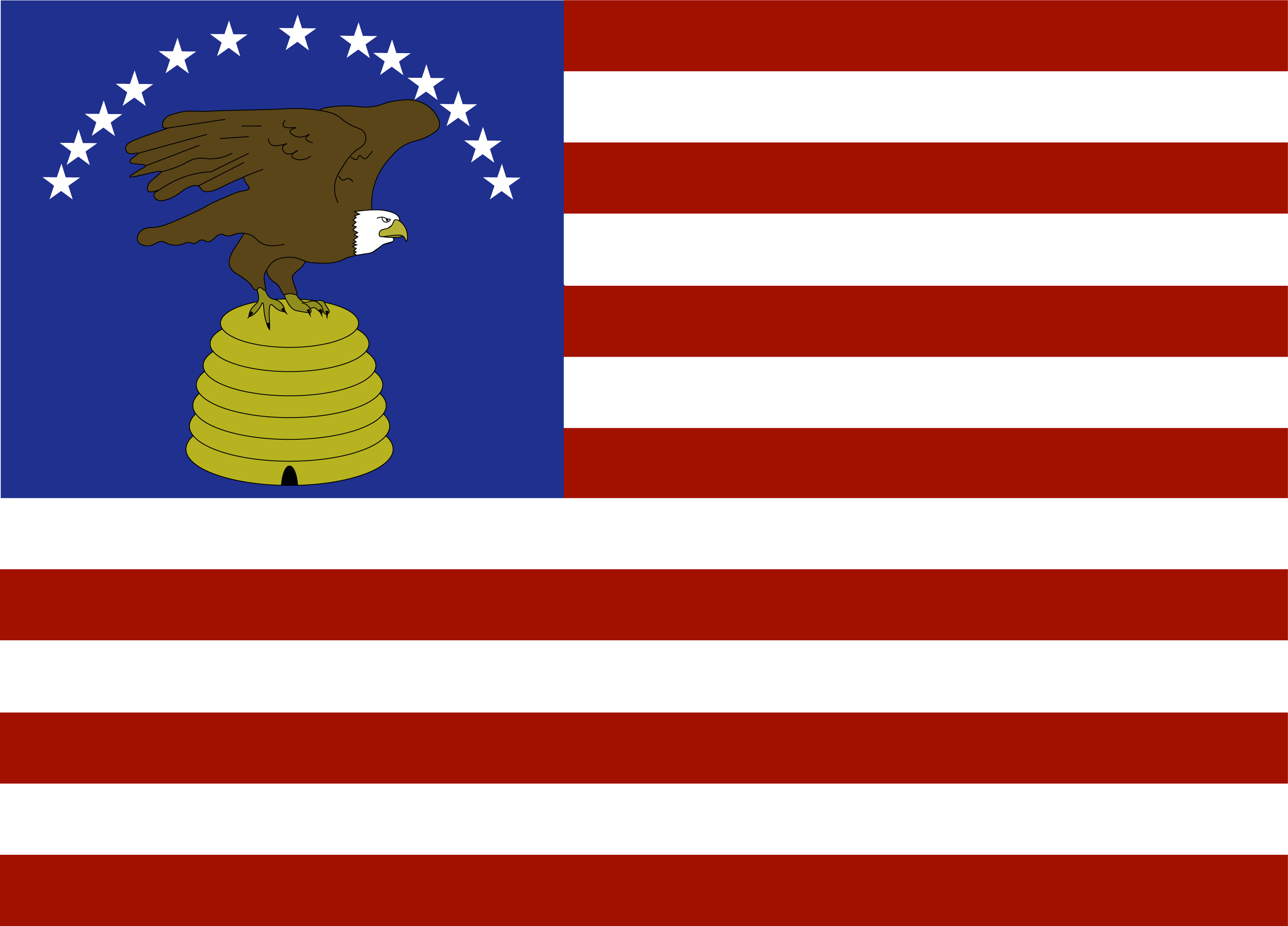
Reconstruction of the Territory flag that flew on temple block in 1854

== Population ==
Historical population
Year	Pop.	±%
1850	11,380	—
1860	40,273	+253.9%
1870	86,336	+114.4%
1880	146,608	+69.8%
1890	210,779	+43.8%
Source: 1850–1890

In 1850, nine churches with regular services in the Utah Territory were unclassified by historian Edwin Gaustad in his Historical Atlas of Religion in America (1962), but were likely LDS churches. In the 1890 United States census, 25 counties in the Utah Territory reported the following population counts (after seven reported the following counts in the 1850 United States census):

1890 Rank	County	1850 Population	1890 Population
1	Salt Lake	6,157	58,457
2	Utah	2,026	23,768
3	Weber	1,186	22,723
4	Cache	–	15,509
5	Sanpete	365	13,146
6	Summit	–	7,733
7	Box Elder	–	7,642
8	Davis	1,134	6,751
9	Sevier	–	6,199
10	Juab	–	5,582
11	Emery	–	5,076
12	Millard	–	4,033
13	Washington	–	4,009
14	Tooele	152	3,700
15	Wasatch	–	3,595
16	Beaver	–	3,340
17	Piute	–	2,842
18	Uintah	–	2,762
19	Iron	360	2,683
20	Garfield	–	2,457
21	Morgan	–	1,780
22	Kane	–	1,685
23	Rich	–	1,527
24	Grand	–	541
25	San Juan	–	365
	Indian reservations	4,645	–
	Utah Territory	11,380	210,779

== See also ==
- Historic regions of the United States
- History of Utah
- Territorial evolution of the United States
