= Jefferson Bible =

1820 book constructed by Thomas Jefferson

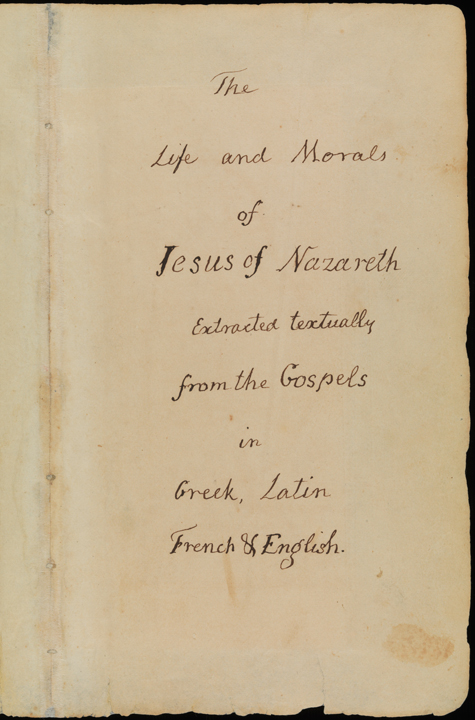
- The title page of the Jefferson Bible, written in Jefferson's hand, reads: The Life and Morals of Jesus of Nazareth Extracted Textually from the Gospels in Greek, Latin, French & English.
- Material: Red Morocco goatskin leather, handmade wove paper, iron gall ink
- Size: 8.3 in × 5.2 in × 1.3 in (21.1 cm × 13.2 cm × 3.3 cm)
- Writing: Greek, Latin, French, and English
- Created: c. 1819, at Monticello
- Discovered: Acquired by the Smithsonian Institution in 1895
- Present location: Smithsonian National Museum of American History
- Smithsonian National Museum of American History: Thomas Jefferson's Bible

The Life and Morals of Jesus of Nazareth, commonly referred to as the Jefferson Bible, is one of two religious works constructed by Thomas Jefferson. Jefferson compiled the manuscripts but never published them. The first, The Philosophy of Jesus of Nazareth, was completed in 1804, but no copies exist today. The second, The Life and Morals of Jesus of Nazareth, was completed in 1820 by cutting and pasting, with a razor and glue, numerous sections from the New Testament as extractions of the doctrine of Jesus. Jefferson's condensed composition excludes all miracles by Jesus and most mentions of the supernatural, including sections of the four gospels that contain the Resurrection and most other miracles, and passages that portray Jesus as divine.

== Early draft ==
In an 1803 letter to Joseph Priestley, Jefferson stated that he conceived the idea of writing his view of the "Christian System" in a conversation with Benjamin Rush during 1798–99. He proposes beginning with a review of the morals of the ancient philosophers, moving on to the "deism and ethics of the Jews", and concluding with the "principles of a pure deism" taught by Jesus, "omitting the question of his deity". Jefferson explains that he does not have the time, and urges the task on Priestley as the person best equipped to accomplish it.

Jefferson accomplished a more limited goal in 1804 with The Philosophy of Jesus of Nazareth, the predecessor to The Life and Morals of Jesus of Nazareth. He described it in a letter to John Adams dated October 12, 1813:

In extracting the pure principles which he taught, we should have to strip off the artificial vestments in which they have been muffled by priests, who have travestied them into various forms, as instruments of riches and power to them. We must dismiss the Platonists & Plotinists, the Stagyrites & Gamalielites, the Eclectics the Gnostics & Scholastics, Logos & Demi-urgos, Aeons & Daemons male & female, with a long train of Etc. Etc. Etc. or, shall I say at once, of Nonsense. We must reduce our volume to the simple evangelists, select, even from them, the very words only of Jesus, paring off the Amphibologisms into which they have been led, by forgetting often, or not understanding, what had fallen from him, by giving their own misconceptions as his dicta, and expressing unintelligibly for others what they had not understood themselves. There will be found remaining the most sublime and benevolent code of morals which has ever been offered to man. I have performed this operation for my own use, by cutting verse by verse out of the printed book, and arranging the matter which is evidently his, and which is as easily distinguishable as diamonds in a dunghill. The result is an 8vo of 46 pages of pure and unsophisticated doctrines

Jefferson wrote that "The doctrines which flowed from the lips of Jesus Himself are within the comprehension of a child". He explained these doctrines were such as were "professed & acted on by the unlettered apostles, the Apostolic fathers, and the Christians of the 1st century". In a letter to Reverend Charles Clay, he described his results:

Probably you have heard me say I had taken the four Evangelists, had cut out from them every text they had recorded of the moral precepts of Jesus, and arranged them in a certain order; and although they appeared but as fragments, yet fragments of the most sublime edifice of morality which had ever been exhibited to man.

Jefferson never referred to his work as a Bible, and the full title of this 1804 version was The Philosophy of Jesus of Nazareth, being Extracted from the Account of His Life and Doctrines Given by Matthew, Mark, Luke and John; Being an Abridgement of the New Testament for the Use of the Indians, Unembarrased [uncomplicated] with Matters of Fact or Faith beyond the Level of their Comprehensions.

Jefferson frequently expressed discontent with this earlier version, which was merely a compilation of the moral teachings of Jesus. The Life and Morals of Jesus of Nazareth represents the fulfillment of his desire to produce a more carefully assembled edition which includes what, in his estimation, can be known of the life of Jesus, whose deeds were the embodiment of his teachings.

== Content ==
Using a razor and glue, Jefferson cut and pasted his arrangement of selected verses from a 1794 bilingual Latin/Greek version using the text of the Plantin Polyglot, a French Geneva Bible and the King James Version of the gospels of Matthew, Mark, Luke, and John in chronological order—putting together excerpts from one text with those of another to create a single narrative. Thus he begins with Luke 2 and Luke 3, then follows with Mark 1 and Matthew 3. He provides a record of which verses he selected, and of the order he chose in his Table of the Texts from the Evangelists employed in this Narrative and of the order of their arrangement.

Consistent with his naturalistic outlook and intent, most supernatural events are not included in Jefferson's heavily edited compilation. Paul K. Conkin states that "For the teachings of Jesus he concentrated on his milder admonitions (the Sermon on the Mount) and his most memorable parables. What resulted is a reasonably coherent, but at places oddly truncated, biography. If necessary to exclude the miraculous, Jefferson would cut the text even in mid-verse." Historian Edwin Scott Gaustad explains, "If a moral lesson was embedded in a miracle, the lesson survived in Jeffersonian scripture, but the miracle did not. Even when this took some rather careful cutting with scissors or razor, Jefferson managed to maintain Jesus' role as a great moral teacher, not as a shaman or faith healer."

Therefore, The Life and Morals of Jesus of Nazareth begins with an account of Jesus' birth without references to angels, genealogy, or prophecy. Miracles, references to the divinity of Jesus, and Jesus' resurrection are also absent from his collection.

The work ends with the words: "Now, in the place where He was crucified, there was a garden; and in the garden a new sepulchre, wherein was never man yet laid. There laid they Jesus. And rolled a great stone to the door of the sepulchre, and departed." These words correspond to the ending of John 19 in the Bible.

== Purpose ==
Commenting on how Jefferson's interest in Jesus and the Bible changed over time, Mark Holowchak writes that "[t]here is what might be called his literary-criticism phase of his salad years and his naturalized-religion phase of his later, more mature years. In his literary-criticism phase, Jefferson's interest in the Bible is critical... The Bible is a significant work of literature that is taken literally by millions, in spite of numerous hyperboles and absurdities. Thus, it is as good a book as any, and much better than most, on which to hone one's critical skills." Here Jefferson follows the lead of Lord Bolingbroke whose religious views Jefferson commonplaced abundantly earlier in life in his Literary Commonplace Book.

In a letter to Bishop James Madison (31 Jan. 1800), cousin to the politician and future president of the same name, Jefferson expresses keen interest in Jesus as philosopher. He writes of the beliefs of German philosopher and founder of Illuminism, Adam Weishaupt. "Wishaupt [sic] ...is among those (as you know the excellent Price and Priestly [sic] also are) who believe in the indefinite perfectibility of man. He thinks he may in time be rendered so perfect that he will be able to govern himself in every circumstance so as to injure none, to do all the good he can, to leave government no occasion to exercise their powers over him, & of course to render political government useless. ...Wishaupt believes that to promote this perfection of the human character was the object of Jesus Christ. That his intention was simply to reinstate natural religion, & by diffusing the light of his morality, to teach us to govern ourselves. his precepts are the love of god & love of our neighbor. and by teaching innocence of conduct, he expected to place men in their natural state of liberty & equality. he says, no one ever laid a surer foundation for liberty than our grand master, Jesus of Nazareth."

As president, he expresses those sentiments in a letter to Robinson over a year later (23 Mar. 1801). "The Christian religion, when divested of the rags in which they have enveloped it, and brought to the original purity and simplicity of its benevolent institutor, is a religion of all others most friendly to liberty, science, and the freest expansion of the human mind." The letters intimate great appreciation of the life and words of Jesus as the true cynosure of republican government.

It is understood by some historians that Jefferson composed it for his own satisfaction, supporting the Christian faith as he saw it. Gaustad states, "The retired President did not produce his small book to shock or offend a somnolent world; he composed it for himself, for his devotion, for his assurance, for a more restful sleep at nights and a more confident greeting of the mornings."

There is no record of this or its successor being for "the Use of the Indians", despite the stated intent of the 1804 version being that purpose. Although the government long supported Christian activity among Indians, and in Notes on the State of Virginia Jefferson supported "a perpetual mission among the Indian tribes", at least in the interest of anthropology, and as President sanctioned financial support for a priest and church for the Kaskaskia Indians, Jefferson did not make these works public. Instead, he acknowledged the existence of The Life and Morals of Jesus of Nazareth to only a few friends, saying that he read it before retiring at night, as he found this project intensely personal and private.

Ainsworth Rand Spofford, Librarian of Congress (1864–1894) stated: "His original idea was to have the life and teachings of the Saviour, told in similar excerpts, prepared for the Indians, thinking this simple form would suit them best. But, abandoning this, the formal execution of his plan took the shape above described, which was for his individual use. He used the four languages that he might have the texts in them side by side, convenient for comparison. In the book he pasted a map of the ancient world and the Holy Land, with which he studied the New Testament."

Some speculate that the reference to "Indians" in the 1804 title may have been an allusion to Jefferson's Federalist opponents, as he likewise used this indirect tactic against them at least once before, that being in his second inaugural address, or that he was providing himself a cover story in case this work became public.

Also referring to the 1804 version, Jefferson wrote, "A more beautiful or precious morsel of ethics I have never seen; it is a document in proof that I am a real Christian, that is to say, a disciple of the doctrines of Jesus."

Jefferson's claim to be a Christian was made in response to those who accused him of being otherwise, due to his unorthodox view of the Bible and conception of Christ. Recognizing his rather unusual views, Jefferson stated in a letter (1819) to Ezra Stiles Ely, "You say you are a Calvinist. I am not. I am of a sect by myself, as far as I know."

== Publication history ==
After completion of the Life and Morals, about 1820, Jefferson shared it with a number of friends, but he never allowed it to be published during his lifetime.

The most complete form Jefferson produced was inherited by his grandson, Thomas Jefferson Randolph, and was acquired in 1895 by the National Museum in Washington. The book was later published as a lithographic reproduction by an act of the United States Congress in 1904. Beginning in 1904 and continuing every other year until the 1950s, new members of Congress were given a copy of the Jefferson Bible. Until the practice first stopped, copies were provided by the Government Printing Office. A private organization, the Libertarian Press, revived the practice in 1997.

In January 2013, the American Humanist Association published an edition of the Jefferson Bible, distributing a free copy to every member of Congress and President Barack Obama. A Jefferson Bible For the Twenty-First Century adds samples of passages that Jefferson chose to omit, as well as examples of the "best" and "worst" from the Hebrew Bible, the Quran, the Bhagavad Gita, the Buddhist Sūtras, and the Book of Mormon.

The Smithsonian published the first full-color facsimile of the Jefferson Bible on November 1, 2011. Released in tandem with a Jefferson Bible exhibit at the National Museum of American History, the reproduction features introductory essays by Smithsonian Political History curators Harry R. Rubenstein and Barbara Clark Smith, and Smithsonian Senior Paper Conservator Janice Stagnitto Ellis. The book's pages were digitized using a Hasselblad H4D50-50 megapixel DSLR camera and a Zeiss 120 macro lens, and were photographed by Smithsonian photographer, Hugh Talman.

The entire Jefferson Bible is available to view, page-by-page, on the Smithsonian National Museum of American History's website. The high-resolution digitization enables the public to see the minute details and anomalies of each page.

The text is in the public domain and is thus freely available on the Internet.

== Recent history ==
In 1895, the Smithsonian Institution under the leadership of librarian Cyrus Adler purchased the original Jefferson Bible from Jefferson's great-granddaughter Carolina Randolph for $400. A conservation effort commencing in 2009, led by Senior Paper Conservator Janice Stagnitto Ellis, in partnership with the museum's Political History department, allowed for a public unveiling in an exhibit open from November 11, 2011, through May 28, 2012, at the National Museum of American History. Also displayed were the source books from which Jefferson cut his selected passages, and the 1904 edition of the Jefferson Bible requested and distributed by the United States Congress. The exhibit was accompanied by an interactive digital facsimile available on the museum's public website. On February 20, 2012, the Smithsonian Channel premiered the documentary Jefferson's Secret Bible.

The Jefferson Bible at the Smithsonian National Museum of American History

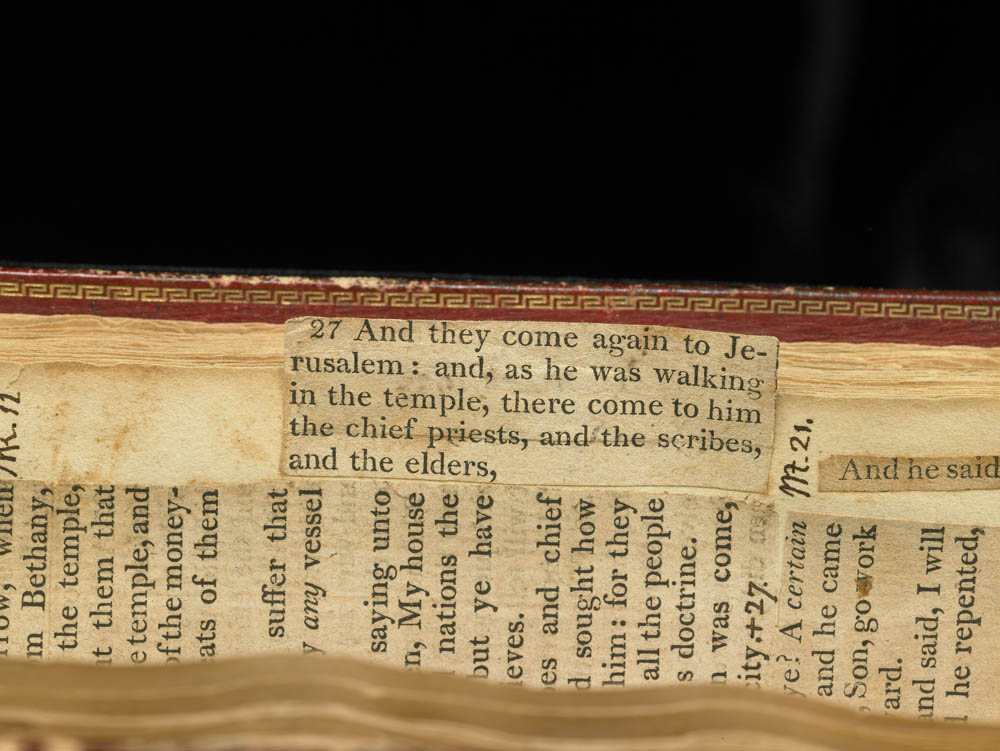
Fold-out tab Jefferson glued in the margin of page 56

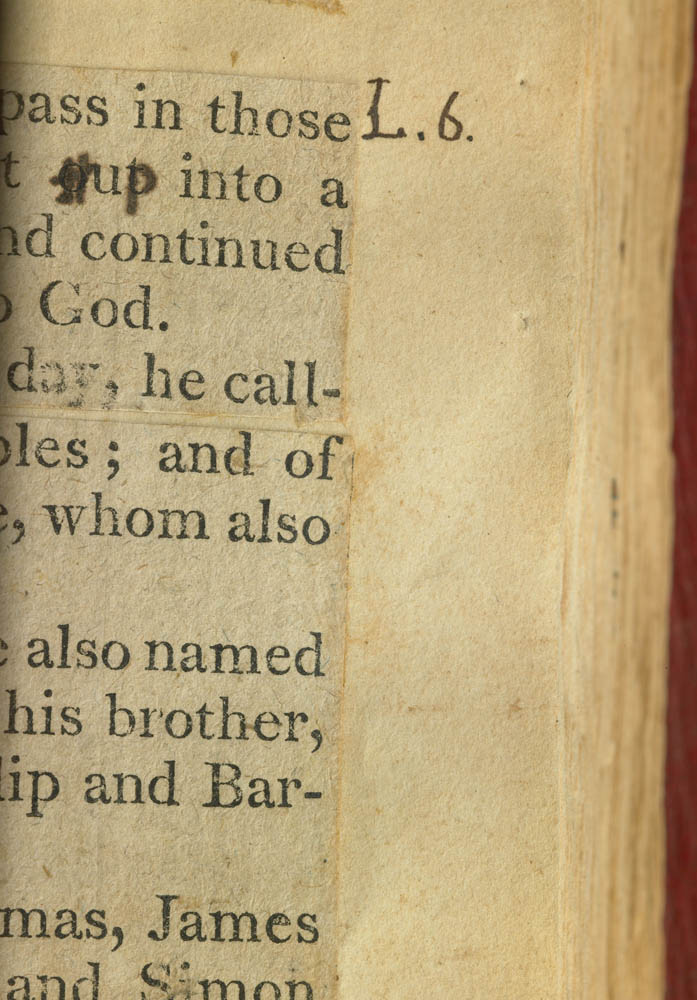
Jefferson textually corrects "out" into "up"

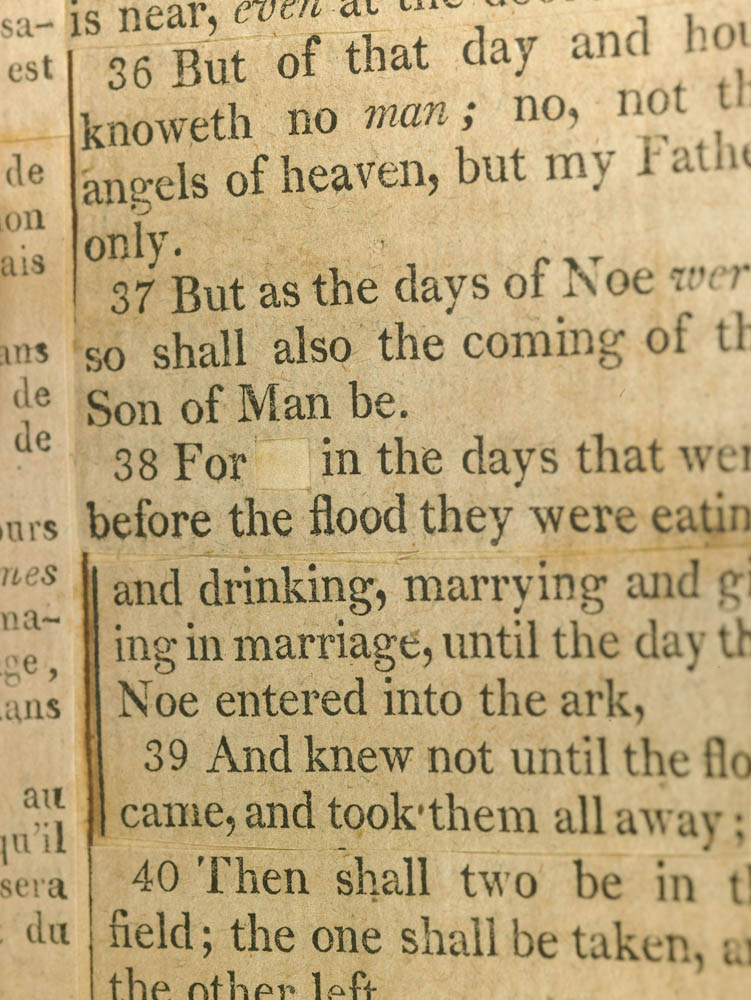
Jefferson extracts the word "as" from a sentence, to avoid three prepositions in a row

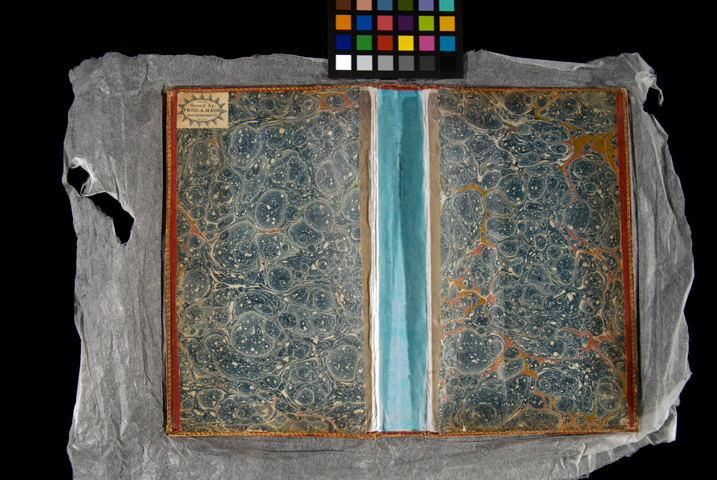
Marbled paper inside the book's covers

== Editions in print ==
Facsimile

- The Jefferson Bible, Smithsonian Edition: The Life and Morals of Jesus of Nazareth (2011) Smithsonian Books hardcover: ISBN 978-1588343123
- Jefferson's Extracts from the Gospels: 'The Philosophy of Jesus' and 'The Life and Morals of Jesus': The Papers of Thomas Jefferson: Second Series (1983) Princeton University Press hardcover: ISBN 0691046999, paperback: ISBN 0691102104
- THE Jefferson Bible (1964) Clarkston N. Potter, Inc hardcover: LCCN 64--19900
- The Life and Morals of Jesus of Nazareth (1904) United States Government Printing Office

Text

- Thomas Jefferson's Bible, With Introduction and Critical Commentary, Berlin: DeGruyter, 2017. ISBN 978-3110617566
- The Jefferson Bible: What Thomas Jefferson Selected as the Life and Morals of Jesus of Nazareth: ISBN 978-1936583218
- The Jefferson Bible: The Life and Morals of Jesus of Nazareth (2006) Dover Publications paperback: ISBN 0486449211
- The Jefferson Bible, (2006) Applewood Books hardcover: ISBN 1557091846
- The Jefferson Bible, introduction by Cyrus Adler, (2005) Digireads.com paperback: ISBN 1420924923
- The Jefferson Bible, introduction by Percival Everett, (2004) Akashic Books paperback: ISBN 1888451629
- The Jefferson Bible, introduction by M. A. Sotelo, (2004) Promotional Sales Books, LLC paperback
- Jefferson's "Bible": The Life and Morals of Jesus of Nazareth, introduction by Judd W. Patton, (1997) American Book Distributors paperback: ISBN 0929205022
- A Jefferson Bible for the Twenty-First Century, 2013, Humanist Press, paperback ISBN 978-0931779299, ebook ISBN 978-0931779305

== See also ==
- The Gospel in Brief, by Leo Tolstoy
- Bibliography of Thomas Jefferson
- Jesuism
- Religious views of Thomas Jefferson
