= 3rd Kentucky Cavalry Regiment =

3rd Kentucky Cavalry Regiment may refer to:

- 1st Kentucky Cavalry Regiment (Confederate), consolidated in 1862 into what is sometimes referred to as the "3rd Kentucky Cavalry"
- 3rd Kentucky Cavalry Regiment (Union), a regiment in the Union Army

== See also ==
- 3rd Kentucky Infantry Regiment (disambiguation)
