= Eli Houston Murray =

Governor of Utah (1843–1896)

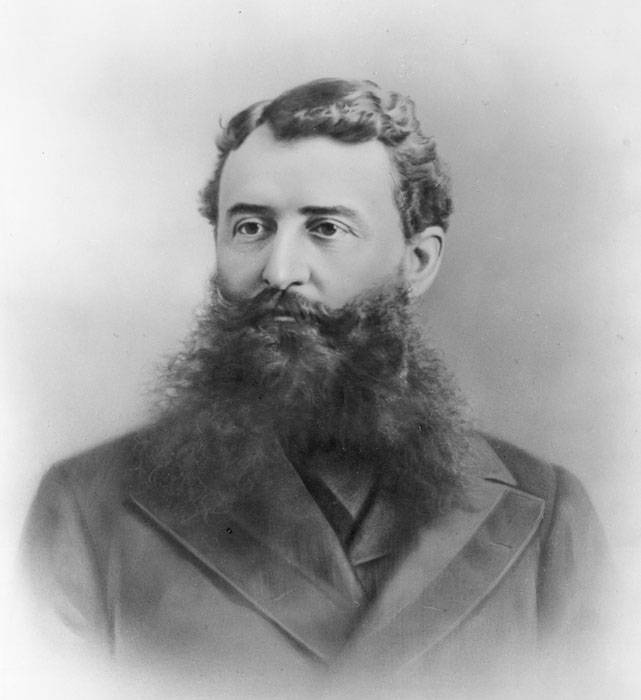

12th Governor of Utah Territory
- In office January 27, 1880 – March 18, 1886
- President: Rutherford B. Hayes; James Garfield; Chester A. Arthur; Grover Cleveland
- Preceded by: George W. Emery
- Succeeded by: Caleb Walton West

Personal details
- Born: February 10, 1843 Cloverport, Kentucky, US
- Died: October 18, 1896 (aged 53) Bowling Green, Kentucky, US
- Resting place: Arlington National Cemetery
- Spouse: Evelyn Neal
- Relatives: Eva Neale Murray
- Profession: U.S. marshal, newspaper editor, soldier, governor

Military service
- Allegiance: United States
- Branch/service: United States Army; Union Army
- Years of service: 1861–1865
- Rank: Colonel; Bvt. Brigadier General
- Commands: 3rd Kentucky Cavalry Regiment
- Battles/wars: American Civil War: Battle of Sacramento

Eli Houston Murray (February 10, 1843 – November 18, 1896) was Governor of Utah Territory between 1880 and 1886. The city of Murray, Utah was named for him.

Murray had served in the Union Army during the American Civil War as colonel of the 3rd Kentucky Cavalry Regiment. Colonel Murray was the first Union commander to clash with famed Confederate cavalry general Nathan Bedford Forrest at Sacramento, Kentucky near the end of 1861. He was brevetted to the rank of brigadier general when the war ended. In the next year, he was appointed U.S. Marshal for Kentucky and stayed on that post for 10 years; afterward, he managed a Kentucky newspaper.

Murray was appointed Governor of Utah Territory in 1880. The newly appointed anti-Mormon territorial governor openly supported the Liberal Party of Utah. Thus, the 1880 territory-wide election for a congressional delegate unexpectedly proved the closest that the Liberal Party got to sending a representative to Washington, D.C.

The Liberal candidate, Allen G. Campbell – with 1357 votes – lost resoundingly to Mormon General Authority George Q. Cannon, who had 18,567 votes. However, before Governor Murray certified the election, a protest on behalf of Campbell was filed. The protest listed a dozen claims, chiefly that Cannon, born in Liverpool, England, was an un-naturalized alien. The protest also claimed that Cannon's practice of polygamy was incompatible with the law and a delegate's oath of office. Murray agreed and issued certification to Campbell in spite of his poor showing.

Cannon, in Washington at the time, argued that only Congress could decide on a member's qualifications. He furthermore received a certificate from sympathetic territorial election officials, which stated he had received the most votes. This document convinced the House of Representatives clerk to enter Cannon's name on the roll, so Cannon began drawing delegate's salary.

Both Murray and Campbell traveled to Washington to dispute the seat. Each side battled over the position for over a year, even through the assassination and eventual death of President James Garfield. On February 25, 1882, the House of Representatives finally rejected both candidates. The House refused Cannon his seat not for his dubious citizenship, but for his practice of polygamy. The entire ordeal brought unfavorable national attention to Utah regarding the "Mormon Question" (polygamy).

Murray and his wife Eva Neale Murray are buried at Arlington National Cemetery.

Political offices
Preceded by George W. Emery	Governor of Utah Territory; 1880–1886	Succeeded by Caleb Walton West
