= George W. Emery =

American politician (1830–1909)

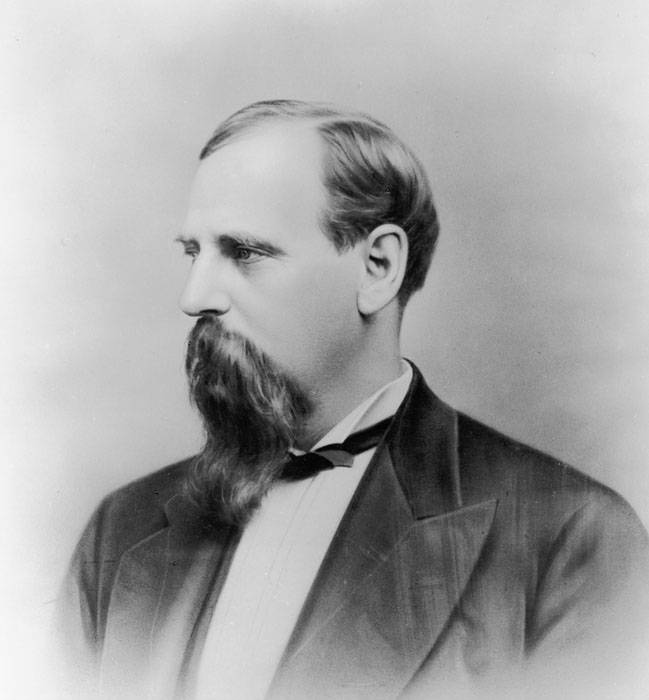

11th Governor of Utah Territory
- In office July 1, 1875 – January 27, 1880
- Appointed by: Ulysses S. Grant
- President: Ulysses S. Grant; Rutherford B. Hayes
- Preceded by: Samuel Beach Axtell
- Succeeded by: Eli Houston Murray

Personal details
- Born: August 13, 1830 Penobscot, Maine
- Died: July 10, 1909 (aged 78) Marshfield, Massachusetts
- Party: Republican
- Spouse: Marcia Hall
- Profession: Lawyer

George W. Emery (August 13, 1830 – July 10, 1909) was the eleventh governor of Utah Territory. Emery was appointed by President Ulysses S. Grant for Supervisor of Internal Revenue for the confederate states from 1870 to 1874 and governor in 1875. After his term ended in 1880, the Utah Legislature named Emery County, Utah in honor of him.

Political offices
Preceded by Samuel Beach Axtell	Governor of Utah Territory; 1875–1880	Succeeded by Eli Houston Murray
