= Caleb Walton West =

American judge (1844–1909)

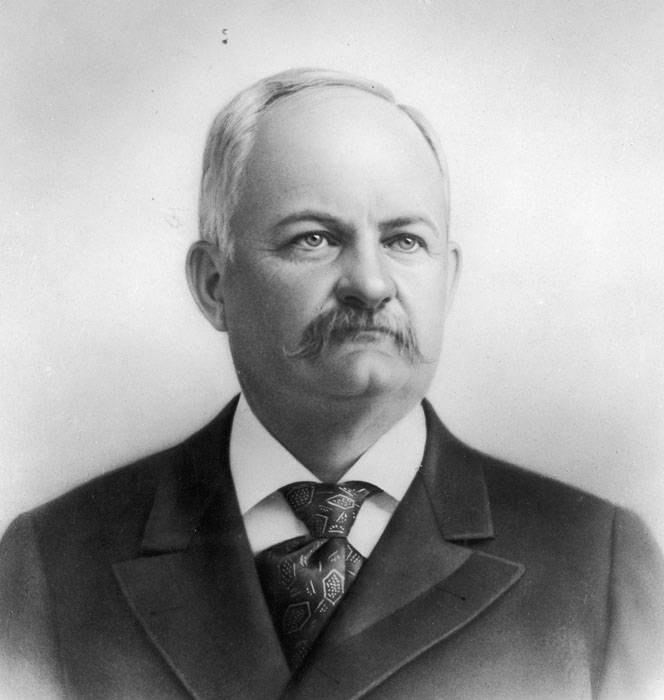

13th Governor of Utah Territory
- In office May 12, 1886 – May 6, 1889
- President: Grover Cleveland
- Preceded by: Eli Houston Murray
- Succeeded by: Arthur Lloyd Thomas

15th Governor of Utah Territory
- In office May 9, 1893 – January 4, 1896
- President: Grover Cleveland
- Preceded by: Arthur Lloyd Thomas
- Succeeded by: Heber Manning Wells as state Governor

Personal details
- Born: May 25, 1844 Cynthiana, Kentucky
- Died: January 25, 1909 (aged 64)
- Occupation: Lawyer, judge

Caleb Walton West (May 25, 1844 – January 25, 1909) was an American politician.

Born in Cynthiana in Harrison County, Kentucky, West was a Confederate veteran and a municipal judge in Kentucky. He was Governor of Utah Territory twice, between 1886 and 1888 and between 1893 and 1896, the last before statehood.
