= 3rd Kentucky Cavalry Regiment (Union) =

- Active: December 13, 1861 – July 15, 1865
- Country: United States
- Allegiance: Union
- Branch: Cavalry
- Engagements: Battle of Shiloh; Siege of Corinth; Battle of Perryville; Battle of Stones River; Atlanta campaign Battle of Resaca; Battle of Kennesaw Mountain; Siege of Atlanta; Battle of Jonesboro; Sherman's March to the Sea; Carolinas campaign Battle of Bentonville

The 3rd Kentucky Cavalry Regiment was a Cavalry Regiment that served in the Union Army during the American Civil War.

== Service ==
The 3rd Kentucky Cavalry Regiment was organized at Calhoun, Kentucky and McLean County, Kentucky and mustered in for a three-year enlistment on December 13, 1861, under the command of Colonel James Streshly Jackson.

The regiment was attached to 5th Division, Army of the Ohio, to June 1862. Cavalry Brigade, Army of the Ohio, to September 1862. 1st Brigade, Cavalry Division, Army of the Ohio, to November 1862. 1st Brigade, Cavalry Division, Army of the Cumberland, to January 1863. 1st Brigade, 1st Cavalry Division, Army of the Cumberland, to March 1863. District of Western Kentucky, Department of the Ohio, to June 1863. 1st Brigade, 2nd Division, XXIII Corps, Department of the Ohio, to August 1863. Unattached, Hopkinsville, Kentucky, 1st Division, XXIII Corps, to October 1863. District of South Central Kentucky, 1st Division, XXIII Corps, to November 1863. District of Nashville, Tennessee, Department of the Cumberland, to April 1864. 3rd Brigade, 3rd Division, Cavalry Corps, Army of the Cumberland, to October 1864. 1st Brigade, 3rd Division, Cavalry Corps, Military Division of Mississippi, to July 1865.

The 3rd Kentucky Cavalry mustered out of service on July 15, 1865.

== Detailed service ==
- Action at Woodbury, Kentucky, October 29; 1861. Brownsville, Kentucky, November 21. Sacramento December 28.
- Moved to Nashville, Tennessee, February 15-March 8, 1862, and to Savannah, Tennessee, March 18-April 6.
- Battle of Shiloh April 6–7. Advance on and siege of Corinth, Mississippi, April 29-May 30.
- Pursuit to Booneville May 31-June 12. Buell's Campaign in northern Alabama and middle Tennessee June to August. Columbia and Kinderhook August 11 (detachment). Mt. Pleasant August 14. March to Louisville, Kentucky, in pursuit of Bragg August 21-September 26. Munfordville, Kentucky, September 22. Ashbysburg September 25. New Haven September 29. Capture of 3rd Georgia Cavalry.
- Pursuit of Bragg into Kentucky October 1–22. Near Perryville October 6–7. Near Mountain Gap October 14 and 16. Expedition to Big Hill and Richmond October 21.
- March to Nashville, Tenn., October 25-November 7.
- Duty there until December 26. Reconnaissance to Franklin December 11–12. Wilson's Creek Pike December 11. Franklin December 12.
- Advance on Murfreesboro December 26–30. Lavergne December 26–27.
- Battle of Stones River December 30–31, 1862 and January 1–3, 1863. Overall's Creek and Wilkinson's Cross Roads December 31. Lytle's Creek, Manchester Pike, January 5, 1863.
- Expedition to Franklin January 31-February 13. Unionville and Rover January 31. Rover February 13.
- Ordered to Kentucky February.
- Duty at Hopkinsville and Russellville and in District of West Kentucky until December, 1863. Action at Russellville June 28. Pursuit of Morgan July 2–26. Buffington Island, Ohio, July 19. Near Volney October 22. Lafayette November 27 (detachment).
- Ordered to Nashville December 17. Smith's Expedition from Nashville, Tennessee, to Corinth, Mississippi, December 28, 1863, to January 18, 1864.
- Ringgold, Georgia, April 27. Reconnaissance from Ringgold, toward Tunnel Hill April 29. Atlanta Campaign May 1-September 8. Near Tunnel Hill and Ringgold Gap May 2. Near Nickajack Gap May 7. Near Resaca May 13. Battle of Resaca May 14–15. Calhoun May 15.
- Operations on line of Pumpkin Vine Creek and battles about Dallas, New Hope Church, and Allatoona Hills May 25-June 5.
- Operations about Marietta and against Kennesaw Mountain June 10-July 2. Assault on Kennesaw June 27.
- On line of the Chattahoochie River July 2–12. Adairsville July 7. Siege of Atlanta July 22-August 25.
- Expedition to Pickens County July. Fairburn and Sandtown August 15. Kilpatrick's Raid around Atlanta August 18–22. Lovejoy's Station August 20.
- Flank movement on Jonesboro August 25–30. Flint River Station August 30. Battle of Jonesboro August 31-September 1. Lovejoy's Station September 2–6.
- Operations against Hood in northern Georgia and northern Alabama September 29-November 3. Camp Creek and near Atlanta September 30. Sweetwater and Noyes Creek near Powder Springs October 1–3. Van Wert October 9–10. March to the sea November 15-December 10. East Macon November 20. Griswoldsville November 22. Sylvan Grove November 27. Waynesboro November 27–28. Near Waynesboro November 28.
- Near Louisville November 30. Millen or Shady Grove December 1. Rocky Creek Church December 2. Waynesboro December 4.
- Siege of Savannah December 10–21. Campaign of the Carolinas January to April, 1865. Blacksville, South Carolina, February 7. Williston February 8. Johnston's Station February 10. About Columbia February 15–17. Lancaster February 27. Phillips' Cross Roads, North Carolina, March 4.
- Rockingham March 7. Monroe's Cross Roads March 10. Averysboro, Taylor's Hole Creek March 16. Battle of Bentonville March 19–21. Occupation of Goldsboro March 24.
- Morrisville and occupation of Raleigh April 13. Chapel Hill April 15. Bennett's House April 26.
- Surrender of Johnston and his army.
- Duty at Lexington, North Carolina, and in the Department of North Carolina until July.

== Casualties ==
The regiment lost a total of 215 men during service; 3 officers and 41 enlisted men killed or mortally wounded, 3 officers and 168 enlisted men died of disease.

== Commanders ==
- Colonel James Streshly Jackson
- Colonel Eli Houston Murray

== See also ==
- List of Kentucky Civil War Units
- Kentucky in the Civil War
