= Theistic rationalism =

Hybrid of natural religion, Christianity, and rationalism

Theistic rationalism is a hybrid of natural religion, Christianity, and rationalism, in which rationalism is the predominant element. According to Henry Clarence Thiessen, the concept of theistic rationalism first developed during the eighteenth century as a form of English and German Deism. The term "theistic rationalism" occurs as early as 1856, in the English translation of a German work on recent religious history. Some scholars have argued that the term properly describes the beliefs of some of the prominent Founding Fathers of the United States, including George Washington, John Adams, Benjamin Franklin, James Wilson, and Thomas Jefferson.

== Definition ==
Theistic rationalists believe natural religion, Christianity, and rationalism typically coexist compatibly, with rational thought balancing the conflicts between the first two aspects. They often assert that the primary role of a person's religion should be to bolster morality, a fixture of daily life.

Theistic rationalists believe that God plays an active role in human life, rendering prayer effective. They accept parts of the Bible as divinely inspired, using reason as their criterion for what to accept or reject. Their belief that God intervenes in human affairs and their approving attitude toward parts of the Bible distinguish theistic rationalists from Deists.

Anthony Ashley-Cooper, 3rd Earl of Shaftesbury (1671–1713), has been described by professor of history Gregg L. Frazer as an early theistic rationalist. According to Stanley Grean,

Both Shaftesbury and the Deists wanted to preserve theology while freeing it from supernaturalism; both denied the occurrence of miracles; both called for free criticism of the Bible and questioned the absoluteness of its authority; both shared a distrust of sacramental and priestly religion; and both stressed the importance of morality in religion. However, despite this broad area of agreement, Shaftesbury did not identify himself unreservedly with the developing Deistic movement, and he expressed some serious doubts about certain aspects of it... The Deists were wrong if they relegated God to the status of a Prime Mover without subsequent contact with the universe; Deity must be conceived as being in constant and living interaction with the creation; otherwise the concept is "dry and barren."
