= Arthur Lloyd Thomas =

American politician

Arthur L. Thomas
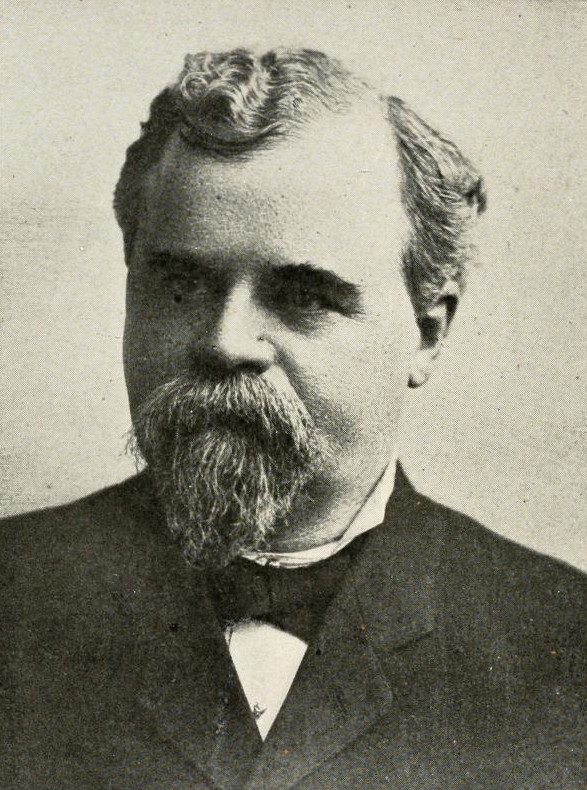

14th Governor of Utah Territory
- In office May 6, 1889 – May 9, 1893
- President: Benjamin Harrison
- Preceded by: Caleb Walton West
- Succeeded by: Caleb Walton West

Personal details
- Born: August 22, 1851 Chicago, Illinois, U.S.
- Died: September 15, 1924 (aged 73)

Arthur Lloyd Thomas (August 22, 1851 – September 15, 1924) was the governor of the Utah Territory from 1889 to 1893.

== Biography ==
Born in Chicago, Illinois, Thomas grew up in Pittsburgh, Pennsylvania.

Thomas was a staffer for US Representative James S. Negley of Pennsylvania; he came to Utah in 1879, upon his appointment as secretary of Utah Territory by US President Hayes. His nomination for that position was confirmed by the US Senate in April of that year.

Thomas ran unsuccessfully in the 1895 election of Utah's first governor, held immediately ahead of the territory achieving statehood in 1896. He was appointed postmaster of Salt Lake City by US President McKinley in 1898, a position he held until 1914.

Political offices
Preceded by Caleb Walton West	Governor of Utah Territory; 1889–1893	Succeeded by Caleb Walton West
Preceded by Levi P. Luckey	Secretary of Utah Territory; 1879–1887	Succeeded by William C. Hall
