= Edwin Gaustad =

American historian (1923–2011)

- Born: November 14, 1923; Rowley, Iowa
- Died: March 25, 2011 (aged 87); Santa Fe, New Mexico
- Citizenship: United States
- Education: Baylor University (B.A., History, 1947) Brown University (M.A., History of Religions, 1948) Brown University (Ph.D., History of Religions, 1951)
- Occupation: Historian
- Known for: History of Religion in the United States
- Notable work: The Great Awakening in New England (1957), Dissent in American Religion (1973), Liberty of Conscience: Roger Williams in America (1991, 1999), Sworn on the Altar of God: A Religious Biography of Thomas Jefferson (1996), Historical Atlas of Religion in America (1962, 1976), New Historical Atlas of Religion in America (2001)
- Awards: President of the American Society of Church History (1978) Member of Phi Beta Kappa West Coast Speakers Panel (1986–1992); Distinguished Alumni Award, Baylor University (1978); Distinguished Alumni Award, Brown university (1989); Distinguished Teaching Award, University of California, Riverside (1984); Faculty Research Scholar University of California, Riverside (1986); Eminent Scholar in Religion, Auburn University (1993); Alumni Religious Liberty Award, Baylor University (2004) Baptist History and Heritage Society Distinguished Service Award (2008)

Edwin Scott Gaustad (November 14, 1923 – March 25, 2011) was a professor of history at the University of California, Riverside. He achieved fame with his study of the genealogy of religion in the United States, Historical atlas of religion in America. The 1972 edition of this work has been used in secular histories of Mainline Protestantism and the Emergent church movement (denominationalism) for decades, and his a Religious History of America was a standard text for college students. A graduate of Baylor University and Brown University, Gaustad dedicated his career to sharing his expansive research on religious history. Gaustad was president of the American Society of Church History. Gaustad died March 25, 2011, in Santa Fe, New Mexico at the age of 87.

== Life ==
Gaustad was born in Rowley, Iowa, but grew up in Houston, Texas. During the Second World War Gaustad served as a 1st lieutenant in the Army Air Corps. From 1943 to 1945 he served in Italy as a bombardier and navigator on over 30 missions. Gaustad graduated from Baylor University in 1947 with a BA in history. In 1951, he went on to complete a PhD in religious studies at Brown University, concentrating on the history of religions. At Brown, Gaustad studied under Edmund Morgan, a historian of colonial America. Gaustad taught at Brown as an associate professor, before going on to Shorter College (1953–1957), University of Redlands (1957–1965), and finally University of California at Riverside (until his retirement in 1989). After his retirement, Gaustad became a professor emeritus at UC Riverside and a visiting professor at Baylor (1978), University of Richmond (1987), Princeton Seminary (1991–92), and Auburn University (1993).

== Career ==
Gaustad's first book was The Great Awakening in New England, published in 1957. In it he argued that the Great Awakening of Jonathan Edwards and George Whitfield was more than a religious phenomenon, impacting politics and intellectual life in America.

A running theme in Gaustad's scholarship was religious dissent in America. Touching on this subject, Gaustad wrote several biographies on significant figures including Roger Williams, George Berkeley, Thomas Jefferson, and Benjamin Franklin. In addition to his biographies, Gaustad wrote several histories of religion in America, including Dissent in American Religion (1973), Faith of Our Fathers: Religion and the New Nation (1987), and A Religious History of America (2002). One of his most impressive projects was the Historical Atlas of Religion in America, published in 1962, 1976, and again in 2001.

In addition to his academic labors, Gaustad was also politically active on occasion. In the late 1980s, Gaustad joined expert witnesses from the landmark libel case Lee v. Duddy in publishing their testimonies. Gaustad himself was not asked to testify at the trial, but wrote the essay that concluded compilation, to which John Gordon Melton, John Albert Saliba, Eugene Van Ness Goetchius, Rodney Stark, and H. Newton Malony contributed. In his concluding essay, Gaustad defended the American tradition of the local church, remarking that

The history of Christianity is replete with examples of those groups who, especially in their early years, manifest a zealous assurance and unique strength that seems strikingly different from the casual or inherited religious affiliation all around them. To persecute this zeal is to rob Christianity of the reforming impetus that it has always required... From my observation, I conclude that the Local Church stands in the tradition of evangelical Christianity, of the Protestant emphasis on biblical authority, of the great Christian mystics’ and pietists’ concern for the inner life, of the millennia-old expectation of a New Age, and of born-again, experiential religion. They meet together, pray together, sing and study together, and grow together. They labor to be loyal to their particular vision of the Christian life. It seems enough. It also sounds very much like the free exercise of religion.

In 1998, he publicly opposed Rep. Ernest Istook's proposed constitutional amendment to permit forms of government-sponsored prayer and tax-financed religious activities. Gaustad came up with the slogan "Istook is Mistook," a phrase that would become popular in the campaign against the amendment.

Gaustad also served as an expert witness in 2002 for the Federal court case Glassroth v. Moore, which concerned the placement of a stone Ten Commandments monument in the rotunda of the Heflin-Torbert Judicial Building in Montgomery, Alabama. In his testimony, Gaustad referenced Thomas Jefferson's "undying anxiety of anything that would bring church and state together." Gaustad concluded that moving the monument from the courthouse to private property According to Americans United for the Separation of Church and State, his testimony was significant for their case against Moore.

== Beliefs ==
Gaustad was a prolific writer that believed in the separation of church and state education. However, he still thought that both were important, even saying that the Great Awakening not only helped religion, but also helped the thought process in America. He is quoted to have said that "Religion involves both the heart and the mind. Education, likewise, involves both the heart and the mind." He believed that education and religion were wonderful things—just not when one puts them together.

== Legacy ==
=== Religious dissent ===
According to the Baptist History & Heritage Society, Gaustad's work influenced "a new generation of baptist historians."

At a time when many Baptists in America turned their backs on their denomination’s freedom legacy, Gaustad clearly and consistently articulated Baptists’ historical foundations of religious liberty and church/state separation. Gaustad reminded Baptists and the world that the American commitment to religious liberty and church/state separation enshrined in the First Amendment was first articulated and put into practice by Roger Williams and other early Baptists. He dedicated his voice and pen to the preservation of the best of Baptist principles, and demonstrated time and timeagain that American history cannot be fully understood apart from inclusion of the religious dimension of the American story.

Throughout his scholarship, Gaustad sought to remind Americans that understanding religious dissent is necessary both for understanding and for living the America's religious experience. In Dissent in American Religion, Gaustad wrote that "In the first century, amidst a plethora of fresh dissent, the sober counsel was 'Test everything; hold fast what is good.' It is sober counsel for every century, and every generation." Moreover, he strove to communicate the lesson learned from Thomas Jefferson, that, "Americans need to be so bound together, bound by sentiment and hope, by values and civility--bound by something more than a network of interstate highways."

Gaustad is remembered as one of the foremost historians of religion in America, but his friends and colleagues noted that he was also "a gracious scholar, always taking time to help others—which is the mark of a truly great man.”

== Baylor Influence ==
Gaustad held a lifelong love for Baylor University and often taught there as a visiting professor. On several occasions, he also lectured for the J.M. Dawson Institute of Church-State Studies. His friends and colleagues remembered him as a humble, unassuming man. When he died he left his scholarly library and personal papers to Baylor's Central Libraries Special Collections. The collection is housed in Moody Library as a scholar's collection. Most of the books in his collection pertain to church history and American history, and his personal papers include manuscripts, correspondence, and his research notes. These papers will remain sealed until 2022.

== Bibliography ==
=== Books authored ===
- America’s Institutions of Faith. Boston, MA: Beacon Press, 1968.
- American Religion: 1974 Proceedings of the American Academy of Religion. Missoula, MT: Scholars Press, University of Montana, 1974. Preprinted Papers. Tallahassee: American Academy of Religion, 1974.
- American Religious History. Washington, D.C.: Service Center for Teachers of History, 1967.
- The American West as Religious Region. Salt Lake City, UT: University of Utah, 1996.
- Baptist Piety: The Last Will & Testament of Obadiah Holmes. Grand Rapids, MI: Christian College Consortium, 1978. New York, NY: Arno Press, 1980. Tuscaloosa: University of Alabama Press, 2005.
- Baptists, the Bible, Church Order and the Churches. Essays from Foundations, a Baptist Journal of History and Theology. New York, NY: Arno Press, 1980.
- Barbarians and Memory. Waco, TX: J. M. Dawson Studies of Church and State, Baylor University, 1995.
- Benjamin Franklin. Lives and Legacies. New York, NY: Oxford University Press, 2006, 2008.
- Benjamin Franklin: Inventing America. Oxford Portraits. New York, NY: Oxford University Press, 2004.
- Charles Chauncy and the Great Awakening: A Survey and Bibliography. Bibliographical Society of America, 1951.
- Church and State in America. Religion in American Life. New York, NY: Oxford University Press, 1999, 2003.
- Church and State Re-examined: A Baptist View. Waco, TX: J. M. Dawson Studies in Church and State, Baylor University, 1962.
- Church, State, and Education in Historical Perspective. Waco, TX: J. M. Dawson Studies in Church and State, Baylor University, 1984.
- Churches of Christ in America. Boston, MA: Beacon Press, 1983.
- “Confusing Your Enemy and Confounding Those That Persecute You.” Macon, GA.: National Association of Baptist Professors of Religion, 1982.
- Consensus in America: The Churches’ Changing Role. Atlanta, GA: American Academy of Religion, 1968.
- Did the Fundamentalists Win? Boston, MA: Beacon Press, 1983.
- A Disestablished Society: Origins of the First Amendment. Waco, TX: J. M. Dawson Studies in Church and State, Baylor University, 1969.
- Dissent in American Religion. Chicago History of American Religion. Chicago, IL: University of Chicago Press, 1973, 2006.
- A Documentary History of Religion in America: To the Civil War. Grand Rapids, MI: Eerdmans, 1982.
- A Documentary History of Religion in America: Since 1865. Grand Rapids, MI: Eerdmans, 1983.
- Gaustad, Edwin S., and Mark Noll. A Documentary History of Religion in America: To 1877. Grand Rapids, MI: Eerdmans, 2003.
- Gaustad, Edwin S., and Mark Noll. A Documentary History of Religion in America: Since 1877. Grand Rapids, MI: Eerdmans, 2003.
- Doing Church History – Your Own! Valley Forge, PA: American Baptist Historical Society, 1991.
- Ecclesiastical Cartography in America. Waco, TX: Baylor University Press, 1964.
- Faith of Our Fathers: Religion and the New Nation. San Francisco, CA: Harper & Row, 1987.
- Faith of the Founders: Religion and the New Nation, 1776−1826. Waco, TX: Baylor University Press, 2004, 2011.
- The Geography of American Religion. Somerville, NJ: National Association of Biblical Instructors, 1962.
- George Berkeley in America. New Haven, CT: Yale University Press, 1979, 2009.
- The Great Awakening in New England. New York, NY: Harper & Brothers, 1957. Gloucester, Mass.: Peter Smith, 1965. Chicago: Quadrangle, 1968
- Historical Atlas of Religion in America. New York, NY: Harper & Row, 1962, 1976.
- Gaustad, Edwin S., Philip L. Barlow, and Richard W. Dishno. New Historical Atlas of Religion in America. New York, NY: Oxford University Press, 2001.
- Historical Theology and Theological History: Mormon Possibilities. Ogden, UT: Mormon History Association, 1984.
- Liberty of Conscience: Roger Williams in America. Grand Rapids, MI: Eerdmans, 1991. Valley Forge, Pa.: Judson Press, 1999.
- Memoirs of the Spirit. Grand Rapids, MI: Eerdmans, 1999.
- Memoirs of the Spirit: American Religious Autobiography from Jonathan Edwards to Maya Angelou. Grand Rapids, MI: Eerdmans, 2001.
- Neither King nor Prelate: Religion and the New Nation, 1776−1826. Grand Rapids, MI: Eerdmans, 1993.
- North and South in American Religious History: Baptists and Beyond. Louisville, KY: Southern Baptist Theological Seminary, 1995.
- On Jeffersonian Liberty. Riverside, CA: Academic Senate (University of California, Riverside), 1985.
- Proclaim Liberty Throughout All the Land: A History of Church and State in America. New York, NY: Oxford University Press, 1999, 2003.
- Religion in America: Early Books and Manuscripts. Ann Arbor, MI: University Microfilms International, 1976.
- Religion in America: History and Historiography. AHA pamphlet 260. Washington, D.C.: American Historical Association, 1973.
- Religion, the Constitution, and the Founding Fathers. Rome, GA: Shorter College, 1987.
- A Religious History of America. New York, NY: Harper & Row, 1966, 1974, 1990.
- Gaustad, Edwin S., and Leigh Schmidt. The Religious History of America: The Heart of the American Story from Colonial Times to Today. San Francisco, CA: HarperSanFrancisco, 2002, 2004, 2007.
- Religious Issues in American History. New York, NY: Harper & Row, 1968.
- Restitution, Revolution, and the American Dream. Missoula, MT: American Academy of Religion, 1976.
- Revival, Revolution, and Religion in Early Virginia. Foundations of America. Williamsburg, VA: Colonial Williamsburg Foundation, 1994.
- The Rise of Adventism: Religion and Society in Mid-Nineteenth-Century America. New York, NY: Harper & Row, 1974.
- Roger Williams. Lives and Legacies. New York, NY: Oxford University Press, 2005.
- Roger Williams: Prophet of Liberty. Oxford Portraits. New York, NY: Oxford University Press, 2001.
- Society and the Great Awakening in New England. Bobbs-Merrill Reprint Series in History H-83. Indianapolis, IN: Bobbs-Merrill, 1954. William and Mary Quarterly, 3rd series, 11, 1954 (pp. 566–77).
- Sworn on the Altar of God: A Religious Biography of Thomas Jefferson. Library of Religious Biography. Grand Rapids, MI: Eerdmans, 1996.
- Teaching About Religion in the Public Schools: New Ventures in Public Education. Waco, TX: J. M. Dawson Studies in Church and State, Baylor University, 1969.
- The Theological Effects of the Great Awakening in New England. Cedar Rapids, IA: Mississippi Valley Historical Association, 1954.

=== Books coauthored ===
- Carner, Vern, Sakae Kubo, Curt Rice, and Edwin S. Gaustad. The Rise of Adventism: Religion and Society in Mid-Nineteenth-Century America. Bibliographical Essay. New York, NY: Harper & Row, 1974.
- The Experts Speak Concerning Witness Lee and the Local Churches: The Testimony of J. Gordon Melton, John A. Saliba, Eugene Van Ness Goetchius, Rodney Stark, H. Newton Malony, Edwin S. Gaustad. Anaheim, CA: Living Stream Ministry, 1995.
- Gaustad, Edwin S., and Vern Carner. Religion in America: A Preliminary Author-Title List of Selected Primary and Secondary Source Materials on 35mm Roll Microfilm. General Collection, Early Books and Manuscripts. Based on a New Bibliography by Edwin S. Gaustad and Vern Carner. Ann Arbor, MI: University Microfilms International, 1975.
- —–. Religion in America: An Annotated Bibliography of Selected Dissertations. Ann Arbor, MI: University Microfilms International, 1976.
- —–. Religion in America: Early Books and Manuscripts. An Annotated Bibliography and Guide to the Microfilm Collection. Ann Arbor, MI: University Microfilms International, 1976.
- Gaustad, Edwin S., and Derek Davis. The Baptist Tradition of Religious Liberty in America: Two Lectures by Edwin Scott Gaustad. Waco, TX: J. M. Dawson Institute of Church-State Studies, Baylor University, 1995.
- Gaustad, Edwin S., and Walter J. Harrelson. The Bible in American Culture. Philadelphia, PA: Fortress Press, 1982.
- Gaustad, Edwin S., Darline Miller, and G. A. Stokes. Religion in America. Philadelphia, PA: American Studies Association, 1979.
- Gaustad, Edwin S., Robert A. Spivey, and Rodney F. Allen, eds. Religious Freedom in America: Study Outline for the Sourcebook. New York, NY: Friendship Press, 1974.
- Gaustad, Edwin S., and John Tremblay. Religion in America: 1950. Map prepared by John Tremblay. New York, NY: Harper & Row, 1962.
- Groves, Richard, ed. The Bloudy Tenent of Persecution for Cause of Conscience. Introduction by Edwin Gaustad. Classics of Religious Liberty 2. Macon, GA: Mercer University Press, 2001.
- Harrell, David E., and Edwin S. Gaustad. White Sects and Black Men in the Recent South. Nashville, TN: Vanderbilt University Press, 1971.
- Harrell, David E., Edwin S. Gaustad, John B. Boles, Sally F. Griffith, Randall M. Miller, and Randall B. Woods. Unto a Good Land: A History of the American People. Grand Rapids, MI: Eerdmans, 2005.
- Maring, Norman H., Robert G. Torbet, Winthrop S. Hudson, Norman A. Baxter, Edwin S. Gaustad, Norman H. Maring, Francis G. Nelson, Robert T. Handy, and John Leland. Historical Papers on Baptist Tradition in Preparation for the Second National Theological Conference, American Baptist Assembly, Green Lake, Wisconsin, July 6−11, 1959. New York, NY: Department of Theological Education, 1959.
- Moore, R. L., Edwin S. Gaustad, and Gene Wise. Insiders and Outsiders in American Historical Narrative and American History. Washington, D.C.: American Historical Association, 1982.
- Spivey, Robert A., Edwin S. Gaustad, and Rodney F. Allen. Issues in Religion. Menlo Park, CA: Addison-Wesley, 1972.
- —–. Pathways to Pluralism: Religious Issues in American Culture. Menlo Park, CA: Addison-Wesley, 1990. Teachers’ Guide (with Lawrence R. Hepburn), 1990.
- —–. Religious Issues in American Culture. Issues in Religion. Menlo Park, CA: Addison-Wesley, 1972. Teachers’ Guide, 1972.
- —–. Religious Issues in Western Civilization. Issues in Religion. Menlo Park, CA: Addison-Wesley, 1973. Teachers’ Guide, 1973.
- —–. Religious Issues in World Cultures. Menlo Park, CA: Addison-Wesley, 1976. Teachers’ Guide, 1976.
- Walker, Williston, and Edwin S. Gaustad. Ten New England Leaders. New York, NY: Arno Press, 1969.
- Williams, Roger. The Complete Writings of Roger Williams. Paris, AR: Baptist Standard Bearer, 2005.

=== Festschrift ===
- Leonard, Bill J. Protestant, Catholic, Jew, Muslim, Atheist: Essays in Honor of Edwin Scott Gaustad. James M. Dunn, C. Douglas Weaver, Robert N. Nash Jr., Melissa Rogers, Brad R. Braxton, Bill J. Leonard, Leigh Eric Schmidt. Perspectives in Religious Studies (Summer 2011), vol. 38, no. 2. National Association of Baptist Professors of Religion.
