= Pennsylvania State Game Lands Number 314 =

Hunting grounds in the United States

- Location within Pennsylvania Location within the United States
- Location: Erie County
- Nearest town: East Springfield
- Coordinates: 41.974101°N 80.493815°W
- Area: 3,564.9 acres (1,442.7 ha)
- Owner: Pennsylvania Game Commission
- Website: www.pgc.pa.gov/HuntTrap/StateGameLands/Documents/SGL%20Maps/SGL__314.pdf

The Pennsylvania State Game Lands Number 314 are Pennsylvania State Game Lands in Erie County in Pennsylvania in the United States primarily used for deer, turkey, fox, squirrel, gray squirrel, and American woodcock hunting. The park is bordered on its western edge by Ohio and on the north by Lake Erie.

== Background ==
The land originally was originally owned by U.S. Steel before being acquired by the Western Pennsylvania Conservancy in 1989 and then turned over to the Commonwealth of Pennsylvania in 1991 to be managed by the Pennsylvania Game Commission. Established as the Roderick Wildlife Reserve, it was designated for hiking, fishing, cross-country skiing and walking along the beach.

The hunting mostly commonly done at the Game Lands is for deer, turkey, fox, squirrel, gray squirrel, and American woodcock. There are also those who hunt rabbit and ring-necked pheasant. Additionally, there is an opportunity for dog hunting with coyote in the park. According to the PA Game Commission, the hunting of crows in the park has been controversial. This activity has been controversial due to crow hunters not cleaning up their kill properly.

The David M. Roderick Reserve, which sits adjacent to Erie Bluffs State Park is a 3,600 acres (1,500 ha) wildlife reserve on the Erie shoreline. It was sold to the Pennsylvania Game Commission, and is named after former U.S. Steel CEO David M. Roderick.

== See also ==
- Erie Bluffs State Park
- Erie Triangle
