= Fallingwater =

House in Stewart Township, Pennsylvania

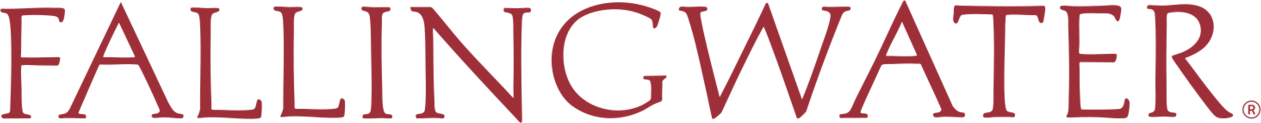

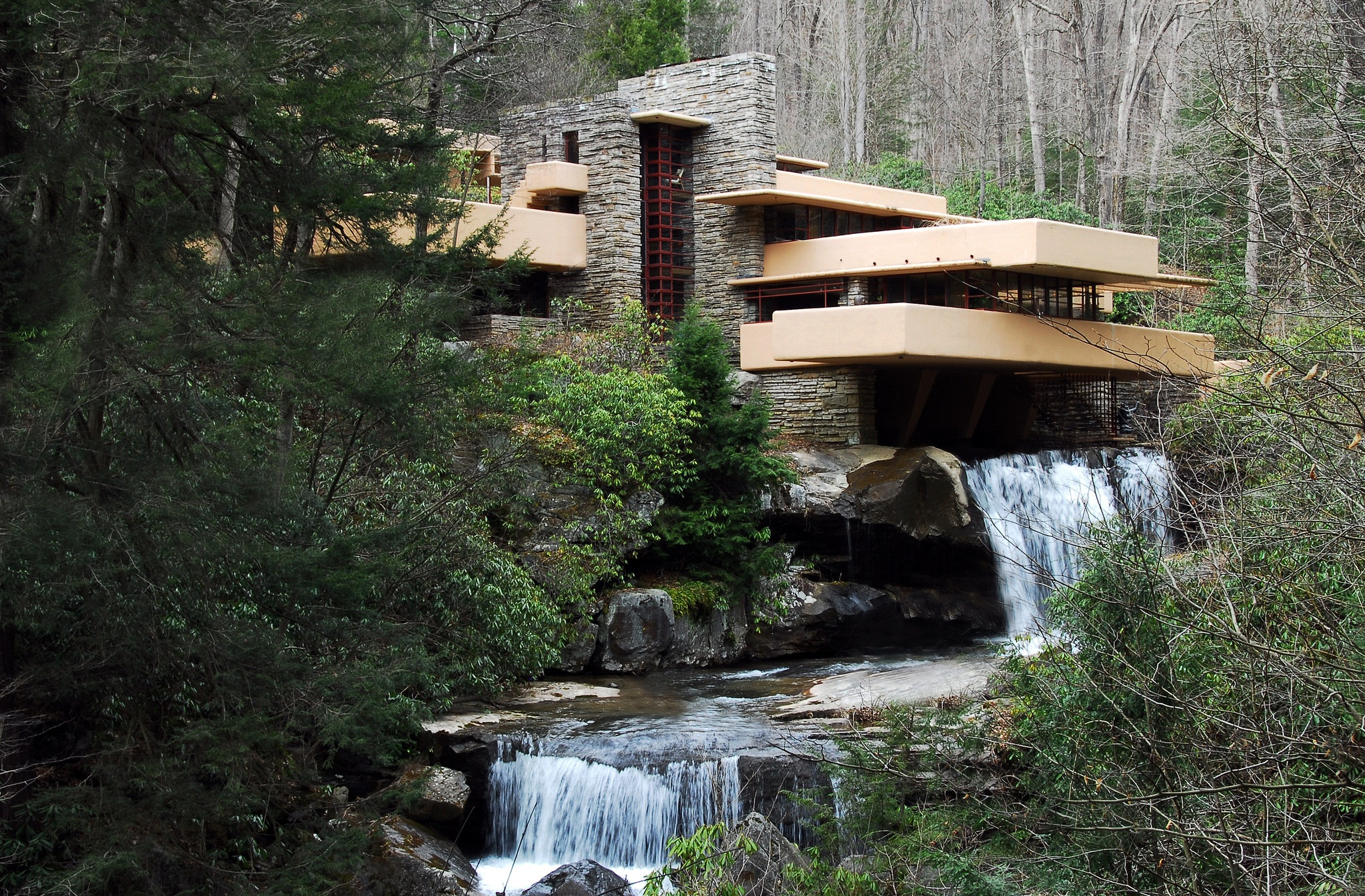
- Fallingwater in 2017

- Location within Pennsylvania Location within the United States

General information
- Status: Completed
- Type: House museum
- Architectural style: Modern, organic architecture
- Location: Stewart Township, Fayette County, Pennsylvania, U.S., near Uniontown
- Coordinates: 39°54′23″N 79°28′04″W
- Construction started: 1936
- Completed: 1937 (main house); 1939 (guest house)
- Owner: Western Pennsylvania Conservancy

Design and construction
- Architect: Frank Lloyd Wright

Website
- fallingwater.org

UNESCO World Heritage Site
- Criteria: Cultural: (ii)
- Designated: 2019 (43rd session)
- Part of: The 20th-Century Architecture of Frank Lloyd Wright
- Reference no.: 1496-005
- Region: North America

U.S. National Register of Historic Places
- Designated: July 23, 1974
- Reference no.: 74001781

U.S. National Historic Landmark
- Designated: May 23, 1976

Pennsylvania Historical Marker
- Designated: May 15, 1994
- Reference no.: 1994HM00020

Fallingwater is a house museum in Stewart Township in the Laurel Highlands of southwestern Pennsylvania, United States. Designed by the architect Frank Lloyd Wright, it is built partly over a waterfall on the Bear Run stream. The three-story residence was developed as a weekend retreat for Edgar J. Kaufmann Sr., the owner of Kaufmann's Department Store in Pittsburgh, and his wife Liliane. The Western Pennsylvania Conservancy (WPC), which has operated Fallingwater as a tourist attraction since 1963, maintains 5,000 acres (2,000 ha) surrounding the house.

Edgar Kaufmann Sr. had established a summer retreat at Bear Run for his employees by 1916. When employees stopped using the retreat, the Kaufmanns bought the site in July 1933 and hired Wright to design the house in 1934. Several structural issues arose during the house's construction, including cracked concrete and sagging terraces. The Kaufmanns began using the house in 1937 and hired Wright to design a guest wing, which was finished in 1939. Edgar Kaufmann Jr., the Kaufmanns' son, continued to use the house after his parents' deaths. After the WPC took over, it began hosting tours of the house in July 1964 and built a visitor center in 1979. The house was renovated in the late 1990s and early 2000s to remedy severe structural defects, including sagging terraces and poor drainage.

The house includes multiple outdoor terraces, which are cantilevered, extending outward from a chimney without support at the opposite end. Fallingwater is made of locally–quarried stone, reinforced concrete, steel, and plate glass. The interior spans 5,330 square feet (495 m^{2}), with the main entrance, the living room, two outdoor terraces, and the kitchen on the first story. There are four bedrooms (including a study) and additional terraces on the upper stories. Wright designed most of the house's built-in furniture. Many pieces of art are placed throughout the house, in addition to objects including textiles and Tiffany glass. Above the main house is a guest wing with a carport and servants' quarters.

Fallingwater has received extensive architectural commentary over the years and it was one of the world's most discussed modern–style structures by the 1960s. The house has been the subject of books, magazine articles, films, and other media works over the years. Fallingwater is designated as a National Historic Landmark, and it is one of eight buildings in "The 20th-Century Architecture of Frank Lloyd Wright", a World Heritage Site.

== Site ==
Fallingwater is situated in Stewart Township in the Laurel Highlands of southwestern Pennsylvania, United States, about 72 miles (116 km) southeast of Pittsburgh. The house is located near Pennsylvania Route 381 (PA 381), between the communities of Ohiopyle and Mill Run in Fayette County. It is variously cited as being either in Bear Run, the stream that runs below the house, or in Mill Run, though the building's deeds give the locale as Stewart Township. Nearby are the Bear Run Natural Area to the north, as well as Ohiopyle State Park and Fort Necessity National Battlefield to the south. The nearest city is Uniontown, to the west. Fallingwater is one of four buildings in southwestern Pennsylvania designed by the architect Frank Lloyd Wright. The others are Kentuck Knob, about a 7-mile (11 km) drive to the southwest, (Note: Geographically, Kentuck Knob is 4 miles (6.4 km) away.) as well as Duncan House and Lindholm House at Polymath Park in Acme, Pennsylvania.

=== Geography and structures ===
Fallingwater is named for the location of the main house, which is oriented roughly south-southeast. It sits above the Bear Run stream, a tributary of the Youghiogheny River, which has an upper falls about 20–30 feet (6.1–9.1 m) high (where the main house is situated) and a lower falls about 7–10 feet (2.1–3.0 m) high. At the house, Bear Run is 1,298 feet (396 m) above sea level; contrary to common perceptions, it does not pass through the house. The stream sometimes freezes during the winter and dries up during the summer. There is a layer of buff and gray sandstone under the site, which is part of the Pottsville Formation. Prior to Fallingwater's construction, several sandstone boulders were scattered across the grounds. In contrast to other country estates, Fallingwater is not located on a geographically prominent site and is not easily visible. Canopy cover from the surrounding forest hangs above the house.

Atop a hill to the north of the main house is Fallingwater's guest wing, which is about 90 feet (27 m) away from the main house. The guest wing, an "L"-shaped building, is connected to the main house by a curved outdoor walkway (see § Guest wing). The house's visitor pavilion, which is not visible from the main house, includes five open-air wooden structures with connecting pathways. The pavilion includes glass-walled wings with bathrooms, exhibit areas, and a child-care center, in addition to an open-air ticket office. Approximately 0.25 miles (0.40 km) from the main house is the Barn at Fallingwater, which consists of two barns built c. 1870 and in the early 1940s.

The grounds include a small mausoleum for Edgar and Liliane Kaufmann, which has doors designed by Alberto Giacometti. Edgar Jr. was cremated after his death, and his ashes are spread around the house. There are paths throughout the grounds, including a pathway to the waterfall. Wright designed a set of gates for the house's driveway, though these were never installed. George Longenecker designed a gate that was used at Fallingwater from 1995 to 2005; it weighed 1,700 pounds (770 kg) and measured 5 by 18 feet (1.5 by 5.5 m) across. Wright also designed several unbuilt structures for the estate, including a gatehouse, farmhouse, and various expansions.

Fallingwater
1 Main house
2 Guest wing
3 Visitor center
4 Estate entrance
5 The Barn at Fallingwater

=== Previous site usage ===
In the 1890s, a freemasonry group from Pittsburgh developed a country club on a plot of land that includes the Fallingwater site. By 1909, this clubhouse had been acquired by another group of masons who turned it into the Syria Country Club. The club went bankrupt in 1913. A map from that year shows that the grounds included the clubhouse, the Baltimore and Ohio Railroad's Bear Run station, and 13 other buildings (none of which are extant). One of the structures was a cottage on the site of Fallingwater's guest wing, while the clubhouse was about 1,100 feet (340 m) to the southeast.

Edgar J. Kaufmann Sr., the president of Kaufmann's Department Store in Pittsburgh, had established a summer retreat at Bear Run for his employees by 1916. Up to one thousand employees used the retreat each summer. In 1922, Edgar and his wife Liliane built a simple summer cabin on a nearby cliff, which was nicknamed the "Hangover" and lacked electricity, plumbing, or heating. The Kaufmanns' permanent residence, at the time, was La Tourelle in Fox Chapel. Kaufmann's employees eventually bought the Bear Run site in 1926, and the Hangover was expanded in 1931. After Kaufmann's Department Store employees stopped using the summer retreat, the Kaufmann family bought the site in July 1933.

== Development ==
Edgar and Liliane Kaufmann became familiar with Wright's work through their only child, Edgar Kaufmann Jr.. (Note: The younger Edgar spelled the "jr." in his name with lowercase letters. For consistency, this article refers to him as Edgar Kaufmann Jr.) The younger Edgar had studied in Europe under the artist Victor Hammer from 1930 to 1933. After returning to the United States, in September 1934, Edgar Jr. traveled to Wright's Wisconsin studio, Taliesin, and began apprenticing under Wright. Edgar Jr.'s parents met with Wright that November while visiting their son. (Note: Sources disagree on whether this was when Edgar Jr.'s parents first met Wright. Toker 2003, p. 122, says that Edgar Sr. was already considering hiring Wright for various projects when Edgar Jr. started his apprenticeship. Waggoner 2011, p. 178, says that Toker's claim is contradicted by the Kaufmann family letters and that Edgar Jr. went to Taliesin of his own accord.) The architectural historian Paul Goldberger credits Edgar Jr. as the second-most influential figure in Fallingwater's development, behind Wright himself.

=== Planning ===
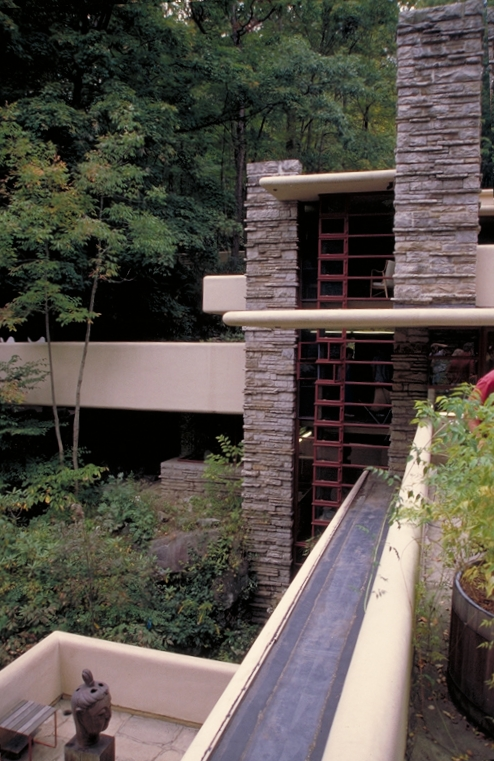
Fallingwater's facade includes sandstone, reinforced concrete, metal, and glass.

Fallingwater was one of three major buildings that Frank Lloyd Wright designed in the 1930s, along with the Johnson Wax Building in Racine, Wisconsin, and Herbert Jacobs's first house in Madison, Wisconsin. When Wright was hired as Fallingwater's architect in late 1934, he was 67 years old, and he had designed only two buildings in six years. Wright wanted to select a site "that has features making for character", and Edgar Jr. recalled that when Wright visited Bear Run, he had been excited by the landscape he had seen. The Kaufmanns wanted Wright to design a building set far back from the road. In late December 1934, Wright visited Bear Run and asked for a survey of the area around the waterfall. His team drew up models of the house and site in Arizona, and Wright asked the Kaufmanns to list every tree species on the site. A map of the site's boulders, trees, and topography was completed and forwarded to Wright on March 9, 1935.

The Kaufmanns asked Wright to include a large living–dining space, at least three bedrooms, a dressing room, and a guest and servant wing. Edgar Sr. wanted to pay between $20,000 and $30,000 for construction. Wright's apprentices Edgar Tafel and Robert Mosher were the most heavily involved in the building's design, while his employees Mendel Glickman and William Wesley Peters were the structural engineers. Wright postponed his sketches for Kaufmann's country home while designing another project for Kaufmann. Concurrently, Wright continued to formulate plans for the house's orientation, materials, and general shape and size. Edgar Sr. called Wright on September 22, 1935, to inform the architect that he would visit Taliesin. Wright's apprentices disagree on what exactly happened next, but the sketches were complete when Edgar Sr. arrived two hours later. Contrary to common claims that Wright had ignored the design for nine months before hurriedly sketching it, he had already devised the plans mentally and had written about them to Edgar Sr. multiple times.

Wright's plan called for a structure with exposed cantilevers. The house was to be placed on Bear Run's northern bank, oriented 30 degrees counterclockwise from due south, so that every room would receive natural light. It also included terraces that resembled rock ledges. Edgar Sr. had expected that the house would be downstream from Bear Run's waterfalls, allowing the Kaufmann family to see the cascades. This meant that the house would have faced north, with suboptimal amounts of natural light, so Wright instead designed the home above the waterfall. As he explained to Edgar Sr.: "I want you to live with the waterfall, not to look at it." Wright sent preliminary plans to Edgar Sr. for approval on October 15, 1935, after which Wright visited the site again. The Kaufmanns were impressed with the design, which Wright continued to work on.

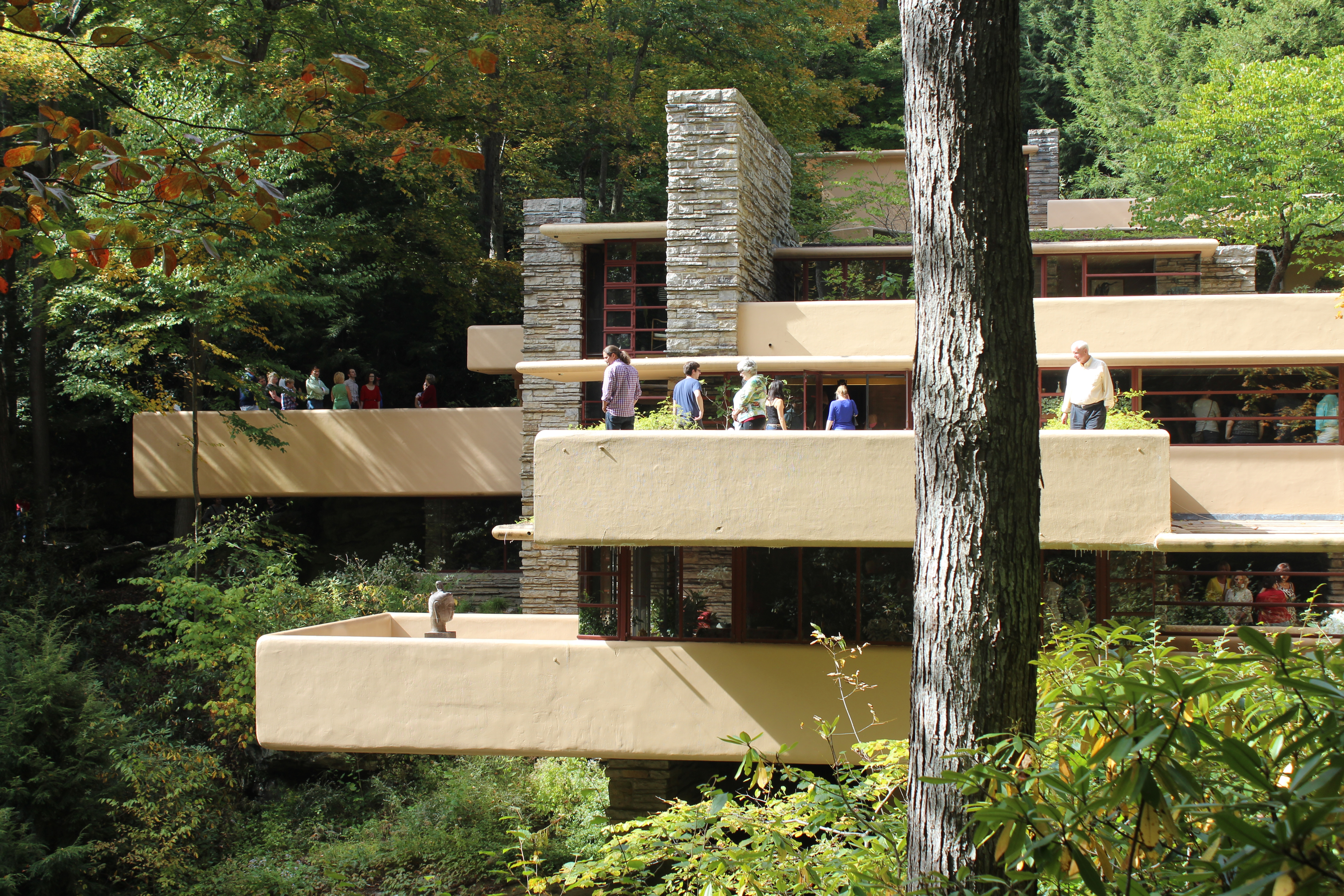
View of Fallingwater from across Bear Run

By January 1936, Wright's team had completed detailed drawings, which were largely unchanged from the initial sketches. The next month, Wright's team sent the plans to Edgar Sr. for review, and workers began building a sample wall. Edgar Sr. asked engineers in Pittsburgh to review the blueprints for the highly experimental design. The engineers recommended against constructing a building on the site, citing at least eight structural issues. Either Wright or Edgar Sr. reportedly ordered the report to be sealed inside the building, though Edgar Sr. is known to have kept a copy of the report. By early 1937, Wright's team was on its eighth set of drawings. In the final plans, Wright added a third floor and rearranged some rooms.

=== Construction ===
Edgar Sr. wrote that he constantly thought about the house, "which has become part of me and a part of my life". Wright visited every four to six weeks, appointing Mosher as his on-site representative. Wright hired Walter J. Hall, a contractor from northern Pennsylvania. Hall's former employee Earl Friar was hired as a reinforced-concrete consultant. Edgar Jr. was heavily involved with the project and acted as an intermediary between his father and Wright, and several Kaufmann's employees and extended family members also worked on site. Work was carried out by local laborers, many of whom were inexperienced; they were paid between 35 and 85 cents an hour depending on their skill level. (Note: Toker 2003, p. 204, gives a different figure of between 35 and 75 cents.) The project was characterized by conflicts between Wright, Kaufmann, and the contractors, as Wright prioritized the house's esthetics over any structural concerns. Due to Hall's careless attitude and clumsiness, Mosher ended up supervising most of the work.

==== Concrete and masonry work ====
A disused rock quarry nearby was reopened in late 1935 to provide stone for the house, although actual work on the foundation did not begin until April 1936. By then, construction was behind schedule. The masonry contractor, Norbert James Zeller, began building the house's access bridge shortly thereafter; he was later fired following disputes with Wright and Kaufmann. During a visit to the site shortly afterward, Mosher inquired where the main level of the house would be located, and Wright directed Mosher to use one of the boulders on site as a datum reference. By June 1936, workers had completed the access bridge and the footers for three of the house's "bolsters", or piers. However, Mosher ordered that the bolsters be rebuilt after receiving revised plans from Taliesin. Despite delays in delivering wood from Algoma, Wisconsin, workers had excavated the basement by that July.

Workers began pouring concrete formwork for the first-floor terrace in August 1936, and masonry work reached the second story that month. As the first-floor terrace was being poured, Kaufmann asked the engineering firm Metzger-Richardson to draw up plans for extra rebar to the concrete. Wright rejected these plans because he believed the extra steel would overload the terraces, and he also dismissed the idea of constructing additional supports in Bear Run's streambed. Contractors secretly added the rebar anyway, and when Wright heard about the increased rebar, he told Mosher to return to Taliesin. Wright wrote angrily to Kaufmann: "I have put so much more into this house than you or any other client has a right to expect, that if I don't have your confidence—to hell with the whole thing". Despite Kaufmann's expressions of confidence in Wright's work, the extra steel remained in place. The second-floor terrace was poured in October 1936, and Tafel replaced Mosher as the construction supervisor afterward.

The contractors neglected to incline the formwork slightly to account for settling and deflection. Soon after the concrete was poured, the parapet cracked at two locations. Wright attempted to reassure Edgar Sr. by saying that cracked concrete was normal and safe, but Edgar Sr. remained skeptical. Once the formwork was removed, the first-floor terrace sank about 1.75 inches (4.4 cm). Glickman, contacted by Mosher, reportedly confessed that he had forgotten to account for the compressive forces of the concrete beams, though the historian Franklin Toker disputes that this happened. Wright attributed the sagging to the parapets' weight, and he drew up plans to reinforce the western second-floor terrace and the roof above the eastern second-floor bedroom. Meanwhile, structural issues continued to arise: By December 1936, five major cracks had been detected. Mosher was reinstated as the project's supervisor, and Kaufmann's engineer installed a stone wall under the western second-floor terrace in January 1937. When Wright discovered the wall, he had Mosher remove the top course of stones; the wall was later disassembled entirely.

==== Completion ====
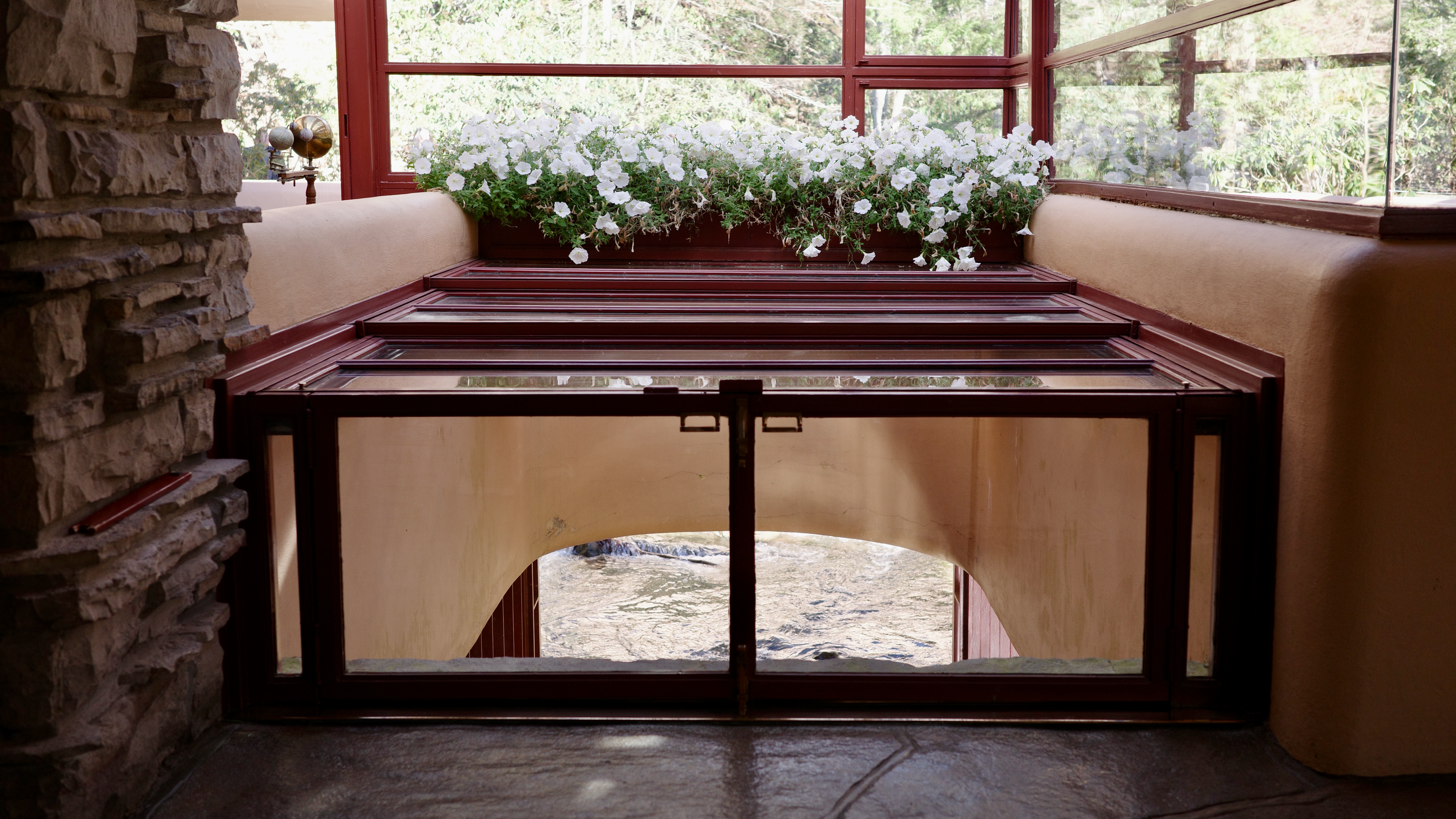
The hatch for the living-room stairs (pictured) was manufactured by Hope's Windows Inc.

By early 1937, the installation of interior finishes had begun. Hope's Windows Inc. of Jamestown, New York, manufactured the window sashes and the hatch for the living-room stairs, while Pittsburgh Plate Glass made the windows themselves. Wright also suggested covering the exteriors with gold leaf; it is unclear whether Wright had made his suggestion jokingly or seriously. In either case, Edgar Sr. hired a gold-leaf contractor, who rejected the idea, and Wright subsequently suggested finishing the facade in white mica. Wright reportedly decided on the final color, a shade of ocher, after picking up a dried rhododendron leaf; he ordered waterproof paint from DuPont. At Kaufmann's request, Wright added a plunge pool at the bottom of the living-room stairs, and he retained the large boulder on the living room's floor.

Through mid-1937, workers continued to lay floor tiles, and they conducted tests on the terraces. In addition, the contractors refined plans for details such as the paint colors and metalwork. The cork tiles in the bathrooms were particularly problematic, since they had to be installed on curved surfaces. Wright hired the Wisconsin–based Gillen Woodworking Corporation to produce furniture for the house. The Kaufmanns moved into the house in November 1937, but the main house's furnishings were not completed until 1938. Wright came up with the Fallingwater name around the same time; previously, the house had been known as the E. J. Kaufmann Residence or E. J. Kaufmann House. Even though some other American country estates (such as Biltmore, Monticello, or Mount Vernon) also used nicknames, the Kaufmanns did not use the Fallingwater name.

Wright began drawing out plans for a guest wing, replacing an existing cottage on a hill behind the main house. Wright had completed blueprints for the guest wing by May 1938, but the Kaufmanns initially objected to the interior layout and the bridge between the main and guest wings. After Wright presented final plans for the guest wing in April 1939, Edgar Jr. modified the main house's decorations and furnishings. By that September, the guest wing was being finished. Fallingwater exceeded its budget significantly. The final cost for the home and guest house was $155,000 (equivalent to about $2.8 million in 2025). (Note: Another source gives a cost of $159,300 (equivalent to about $2.9 million in 2025). This is broken down into $148,000 for the house and $11,300 for Wright's fee.) The total cost was nearly four times Kaufmann's original budget, which in turn was ten times the average cost of a four-bedroom house in Pennsylvania at the time. From 1938 through 1941, more than $22,000 was spent on additional details and modifications.

== Use as house ==
=== Early years ===
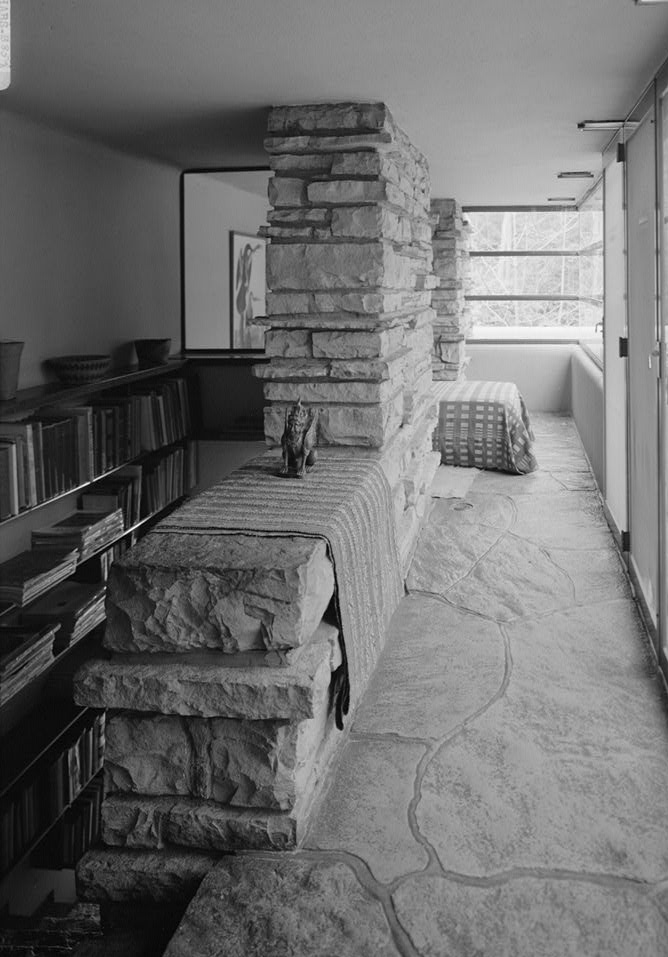
Edgar Jr.'s bedroom in the third-story gallery

The Kaufmann family used Fallingwater as a weekend home for 26 years. The family took the train to the Bear Run station, where a chauffeur drove them to the house. Herbert Ohler was the property's caretaker until 1939, when he was replaced by Jesse Hall. Relatively few changes occurred after the guest wing was completed. The Kaufmanns sometimes invited small numbers of people to Fallingwater. It hosted guests such as the artists Peter Blume, Pablo Picasso, and Diego Rivera, as well as the scientist Albert Einstein. Over the years, the family also added artwork. Part of the Kaufmanns' Bear Run estate caught fire in 1941, although the house itself was undamaged. The estate's dairy barn burned down in 1945, but the main house again avoided damage.

Fallingwater showed signs of deterioration after its completion. The house originally leaked in 50 places, though later investigations found that the leaks had arisen from errors made by the builders. (Note: According to Hoffmann 1977, p. 48, these issues included moist waterproofing, which caused the subflooring to rot, and improperly poured concrete, which contained loose pockets of sand.) The worsening condition of Fallingwater's terraces prompted Edgar Sr. to hire a surveyor in 1941. Contravening his own surveyor's advice, Edgar Sr. did not expand the wall under the western terrace. The terraces were surveyed 16 more times between 1945 and 1955. Despite subsequent repairs to the parapet, the cracks there periodically reappeared. Fallingwater's problems were so numerous that Edgar Sr. referred to it as "Rising Mildew".

=== After World War II ===
After World War II, the family spent winters at the Kaufmann Desert House in Palm Springs, California. Wright expanded the kitchen in 1946, and he drew up plans for never-built expansions of the dining area and foyer. Elsie Henderson was hired as the house's chef in 1947, working there for the next sixteen years. In 1950, and again in 1953, workers installed posts under the second floor to prevent it from sagging. Edgar Sr. observed that some windows had begun to crack and that some of the doors no longer opened easily. Furthermore, Edgar Sr. and Liliane's marriage had become strained, and Liliane wanted to build a house nearby in Ohiopyle. In the long run, the family wanted to donate Fallingwater.

Liliane died in 1952, and her husband died three years later. Edgar Jr. continued to use the house after his parents died. He discontinued Fallingwater's annual structural surveys and instead had his chief of maintenance monitor the terraces. Edgar Jr. abandoned the estate's farm and mill, planting 100,000 pine trees there, and he strengthened the living-room hatch. The eastern section of the house's roof was rebuilt in 1954. The living room was flooded during a storm two years later; while the furniture was severely damaged, the house experienced no structural damage. By then, the sagging terraces had caused the window frames to warp, and workers had to add supports to the terraces, repair the roof, and rebuild the staircase between the living room and Bear Run. Jesse Hall retired as Fallingwater's superintendent in 1959.

== Use as museum ==
=== 1960s and 1970s ===
Edgar Kaufmann Jr. announced in September 1963 that he would donate the house and about 1,500 acres (610 ha) to the Western Pennsylvania Conservancy (WPC). In exchange, the WPC agreed to open the house to the public as a house museum. At the time, many of Wright's houses were being demolished or altered significantly. The conservancy took over the house on October 29, 1963, with a speech by Pennsylvania governor William Scranton. Edgar Jr. gave the WPC $500,000 for the house's maintenance, as well as five annual payments of $30,000 for educational programs. One local newspaper wrote: "We are indeed fortunate, here in Fayette County, to have such beauty." The museum was dedicated in memory of Edgar and Liliane Kaufmann. In subsequent years, the WPC's holdings were expanded to 5,000 acres (2,000 ha), becoming the Bear Run Natural Area.

In accordance with Edgar Jr.'s request, the WPC attempted to recreate the house's original appearance, furnishing the rooms with the family's possessions. Edgar Jr. moved some of the house's artwork to his homes in New York, acquiring other work for the museum. Guided tours began in July 1964, running from April to November of each year. Visitors were allowed to enter most of the rooms but had to reserve tickets in advance. Edgar Jr. remained involved with the WPC and Fallingwater for the rest of his life, visiting the house twice annually until his death in 1989. The house began hosting scholars-in-residence during 1967, and Edward A. Robinson was appointed as the museum's supervisor in 1970. WPC members received free admission twice annually starting in 1973.

The facade was repainted in mid-1972, and the WPC added a gift shop to the museum next year. The WPC began planning a visitor center in the early 1970s, and it hired the landscape architect William G. Swain to design renovations to the property. The conservancy constructed new paths, repaved the existing trails with dark gravel, and added a small crafts store. Fallingwater was repainted repeatedly over the years, and the WPC undertook a major exterior renovation in 1976. Mildew and repeated freeze-and-thaw cycles had caused damage over time. Afterward, the WPC began repairing the facade every three to four years. The visitor pavilion was still being developed by 1977; the new structure was to contain a shop, reception center, and child-care center. The original pavilion, designed by Grant Curry Jr., opened in April 1979 and burned down two days later.

=== 1980s and early 1990s ===
The WPC rebuilt the visitor pavilion, obtaining an $800,000 grant from the Edgar J. Kaufmann Foundation. The conservancy hired the architect Paul Mayén, along with Curry, Martin & Highberger to redesign the pavilion. The pavilion partially reopened in July 1980 and was rededicated in June 1981. In addition, the trellises at the front entrance were replaced in 1982 following a storm. The WPC began hosting limited wintertime tours in January 1984. By then, the museum's annual expenses amounted to $400,000; despite high visitation, the WPC was just breaking even financially. Lynda Waggoner was appointed as the house's curator the next year, later being promoted to director. A restaurant also opened at the visitor center in 1985. During the late 1980s, the WPC spent at least $500,000 on repairs. The organization restored 182 pieces of furniture for the house's 50th anniversary, and it hired a contractor from Wilkinsburg, Pennsylvania, to add waterproofing. The woodwork and terraces were also repaired, and the windows were replaced.

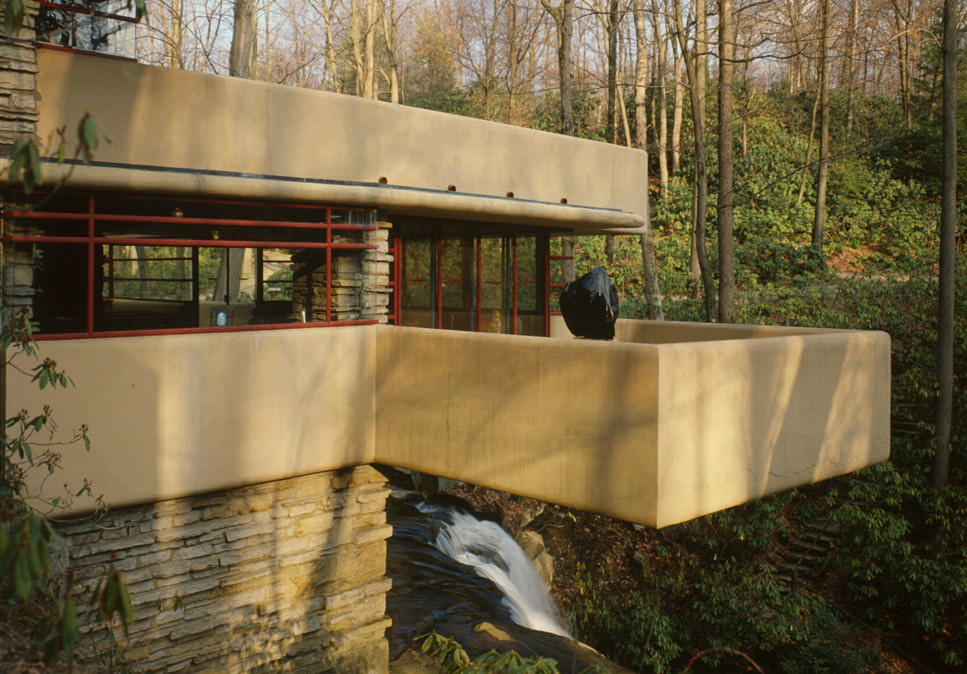
The cantilevered terraces at Fallingwater were sagging significantly by the late 1980s.

By the late 1980s, acid rain and freeze-and-thaw cycles had caused deterioration. The house was vulnerable to water damage because the site was always humid. Even though most of the leaks had been repaired, rain and snow still pooled on the terraces and roof, and water came in through the walls. In addition, the ends of the terraces had sagged by 7 inches (180 mm), tilting almost two degrees. In 1992, the WPC hired John Seekircher to fix the living room's glass hatch, which had not been opened in two decades. Waggoner also planned to repaint the house, which was complicated by strict environmental regulations regarding Bear Run.

=== 1990s and 2000s renovations ===
An engineering student, John Paul Huguley, first identified issues with the terraces in the mid-1990s. The WPC hired the engineer Robert Silman to assess the terraces and design a permanent fix. Silman's company confirmed that the terraces' cracks were growing. Though Silman's computer models also indicated that the terraces were at risk of collapsing, the WPC's chief executive, Larry Schweiger, said the terraces were not in danger of collapse. Waggoner recalled that the terraces were so brittle that visitors could actually feel them bounce. Workers installed temporary girders in 1997 at a cost of $140,000. The girders were intended to help relieve stresses on the cantilevers. The WPC cut out a section of the floor, adding a glass opening; the living room's sofa was removed as well. Temporary footings were installed in the streambed, and the stream was diverted to allow crews to access the terraces, In addition, two terraces were closed temporarily.

The engineering firm Wank Adams Slavin Associates was hired to design a large-scale restoration. Silman devised plans to post-tension the slabs by pulling high-strength steel cables through the beams. The idea of jacking up the house was deemed infeasible because it would have exacerbated the cracks. A panel of engineers and architects endorsed Silman's proposal in early 1999, and the WPC began raising $6 million for structural repairs that year. The WPC also discussed the structural issues with engineers, historians, and architects from around the world, including Wright's grandson Eric. The work was postponed by two years while the WPC raised money. The Getty Foundation provided the WPC with a $70,000 grant to investigate the structural issues, and Fallingwater received approximately $900,000 through the federal Save America's Treasures program. Additionally, Pennsylvania governor Tom Ridge provided $3.5 million, and private donors provided another $7.2 million.

Work began in late 2001, at which point the restoration was estimated to cost $11.5 million. The outer end of the first-floor terrace was raised by approximately 0.5 inches (13 mm). The post-tensioning phase cost about $4 million and was completed in six months. Though the terraces still had a noticeable sag, the post-tensioning prevented further damage to the terraces. The WPC also planned to strengthen one of the terraces using carbon fiber, rebuild the staircase from the living room to Bear Run, and repair water damage. Pamela Jerome of Wank Adams Slavin drew up plans to install roof membranes to improve drainage. Due to acid rain and emissions from a coal-fired power station nearby, the exterior also had to be repainted. Workers relocated some outbuildings and replaced the visitor center's sewage system. Signage, paths, and landscape features were rehabilitated as well. The house was connected to a municipal water system for the first time. Visitation increased after the renovations, which were largely completed in 2003. Fallingwater received $100,000 for landscaping in late 2003; the next year, the entrance roadways were reconfigured, and the sewage system was finished.

=== Mid-2000s to present ===
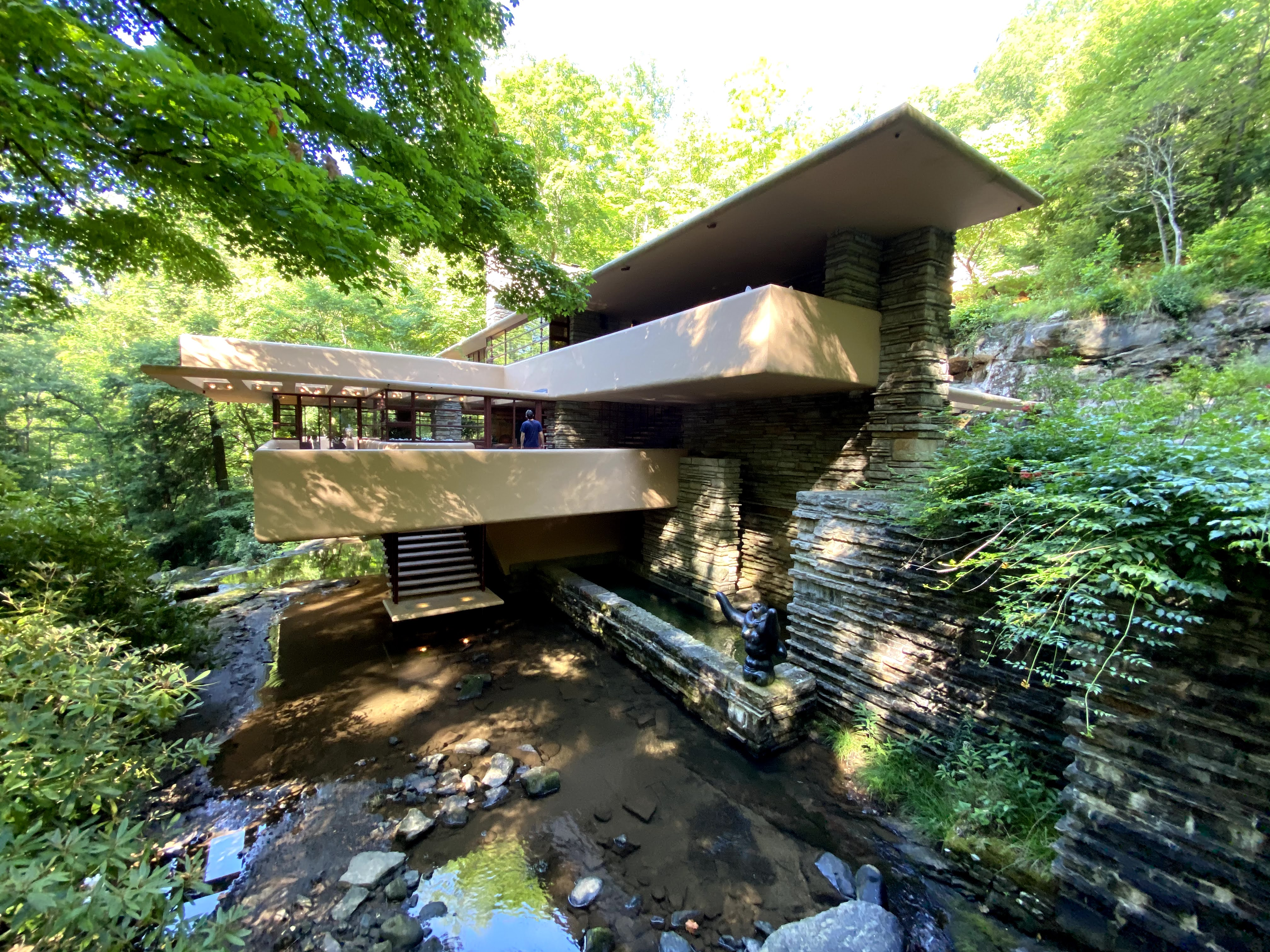
The house as seen from the access bridge

After the renovation was completed in 2005, the WPC began removing invasive species from the Fallingwater grounds that year. To prevent overcrowding, the WPC capped annual visitation at 135,000. After PPG Industries donated glass panes in 2010, the WPC replaced 319 windows at the house, hiring a firm from Peekskill, New York, to help restore the windows. In the mid-2010s, one of Fallingwater's volunteer landscapers created a pottery terrace in one of the house's planters. One of the statues on the grounds was toppled and damaged during a rainstorm in 2017, and some trees were damaged as well. Waggoner announced in 2017 that she would retire as the museum's director, and Justin W. Gunther was appointed to replace her. After becoming Fallingwater's director, Gunther devised plans for a $3 million waterproofing project, which was supposed to have begun in 2019.

The museum was temporarily closed in March 2020 due to the COVID-19 pandemic in Pennsylvania; the outdoor spaces reopened for self-guided tours that June. The same September, the Pennsylvania government gave Fallingwater nearly $240,000 to offset financial losses from the pandemic. In addition, a photovoltaic power array was installed at Fallingwater in 2022 to help power the main house and guest wing. Meanwhile, the cost of the waterproofing project doubled due to the pandemic. Much of the waterproofing installed in the 1990s had been washed away, and water entered the house through small cracks in the walls, door frames, and window frames. The WPC started patching the leaks in 2025, and scaffolding was placed around the house, which remained open for tours during the repairs. The project was complete by March 2026, when the scaffolding was removed.

== Architecture ==
Fallingwater has been described as an example of Wright's organic architecture. Though the house is also sometimes described as a Modern-styled building, The Wall Street Journal wrote that the design was "a kind of streamlined, handmade, organic architecture" not emulated by other architects. The site's natural setting may have been inspired by Japanese architecture, a style Wright liked. Fallingwater's design shares elements with Wright's earlier Prairie houses (Note: McCarter specifically cites the Thomas H. Gale House in Oak Park, Illinois, as an inspiration.) and his later Usonian houses. Elements such as trellises are derived from Italian architecture, while the kitchen is inspired by New England colonial architecture. Wright's design for the facade also shares similarities with an unbuilt villa designed by Mies van der Rohe, and the cantilevers resemble those in three structures designed by Rudolph Schindler. Wright tried to preserve natural features; for example, he installed braces and trellises around existing trees.

The main house is three stories high. Wright sought to blur the distinction between the exterior and interior, using the same materials indoors and outdoors. He also wanted breezes to be felt, and the waterfalls to be heard, throughout the house. Wright built Fallingwater out of Pottsville sandstone, in addition to reinforced concrete, steel, and plate glass. The concrete is a mixture of sand, cement, and gravel from the streambed. All the woodwork in the house is made of black walnut from North Carolina, which was selected because it did not warp as other types of wood did. Decorative motifs, such as courses of stone and wood grains, are oriented horizontally. Several of the design features—including the corner windows, foam-rubber seats, and indirect lighting—were uncommon when Fallingwater was completed.

=== Exterior ===
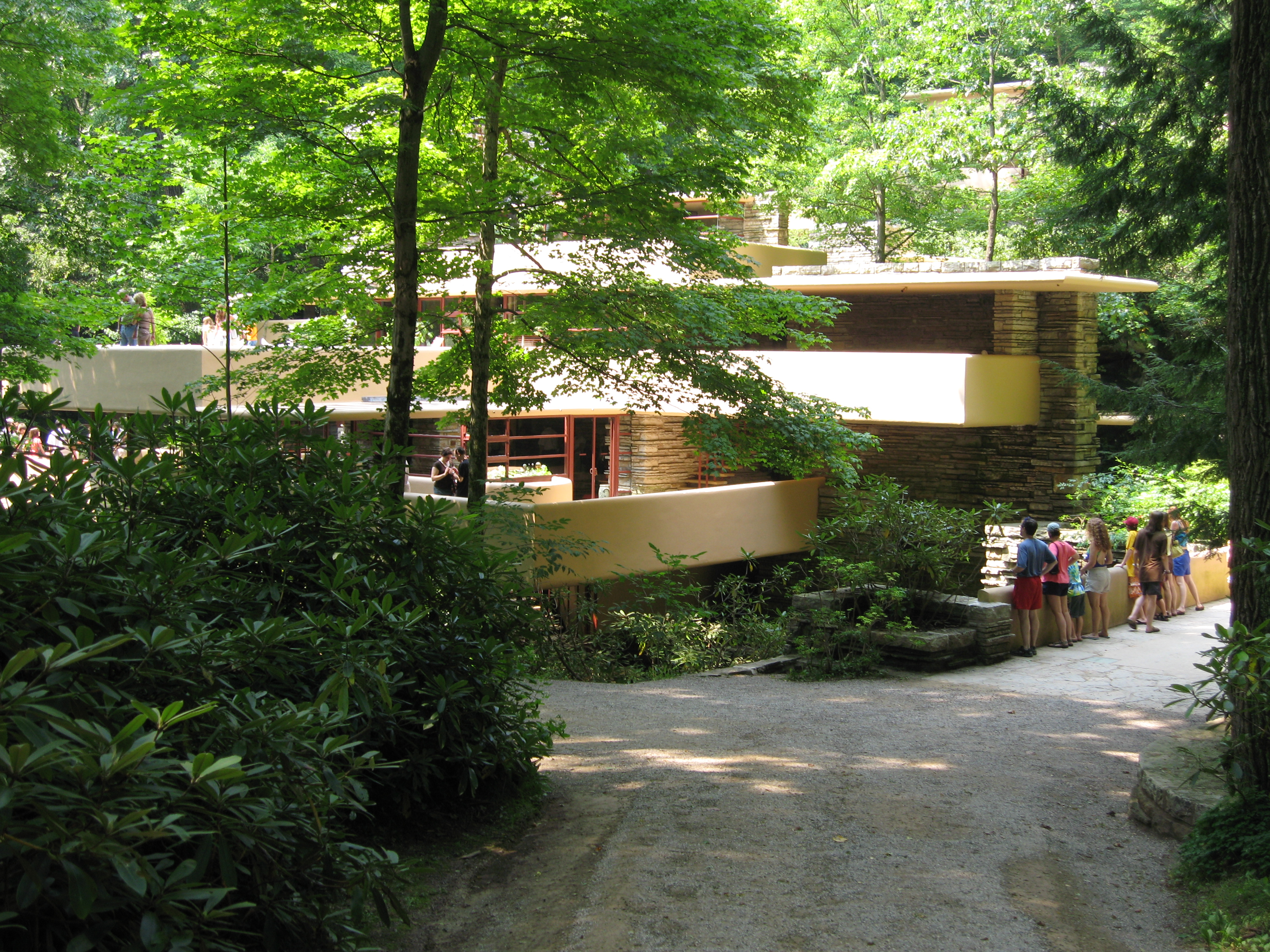
Bridge leading to the entrance of Fallingwater

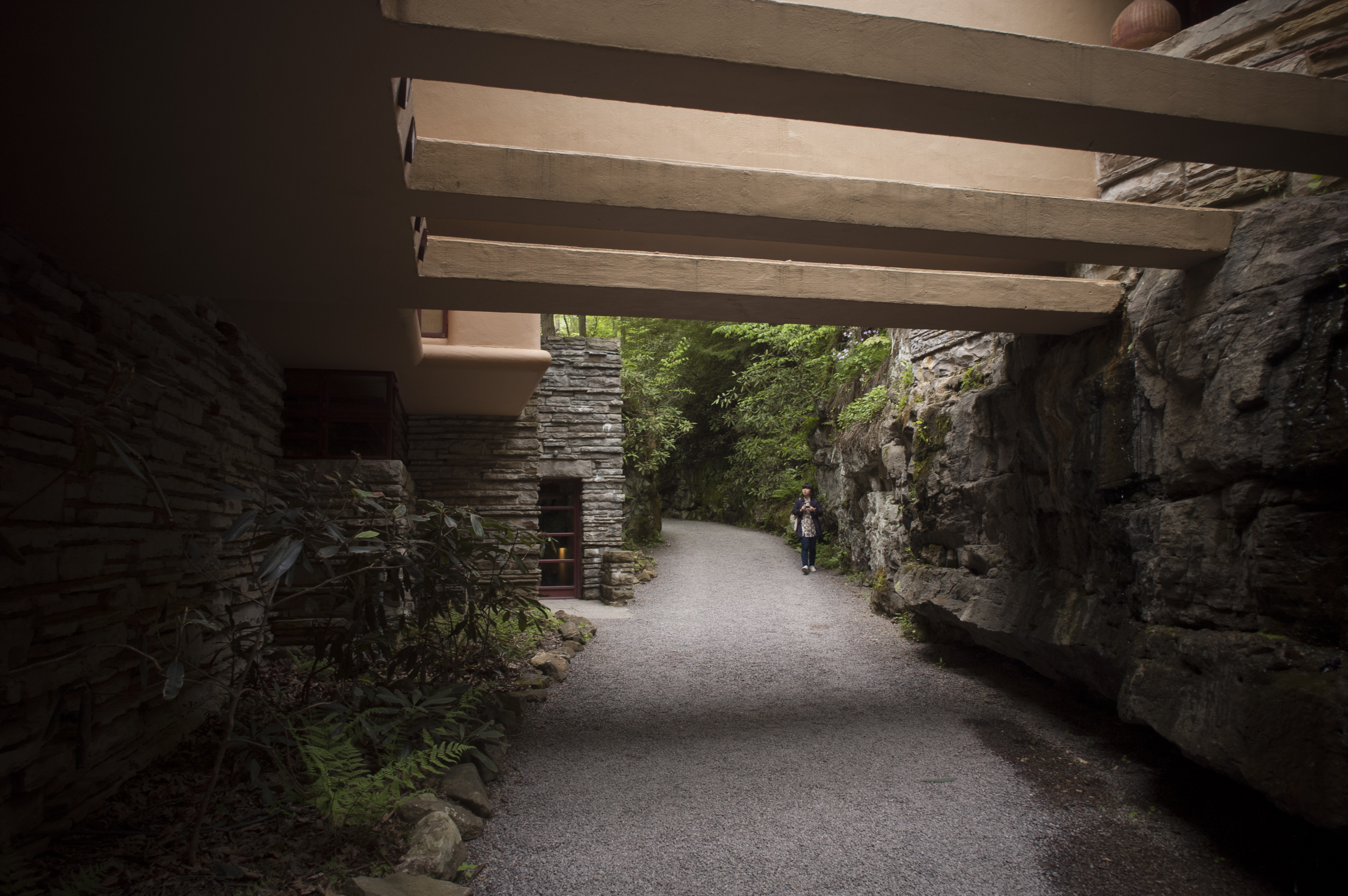
The trellises over Fallingwater's driveway; the entrance is to the left

The facade uses three colors: gray for the sandstone, a light-ocher "dead rhododendron" color for the concrete, and Cherokee red for the steel. (Note: Some sources, such as the Centre Daily Times, cite ocher and Cherokee red as the only two colors used in the house.) Red was used because Wright believed that the hue was an "invincible" color of life (Note: Milao et al. 2024, pp. 9–10, writes that, although the color was originally described as Venetian red, it was changed to Cherokee red in the 1970s. Hoffmann 1977, p. 58, cites Mosher as saying that Cherokee red had been used from the outset.) and because it was the color of burning metal. The house's windows have metal casings, which are painted Cherokee red. The windows are embedded directly into the facade, with no visible vertical mullions; they only contain horizontal transom bars. Some of the house's corners have windows that open inward.

The roof has rolled edges and is covered with beige gravel, blending in with the color of the facade. The northern elevation of the house's facade contains masonry walls with setbacks, which were intended to replicate the textures of the cliff opposite it. The house's chimney is covered in striated sandstone and rises 30 feet (9.1 m) above the first story.

The house is accessed by a 28-foot-long (8.5 m) bridge across Bear Run. At either end of the bridge are planters made of rough stone. There is a rectangular concrete panel at the middle of the bridge deck, with square, inlaid lights. Heading north from the bridge, the pathway curves to the west. The entrance is reached via a driveway with horizontal trellises overhead, which doubles as a porte-cochère. The main doorway is recessed from the facade. There is a small fountain next to the entrance, where the Kaufmanns could wash their feet after going into Bear Run.

==== Terraces ====
Fallingwater has many cantilevered terraces, which are made of concrete. The terraces are supported only at one end, extending outward from the house's chimney. All the terraces have parapets with rounded tips, which are covered with stucco and were intended to strengthen the terraces. The parapets are 26 inches (660 mm) high, much shorter than what is allowed under modern building codes. At the time of the house's construction, neither cantilevers nor reinforced concrete were commonplace. Wright likened the terraces to tree branches and, as one Associated Press writer described it, "a tray balancing on the fingers of a waiter". The terraces have also been compared to horizontal trays and to a treehouse. The horizontal axes of the terraces also contrasts with the vertical axis of the darker-gray chimney.

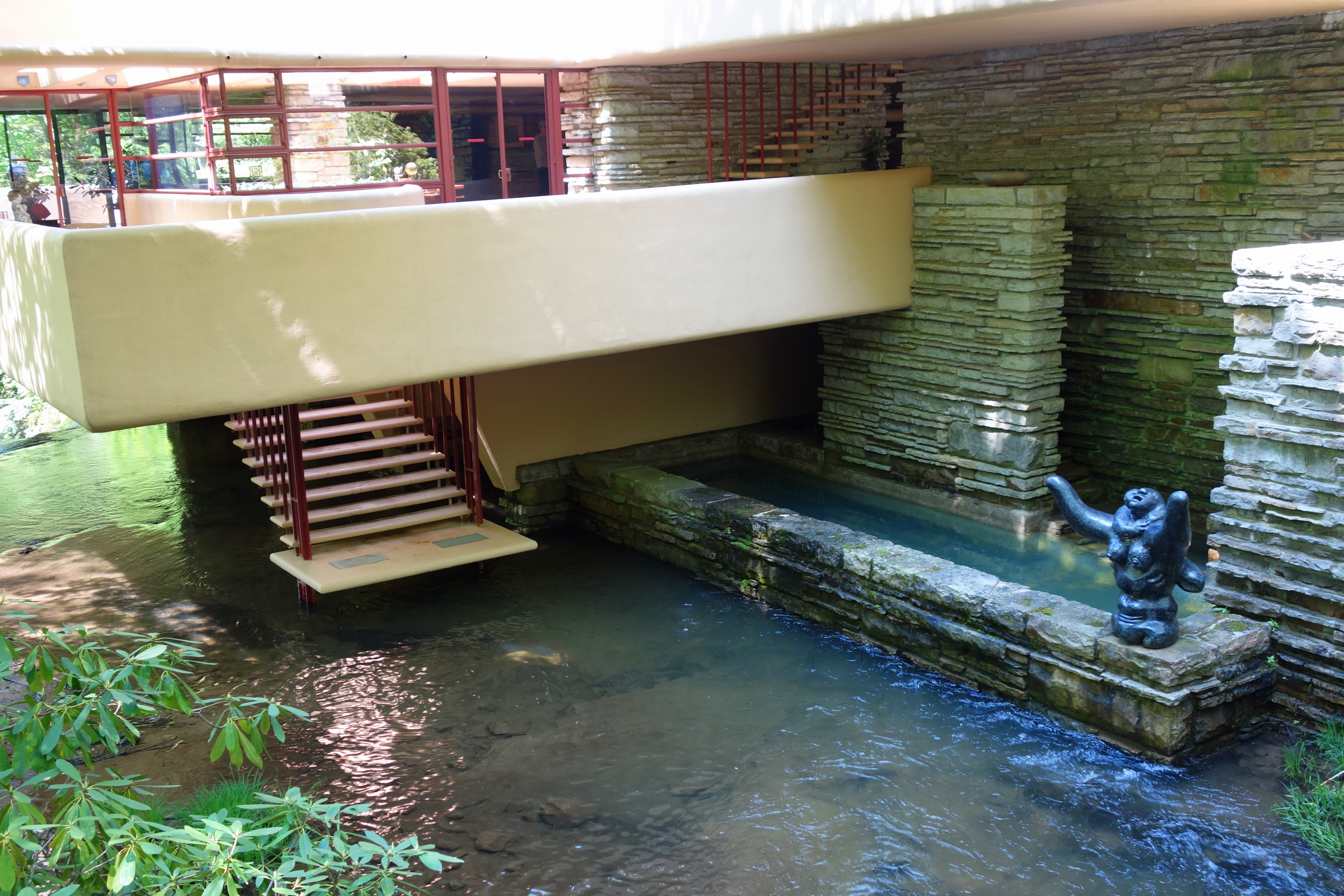
The living-room cantilever as seen from the bridge leading to the house. The staircase from the living room to Bear Run is also visible here.

The primary section of the main house, which includes the living room, runs perpendicular to the stream and is carried on an enclosed terrace. The underside of the terrace is made of a reinforced-concrete slab and is supported at one end by four "bolsters" or piers. There is a grid of cantilevered beams and joists above the slab, which is similar in shape to an inverted coffered ceiling. Above the grid are wooden planks, which are covered by the living room's stone floor tiles. Additional outdoor terraces run to the east and west of the living room; the western terrace protrudes past the kitchen's western wall.

Each of the bedrooms has its own outdoor terrace. On the second floor's southern side is another terrace, which extends further outward than the living room below it. The terrace was missing rebar at key points, so it instead rested partially on four vertical mullions along the southern wall of the living room. On the eastern end of the second floor are eight trellis beams and a glass canopy above the living room. On the western side of the house, there is another terrace above the second floor, with stairs to Edgar Sr.'s second-floor bedroom and Edgar Jr.'s third-floor study. The second floor's eastern terrace, serving the guest bedroom, is the only one in the house with a canopy.

=== Interior ===
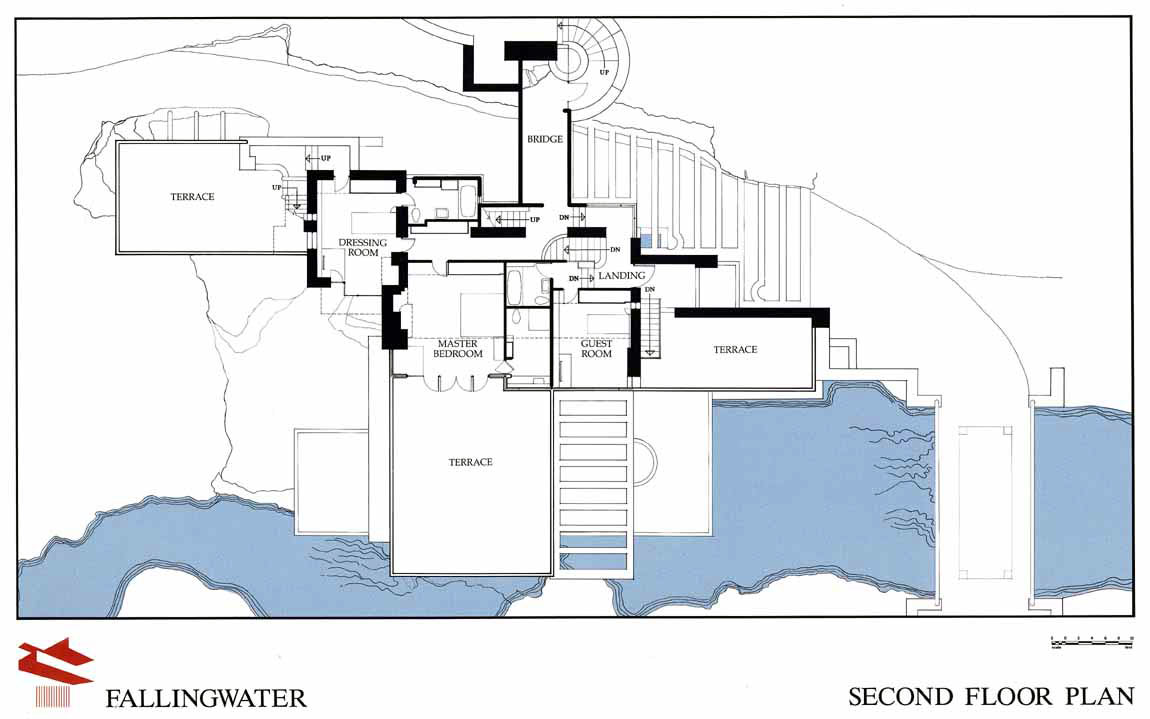
Second-floor plan

Fallingwater's asymmetrical floor plan was loosely derived from the cruciform plan of the Prairie houses. It has a floor area of 5,330 square feet (495 m^{2}), of which 2,445 square feet (227.1 m^{2}) is composed of outdoor terraces. (Note: One source gives a vastly different figure of 9,330 square feet (867 m^{2}) in total area and 4,400 square feet (410 m^{2}) in terrace area.) The remaining 2,885 square feet (268.0 m^{2}) is indoors. Including the guest wing and terraces, there is about 8,000 square feet (740 m^{2}) of space. The walls, chimney, and piers are made of sandstone from the surrounding area. The house's superstructure does not use any steel I-beams, but it does use folded slabs of reinforced concrete for structural support. Steel was used for the windows and doors. The floors have black-walnut millwork as well as sandstone finishes. The terraces' subfloors are made of redwood timbers.

The house has four bedrooms. (Note: Some sources give a conflicting figure of three bedrooms. Edgar Jr.'s study occupies what was supposed to be the fourth bedroom.) Fallingwater has smaller spaces leading to larger rooms, an example of Wright's compression-and-release principle; one source described the interiors as "spaces of varying sizes and shapes that seem to flow from one to the other". The hallways have low ceilings to prevent loitering and to create a cave-like atmosphere. There are windows at the ends of the hallways. Wright also shrank the bedrooms to encourage occupants to use the terrace. Wright, who was 5 ft 8 in (1.73 m) tall, designed the house based on the assumption that the average person was his height, so some ceilings are as low as 6 feet 4 inches (1.93 m). The highest ceilings are 9 feet (2.7 m). The three rooms in the chimney—the first-floor kitchen and two bedrooms above—are the only rooms in the house with identical dimensions. Although the first story is wheelchair-accessible, the other stories are not, and there is no space for an elevator in the house.

Interior decorations, including lights with dentils and shields, were intended to contrast with the exterior design. Some interior design elements (such as furniture, shelves, and the beam on which the kitchen kettle is hung) are cantilevered, while others (including niches and stairs) incorporate circular arcs. The spaces are illuminated by indirect lighting, a novelty for residential buildings at the time of Fallingwater's completion. The illumination is primarily composed of fluorescent lights covered by shields, though there are also desktop and tabletop lamps, which are made of bronze with wooden shields. Wright placed the house's toilets about 10.5 inches (270 mm) above the floor, as he believed that a squatting position was healthier than sitting atop a standard American toilet. In addition, he clad the bathrooms with cork tiles, and he ordered industrial-sized shower heads to make visitors feel like they were under a waterfall.

==== First story ====
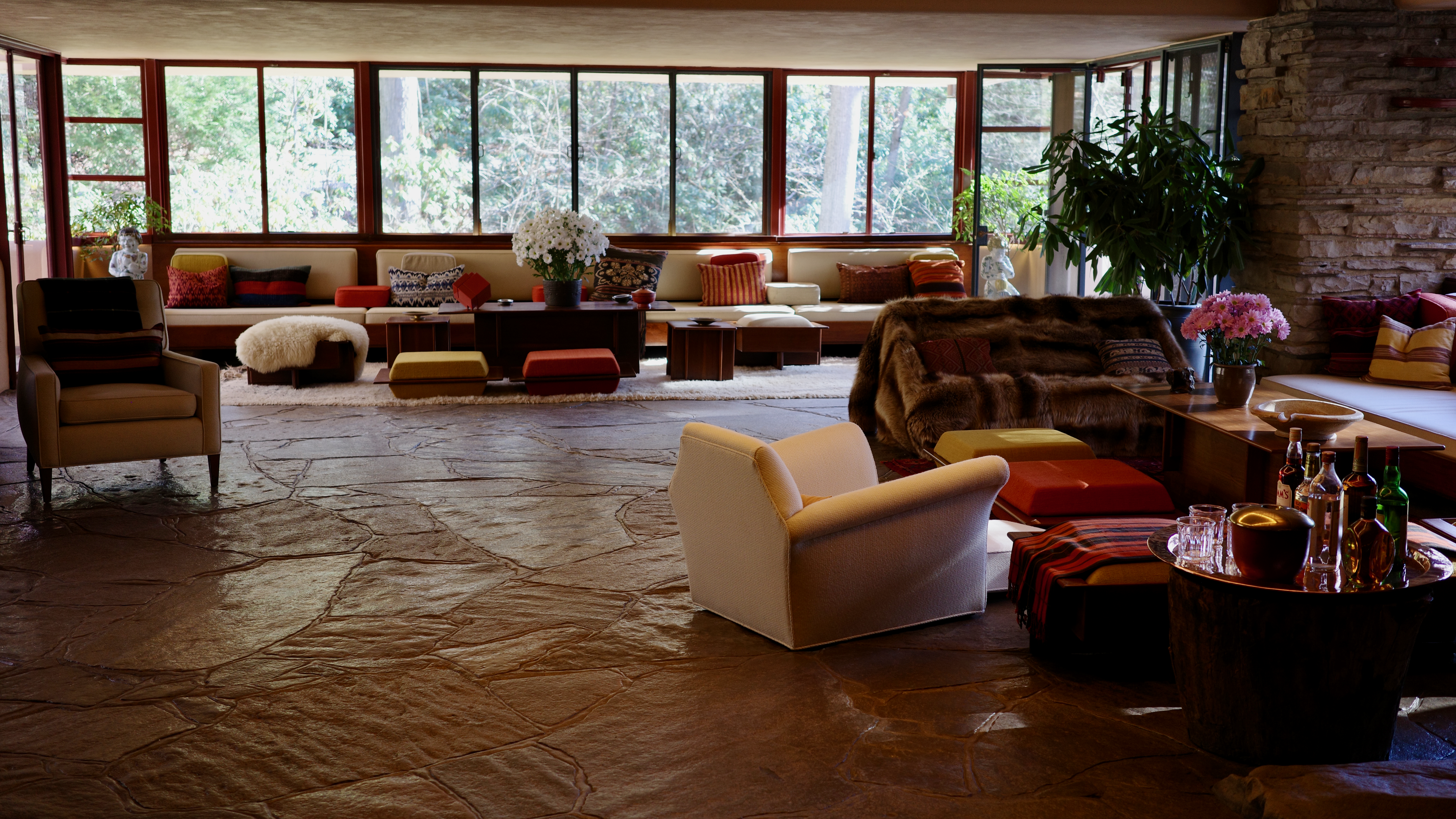
Furniture in the living area

The ground or first story contains the main entrance, the living area (which is cantilevered above the waterfall), and the kitchen. The first story has a waxed stone floor, an allusion to the stream flowing below it. The bolsters divide the house into four bays from west to east, each of which measures 12 feet (3.7 m) wide. The main entrance, within the easternmost bay, leads to a small foyer with stone walls. There is a niche for storing coats and scarves. Three steps ascend from the foyer to the living room.

The living area occupies the center two bays. (Note: Sources variously cite the living area as measuring 45 by 35 feet (14 by 11 m), 48 by 38.5 feet (14.6 by 11.7 m), or 50 by 40 feet (15 by 12 m) across.) The room also functions as a study and dining area and, as such, has been described as a great room. A niche on one wall was intended as a music area. On the western wall, another 6-foot-tall (1.8 m) niche includes a fireplace, whose hearth is made of boulders from the site. In the niche is a cast iron kettle suspended from a swinging arm. In front of the fireplace, a 7-foot-long (2.1 m) boulder protrudes from the floor. Wright had wanted to shave the top of the boulder, but Edgar Sr. insisted that it be kept. A dining area, on the living room's northern wall, adjoins a stone staircase to the upper stories. The eastern wall has a small library. Two stone piers, in the middle of the room, support a coved ceiling.

There are windows on three sides of the living room, as well as doors to the western and eastern terraces. From the eastern terrace, a stairway ascends to the second floor. The living area also has a glass-enclosed hatch, which covers a concrete stairway descending into Bear Run. Despite Edgar Sr.'s doubts about the hatch, Wright and Edgar Jr. had insisted that the stair was "absolutely necessary from every standpoint". The stairs are mostly underneath a canopy, except the lowest steps, which are beneath a semicircular lightwell. The stairs end at a landing just above the stream. There is a shallow plunge pool at the bottom of the stairway, (Note: The depth of the plunge pool is variously cited as 48 inches (4 ft; 122 cm) or 53 inches (130 cm).) which is fed by a reservoir. The Kaufmanns kept the hatch open during the summer.

A doorway connects the living area with the kitchen, which occupies the house's westernmost bay. Unlike the other rooms in the house, the kitchen is a utilitarian space; one writer described it as having a cave-like atmosphere. An annex adjoins the kitchen to the west. When the Kaufmanns lived there, Liliane seldom used the kitchen.

==== Other stories ====
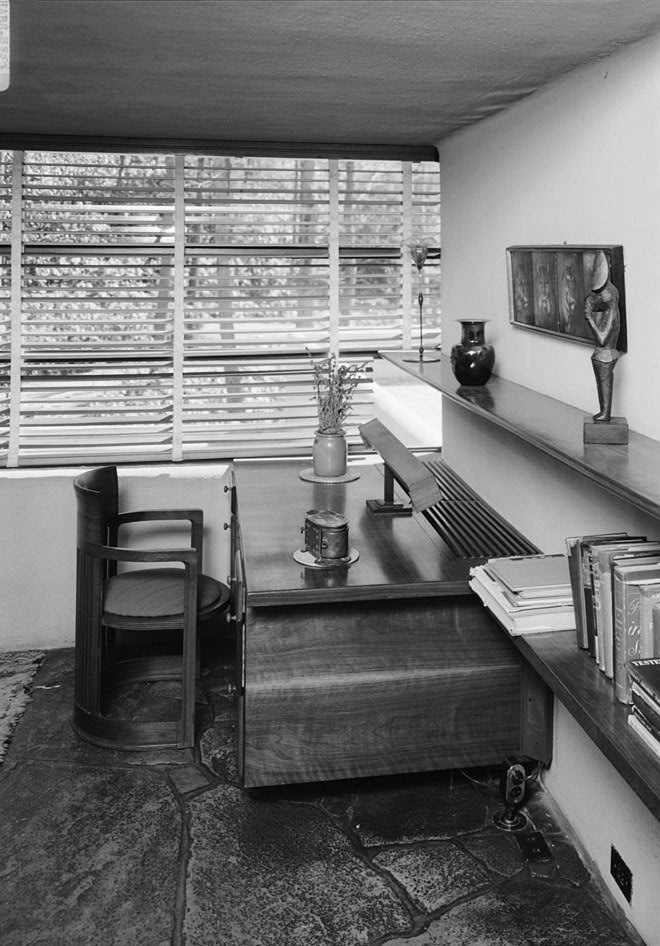
The guest bedroom

From the main staircase's second-story landing, steps lead up and down to the various rooms and terraces. The second floor contains two bedrooms. There is a master bedroom above the middle of the living room. The master bedroom has custom movable shelves and bedside lighting, glass doors to the master-bedroom terrace, and an ornate fireplace mantel with three large rocks. There is a dressing room above the kitchen, as well as a second bedroom (originally used by guests) above the eastern portion of the living room. These rooms have simpler fireplaces. The bedroom ceilings decrease in height from wall to wall. A gallery connects with a footbridge over the house's driveway, which leads to the guest wing and is covered by a terrace. There is a moss garden and part of a cliff face next to the footbridge.

The third story's concrete floor slab is folded for additional strength. There is a bedroom directly above the second-story dressing room, which Edgar Jr. used as a study. The study's fireplace mantel is made of red stone from the site. Liliane used the third-story terrace as a roof garden with herbs. On the third floor is a dead-end gallery, which was originally intended to connect with the footbridge over the driveway, but instead functioned as a bedroom for Edgar Jr. A set of stairs descends to the western second-story terrace.

The house also has a cellar with space for a partial bathroom, storage, and a boiler room, in addition to a wine cellar. There are exposed pipes and boilers in the cellar, and heat pipes are embedded in the walls.

=== Guest wing ===
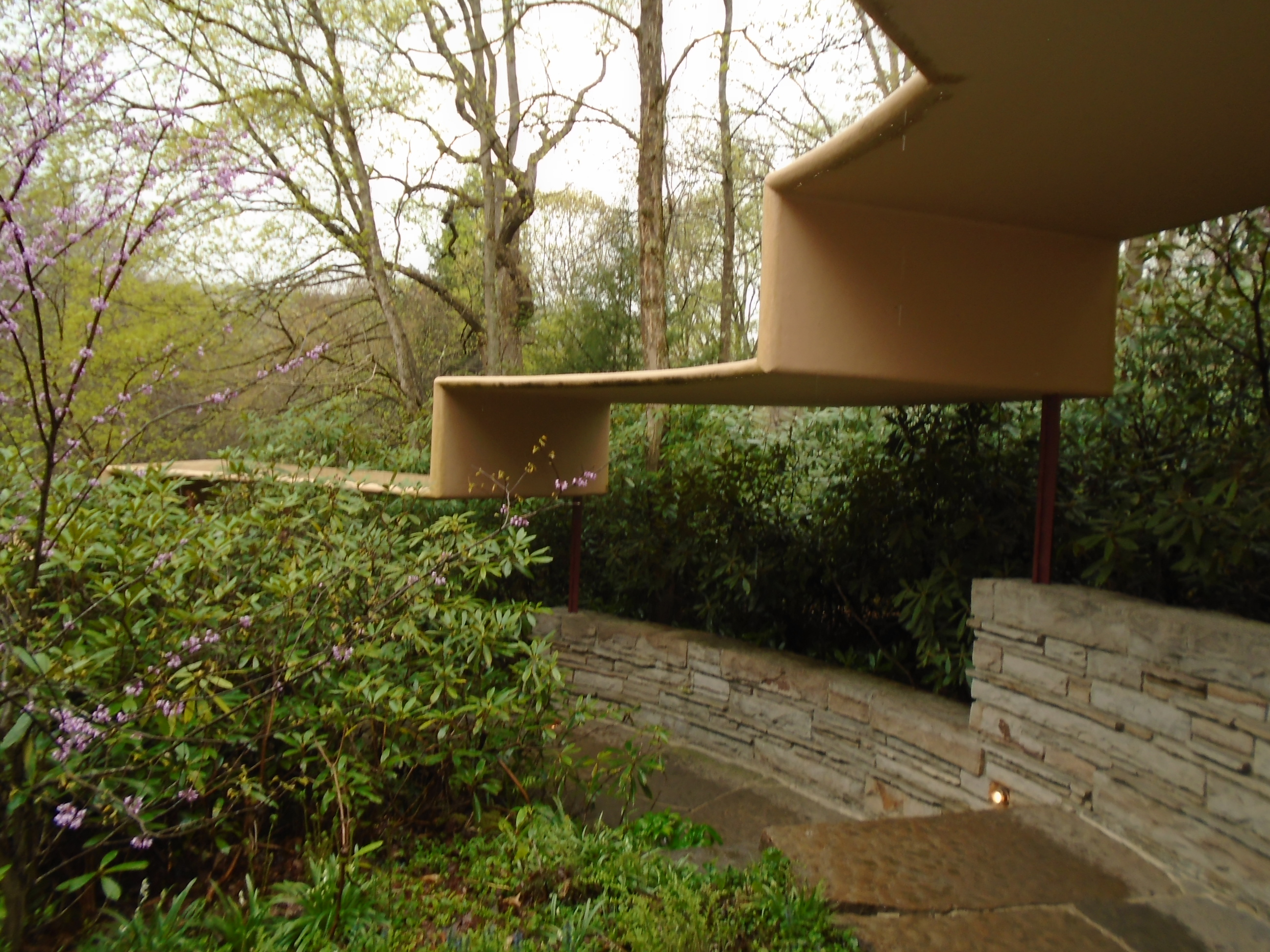
Path from main house to guest wing

The footbridge from the main house connects to a curved breezeway or open-air walkway, which in turn connects with a guest and servant wing. The walkway runs underneath a stepped concrete canopy, supported by steel posts along one side. The path curves around the site of a large oak tree that was removed in 2001. The walkway includes a small rock pool with a sculpture and a boulder that has water cascading down it. The cascade was not part of the original plans but was added after workers discovered a hidden spring near the boulder.

The guest wing's ceilings are typically 7 feet 4 inches (2.24 m) tall, and it has a lounge, bedroom, and bathroom. The lounge has a stone fireplace mantel, a hidden wardrobe, clerestory windows and shelves on one wall, and a bench that doubles as a bed. The adjoining guest room is adjacent to an outdoor swimming pool. The guest pool, measuring 31 feet (9.4 m) long and 6 feet (1.8 m) deep, is fed by water from a spring. The guest wing's bathroom has a mirror designed by Edgar Jr.

Adjacent to the guest house is a carport with four parking spots, which is accessed from the house's driveway and has a tall concrete wall. The carport and guest wing are connected by a chimney and recessed stair. There are three bedrooms and a bathroom above the carport, which are used by staff. These rooms contain the same finishes as the main house. Extending southeast of the guest wing is a terrace with a cantilevered canopy. Wright designed a garage for the upper story in 1947, which was not built.

== Collection ==
Fallingwater's collection includes over 1,000 objects. Until the 2000s renovation, the house had no air conditioning or curtains. This, along with high humidity and high levels of ultraviolet light, has made the collection particularly vulnerable to damage.

=== Furnishings and furniture ===
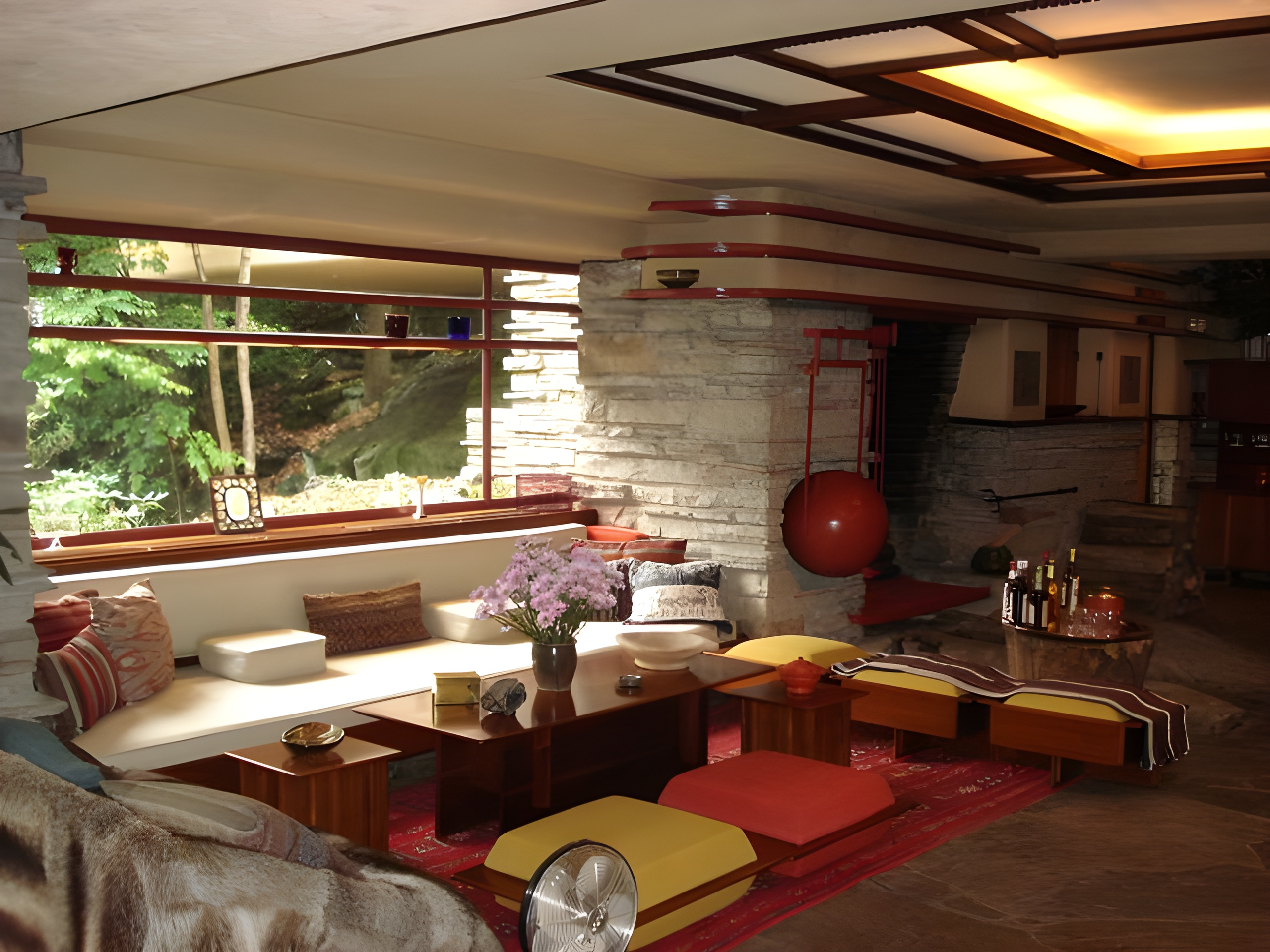
The interior of Fallingwater, showing a sitting area with furnishings designed by Wright

Half of the house's furniture is built-in, while the other half is movable. Wright, who believed that his clients should not arbitrarily swap out decoration, designed most of Fallingwater's built-in furniture. There are nearly 200 pieces of furniture, (Note: An Architectural Digest article gives a figure of nearly 170 pieces. Another source cites a figure of more than 160 pieces.) including wooden wardrobes, chairs, cabinets, tables, and backboards. Many objects have walnut finishes to prevent moisture buildups, and many of the walls have wooden shelves and trim. Among the original furnishings are sheepskin rugs, a sheepskin couch, foam-rubber seats, and cantilevered tables. Edgar Jr. helped Wright design sliding shelves for some of the cabinets. The WPC owns the trademarks to the pieces of furniture that Wright designed.

The living room's expandable dining table, which could seat about 18 people, conceals a pier underneath. Each bedroom's headboard is located on the room's eastern wall so the Kaufmanns would not wake up with sun in their eyes. Some of the furniture, including a desk in Edgar Sr.'s study, has rounded cutouts to accommodate the corner windows, which swing inward. The house also has wooden radiator cases, and the kitchen has metal cabinets and a stove. The Kaufmanns bought other objects for the house, including Tiffany lamps. The family also acquired objects through trips to Mexico and through Edgar Jr.'s connections with New York's Museum of Modern Art (MoMA). Most of the Kaufmanns' furnishings remain in place, though some objects, such as rugs and pillowcases, have been replaced over the years.

The Kaufmanns occasionally rejected some of Wright's suggested decorations and furnishings. For instance, Edgar Sr. refused Wright's designs for custom rugs, floor lamps, and chairs. The Kaufmanns, unhappy with Wright's original barrel-shaped seats, bought three-legged stools, which provided more stability on the irregular stone floors. For the most part, the windows did not have drapes or shades, since Wright wanted the windows to be unobstructed. Liliane ordered privacy blinds for the guest bedroom's windows, and shelves were installed across the living room's windows. In another case, a local newspaper described a rumor that the Kaufmans hid a set of tables whenever Wright came over, because he disliked them.

=== Art ===
When Fallingwater was finished, Wright gifted the Kaufmanns six Japanese woodblock prints by Hiroshige and Hokusai. The rest of Fallingwater's art was selected by the Kaufmanns, who liked collecting art from a variety of cultures. The multicolored artwork in the house contrasts with the ocher, gray, and red tones of the exterior. The main house contains artwork from countries such as Japan, Morocco, and Mexico, as well as religious artworks. During visits to the house, Wright sometimes recommended artwork for the Kaufmanns to acquire.

The art collection includes pieces such as Diego Rivera's El Sueño and Pablo Picasso's The Smoker and The Artist and his Model. The mural Madonna and Child, painted in the 18th century by an unknown artist, is placed at the second-floor staircase landing. Liliane's bedroom features a niche with a wooden sculpture of Madonna and Child, which was carved c. 1420, while Edgar Sr.'s room includes two busts by Richmond Barthé. Edgar Jr.'s study includes a marble sculpture by Jean Arp and an abstract landscape by Lyonel Feininger. A portrait of Edgar Sr. by Victor Hammer hangs next to the dining area. The bottom of the house's plunge pool contains Jacques Lipchitz's sculpture Mother and Child. One of the house's original artworks, The Horseman by Marino Marini, was destroyed in a 1956 flood.

The outbuildings and grounds have other pieces of art. The guesthouse includes woodblock prints and an 1877 landscape painting by José María Velasco Gómez, while the guest wing's pool has an abstract sculpture by Peter Voulkos. The grounds also contain three sculptures by Mardonio Magaña, and there are also items such as a Hindu god's head and a Buddha statue. Other artworks included a silk screen by Marcel Duchamp. After the WPC took over Fallingwater, the collection was expanded with murals and sculptures by Picasso, Lyonel Feininger, Luisa Rota, and Bryan Hunt. Edgar Jr. also donated some of his own books to the museum.

== Management ==
=== Tours and programs ===
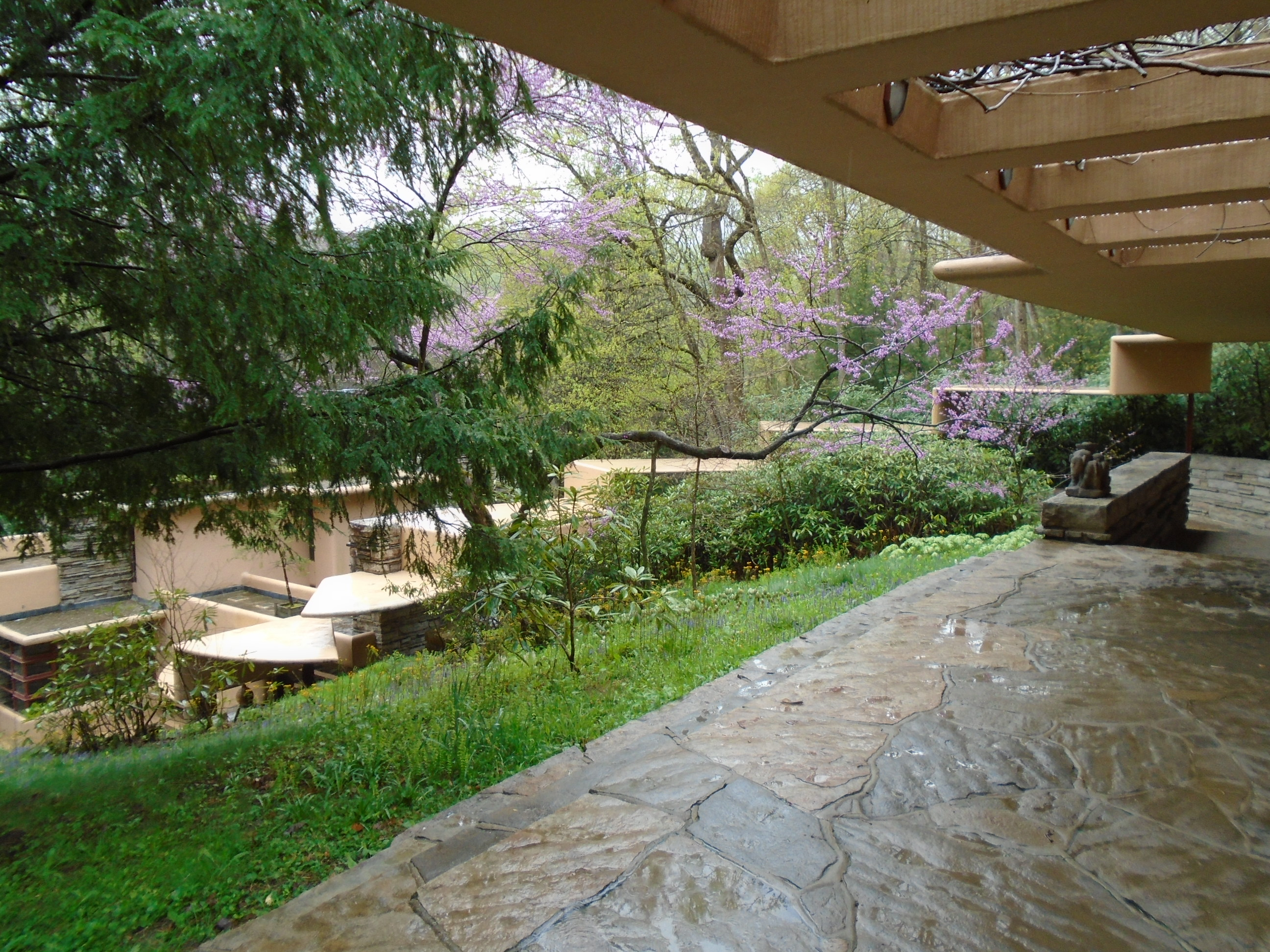
Fallingwater as seen from its guest wing

The Western Pennsylvania Conservancy maintains Fallingwater, as well as the 5,000-acre (2,000 ha) Bear Run Natural Area surrounding it. The WPC's logo for the house, as of 2026, is inspired by a typeface devised by Edgar Kaufmann Jr. The WPC hosts tours of the house, which typically run between March and November of each year. In addition, during December, there are tours on weekends and during the last week of the year.

There are several types of tours, which cover different parts of the house. Standard tours cover only part of the house and do not allow photography; extended tours, which do allow photographs, cover the entire house. There are also pre-recorded tours for non-English speakers. Prior to the COVID-19 pandemic, guided tour groups were sent through the house every six minutes, and different tour groups often ran into each other. After the pandemic, tour groups were sent every ten minutes, allowing them to see the rooms without being interrupted by another group. Every year in late August, the WPC hosts a "twilight tour" in which visitors can go on self-guided tours before attending a picnic and concert at sunset.

The conservancy operates the visitor pavilion. Young children, who cannot tour the house, stay at the visitor pavilion's child-care center. Starting in the 1990s, the WPC sold furnishings based on the designs of Fallingwater's furniture; these include chairs, coffee tables, and desks. Additionally, in the 2000s, the WPC sold jewelry with pieces of concrete that were removed from Fallingwater during its restoration. During the Christmas and holiday season, the Fallingwater Museum Store operates a temporary outpost in Downtown Pittsburgh. The WPC operates several educational programs for students and teachers as well. Starting in 2010, the WPC hosted sleepover events for adults at nearby Mill Run, which included private tours of Fallingwater.

=== Attendance ===
In its first two years as a museum, Fallingwater had 117,000 visitors from 66 countries and nearly every U.S. state. Initially, the busiest months for the house were September and October, in part because people came to see the foliage during the autumn. Many of the visitors are fans of Wright's architecture. The museum's visitors over the years have included U.S. second lady Joan Mondale, as well as the actors Anne Baxter, Brad Pitt, and Angelina Jolie.

The house accommodated 250,000 total visitors during the 1960s, and Fallingwater recorded a lifetime attendance of more than half a million by 1975, when it accommodated 62,000 visitors per year. One million people had visited the house by 1982; at the time, the house accommodated 120,000 visitors a year. One reporter estimated in 1989 that 15% of the house's visitors were from foreign countries. Fallingwater continued to record nearly 130,000 annual visitors through the 1990s, and an Associated Press article from 1999 estimated that over 2.7 million people had visited the building ever since it opened to the public. Contract magazine said in 2001 that the house saw 140,000 visitors annually, though other sources from the 2000s put the annual visitor numbers at around 120,000. By the 2010s, annual visitation had reached 160,000. A 2022 article from The Architect's Newspaper wrote that Fallingwater had seen 5 million visitors ever since its opening.

== Impact ==
Fallingwater was one of the world's most-heavily-discussed modern–style structures by the 1960s, and it has been described as the world's most famous private residence not belonging to a member of royalty. Alice T. Friedman said in 1998 that Fallingwater was one of a few 20th-century residences, along with the Farnsworth House and Villa Savoye, which consistently captivated visitors despite being widely covered in the media. Another writer for Curbed grouped Fallingwater and the Farnsworth House with Philip Johnson's Glass House and Eero Saarinen's Miller House as American modernist icons, "glorified in equal part by architecture geeks and tourists". Though it is unknown whether Wright had an active role in publicizing Fallingwater, its fame helped revitalize Wright's career. He went on to design 200 additional structures, though the Kaufmann family never rehired him.

=== Reception ===
==== Mid-20th century ====
Upon Fallingwater's completion, it received near-universal praise from American media publications as diverse as New Masses and Town & Country. A writer for The Christian Science Monitor in 1938 wrote that the use of contrasting materials, shapes, and tones "add so much enchantment to the interior", while Time called Fallingwater Wright's "most beautiful job". Town & Country likened the horizontal terraces to an airplane and described the house as "solid and sensible [...] aerated with imagination, with the spirit of the woods". Fallingwater was even praised by critics who disliked modern architecture, such as Talbot Hamlin, as well as in foreign publications. Only two architecture magazines—Charette and The Federal Architect—are known to have reviewed the house negatively upon its completion. For Fallingwater's design, Wright received a silver medal from the Pan-American Congress of Architects in 1940.

The Pittsburgh Sun-Telegraph wrote in 1941 that Fallingwater "was for several years the prime example of modernism". Olgivanna Wright regarded Fallingwater as "the most dramatic home my husband designed", saying that the house was the only Wright–designed building that many people could name. Nearly two decades after the house's completion, The Baltimore Sun described Fallingwater as "a handsome and daring house" in its own way but a "monumental profanity" with relation to the natural setting. When the house was turned over to the WPC, a writer for the Pittsburgh Press described the home as having a "deeper beauty". Newsday praised the "sheer poetry of" the house's existence, saying that the house blended with its natural surroundings, while a Baltimore Sun writer said "it could only have been built by an American, for an American". The Evening News wrote in 1974 that the house "seems like it was built yesterday".

==== Late 20th century to present ====
A Baltimore Sun writer, in 1981, praised both the house's architecture and furnishings, regarding the Kaufmanns' possessions as giving Fallingwater a homey feel. The Patriot-News said that Fallingwater retained the character of a mountain lodge, and Thomas Hine of The Philadelphia Inquirer regarded the house as being simultaneously comfortable and rustic. The New York Times described Fallingwater in 1991 as "probably the most widely acclaimed modern residence in America". A writer for The Philadelphia Inquirer observed that the house was unusually cozy for a modern–styled house and that the rooms were not "pretentious, grand or even luxurious". The Wall Street Journal's architecture critic Ada Louise Huxtable wrote that the house "surprises and inspires" and that images of the house's cantilevered terraces were iconic. In 2026, architect Brad Cloepfil wrote that it was "the most powerful yet intimate, contextual yet original piece of contemporary architecture I have ever seen".

New York Times writer Vivien Raynor and Financial Times writer Edwin Heathcote both described Fallingwater as a rejoinder to the Bauhaus movement, while a writer for the National Post characterized the house as a summary of Wright's design philosophy. Critics have also likened Fallingwater to an art piece, and the art historian Vincent Scully called it "one of the complete masterpieces of twentieth-century art".

Writers for the Indiana Gazette and The Washington Post described the house as interpreting and adapting to its surroundings and to nature. The Hartford Courant said that, despite mixed reviews of Wright's design philosophy, the house itself "feels organic and inevitable", and The Guardian said that Fallingwater combined the natural environment and modern-style architecture. Blair Kamin wrote for the Chicago Tribune that the house "appears to be in complete harmony with nature yet it also appears distinctly man-made". David Taylor of The Washington Post said the design "gives fresh meaning to the phrase 'living on the land'", while Americas magazine called the house "a universal icon of the persistent effort to achieve harmony with nature". Another writer for The Globe and Mail said that the house was "abstract, bold, intellectually rigorous, formally unnatural", counterbalancing its surroundings. Smithsonian magazine said that the house "evokes the American desire to exalt nature and dominate it, to claim modernity and reject it", while McCarter said the house "appears to us to have grown out of the ground and into the light". In 2026, another writer likened the terraces to "arms outstretched in amazement at the fall finery in the surrounding forest".

Not all commentary was positive. In 1997, The Baltimore Sun wrote that the house "reeks of the architect's arrogance, from the low ceilings (Wright himself was short) to the uneven floors" and questioned whether the house's high maintenance costs were worth it. William Thorsell wrote for The Globe and Mail that the house "turns its back to the landscape" and that the terrace parapets, the built-in furniture, and the use of rock and dark wood gave the house "a basement feeling". Thorsell felt that the house was in the wrong place because the waterfall, the site's primary attraction, could not readily be seen from the house itself. A writer for the Detroit Free Press, viewed the house largely positively but regarded the house as being impractical for families, with little closet space.

=== Media ===
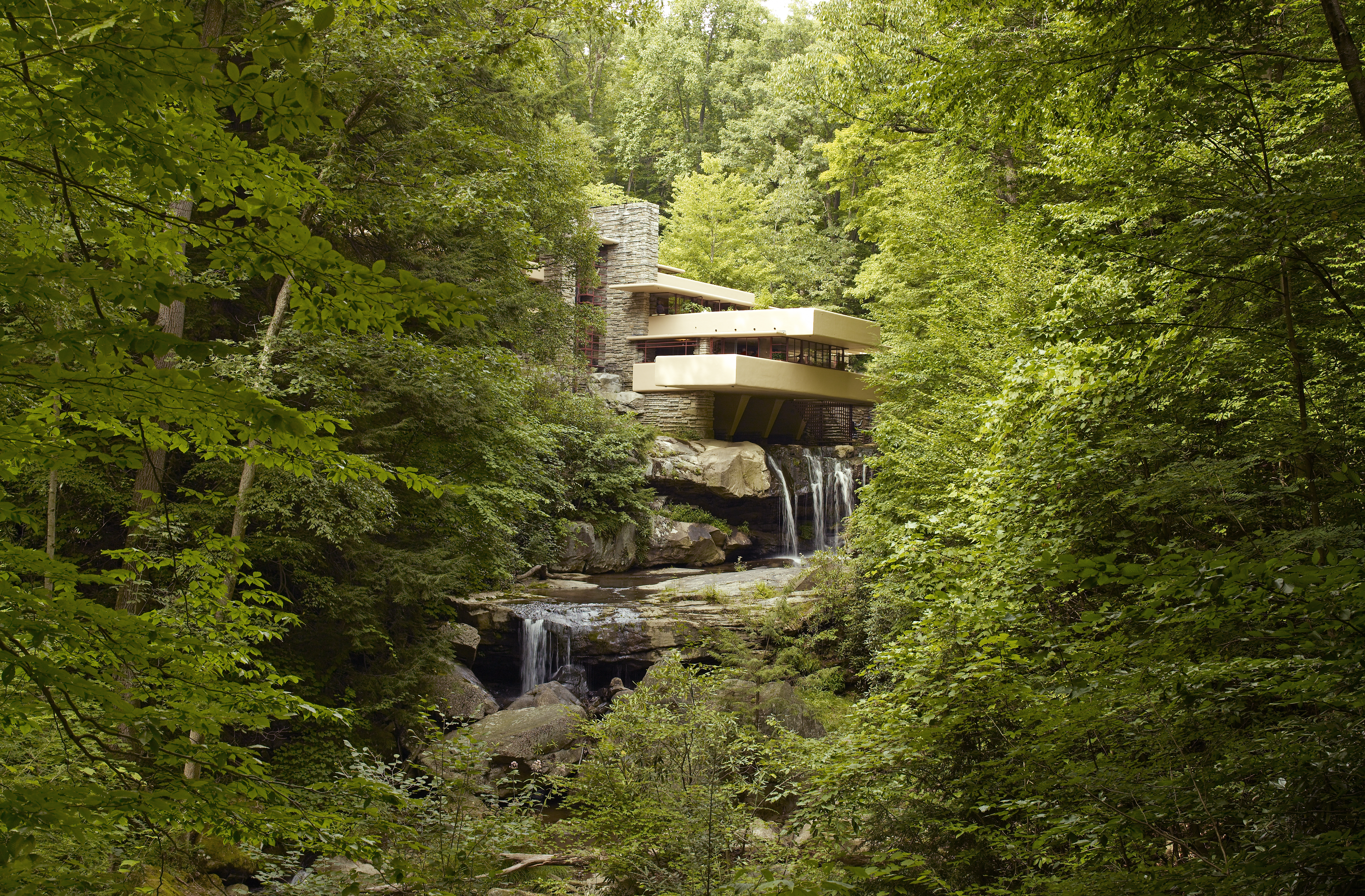
Fallingwater as seen from Bear Run farther downstream

Even before its completion, Fallingwater attracted sightseers and was the subject of news articles and photographs. The first newspaper articles to mention Fallingwater were published in Wisconsin in January 1937. The house gained more prominence in early 1938 following a MoMA exhibition and extensive media coverage, particularly in publications controlled by Henry Luce and William Randolph Hearst. The Pittsburgh Post-Gazette wrote that the house attracted notice because of its unusual site.

Over the years, there have been many books, articles, and studies on Fallingwater. NBC produced a television episode about Fallingwater in 1963, and the house appeared in an episode of the TV show American Life Style and the PBS television special Walt Harper at Fallingwater in 1972. Fallingwater was also the subject of a 1994 documentary film. produced by Kenneth Love and the WPC, and another documentary in 2011, also produced by Love. Several books have been written about Fallingwater, including Frank Lloyd Wright's Fallingwater (1978) by Donald Hoffmann, Fallingwater: A Frank Lloyd Wright Country House (1986) by Edgar Kaufmann Jr., Fallingwater: Frank Lloyd Wright's Romance with Nature (1996) by the WPC, and Fallingwater Rising (2001) by Franklin Toker. To celebrate the house's 75th anniversary, another book about its history was published in 2011.

Photographs from downstream have been widely circulated. In addition, blueprints and letters from the house's development have been sold over the years. Virtual tours of Fallingwater have been created as well. One such tour was released in CD format in 1997, and Love created a 3-D virtual tour of the house in the mid-2010s. The house has been commemorated in other media, such as a postage-stamp issue from 1982. Fallingwater has been depicted in several creative works. For example, it inspired the fictional Vandamm residence in the 1959 film North by Northwest, in addition to buildings in Ayn Rand's 1943 novel The Fountainhead and its 1949 film adaptation. The conclusion of Greg Sestero's 2021 film Miracle Valley was shot inside of Fallingwater; according to Sestero, it was the first feature film to be shot in the house.

=== Awards and landmark designations ===
American architects deemed Fallingwater one of "seven wonders of American architecture" in a 1958 survey. A 1976 poll of American architects ranked it the country's third-best design, tied with the Dulles Main Terminal, while a 1982 poll of Architecture: the AIA journal readers ranked Fallingwater as the country's best building. In a survey of 170 American Institute of Architects (AIA) fellows the next year, the building was ranked second on a list of the "most successful examples of architectural design". AIA members voted Fallingwater the "best all-time work of American architecture" in 1991, and the AIA dubbed it the "building of the century" in 2000. AIA members also ranked Fallingwater 29th on the society's "America's Favorite Architecture" list in 2007.

The New York Times said in 1991 that architects considered Fallingwater "one of Wright's supreme creations". Architectural Record named Fallingwater "the world's most significant building of the 20th century", and Smithsonian listed the house among its "Life List of 28 Places to See Before You Die" in 2008. In 2025, Time Out magazine ranked Fallingwater among the world's most beautiful buildings, calling it "a masterclass in blending architecture with nature". The next year, Architectural Record magazine included Fallingwater on its list of "the most significant works of American architecture".

Fallingwater became a National Historic Landmark in 1966, and the house was separately added to the National Register of Historic Places in 1974. The Pennsylvania Historical and Museum Commission installed a historical marker in 1994 and named Fallingwater as a "Commonwealth Treasure" in October 2000. Fallingwater was deemed eligible for inclusion on UNESCO's World Heritage List in 2008, and the United States Department of the Interior nominated Fallingwater to the World Heritage List in 2015, alongside nine other buildings. UNESCO ultimately added eight properties, including Fallingwater, to the World Heritage List in July 2019 under the title "The 20th-Century Architecture of Frank Lloyd Wright".

=== Exhibits and architectural influence ===
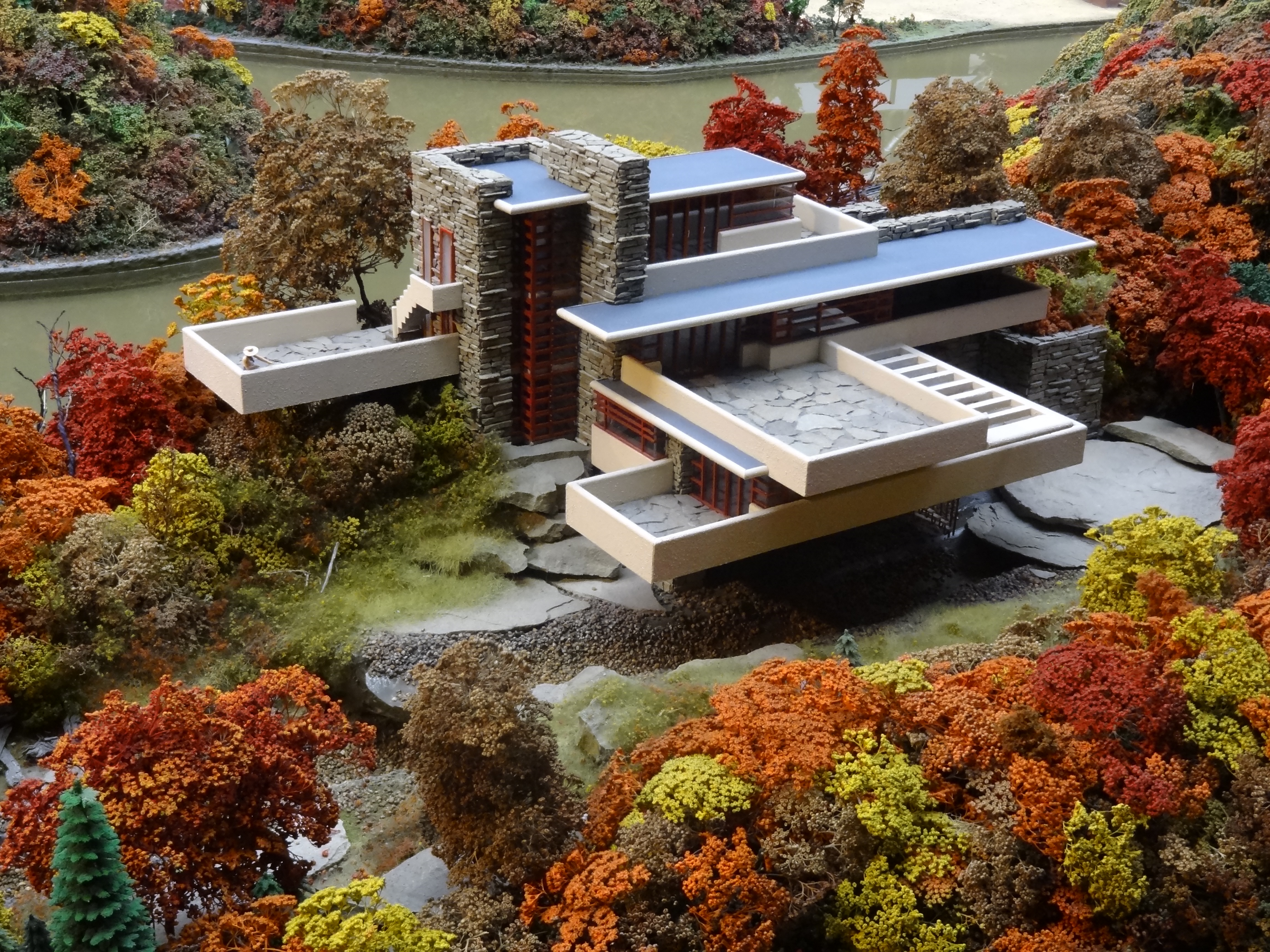
Replica of Fallingwater at the Miniature Railroad & Village at the Carnegie Science Center in Pittsburgh

There have also been museum exhibits about Fallingwater. Among them was a MoMA exhibit in 1938, which was organized when MoMA curator John McAndrew visited the house shortly after its completion. MoMA hosted other exhibits featuring Fallingwater, including a scale model in 1940, an image showcase in 1959, and another model in 2009. New York's Columbia University hosted a symposium on the structure in 1986, and Pittsburgh's Carnegie Museum of Art and the State Museum of Pennsylvania have hosted exhibits about Fallingwater. In addition, the Miniature Railroad & Village at Pittsburgh's Carnegie Science Center displays a model of Fallingwater.

Despite Fallingwater's renown, its design was seldom copied. At the time of the house's completion, modernist architects were turning away from organic designs, such as Fallingwater, in favor of more industrial designs, such as New York's Seagram Building. Among the structures inspired by Fallingwater are an office in Philadelphia; a gas station in the Washington metropolitan area; a home in Ross Township, Allegheny County; Paul Mayén's home in Garrison, New York; and a house in North Burnaby, British Columbia, Canada.

== See also ==
- List of Frank Lloyd Wright works
- List of National Historic Landmarks in Pennsylvania
- List of World Heritage Sites in the United States
- National Register of Historic Places listings in Fayette County, Pennsylvania
