= Erie Bluffs State Park =

State Park in Pennsylvania, United States

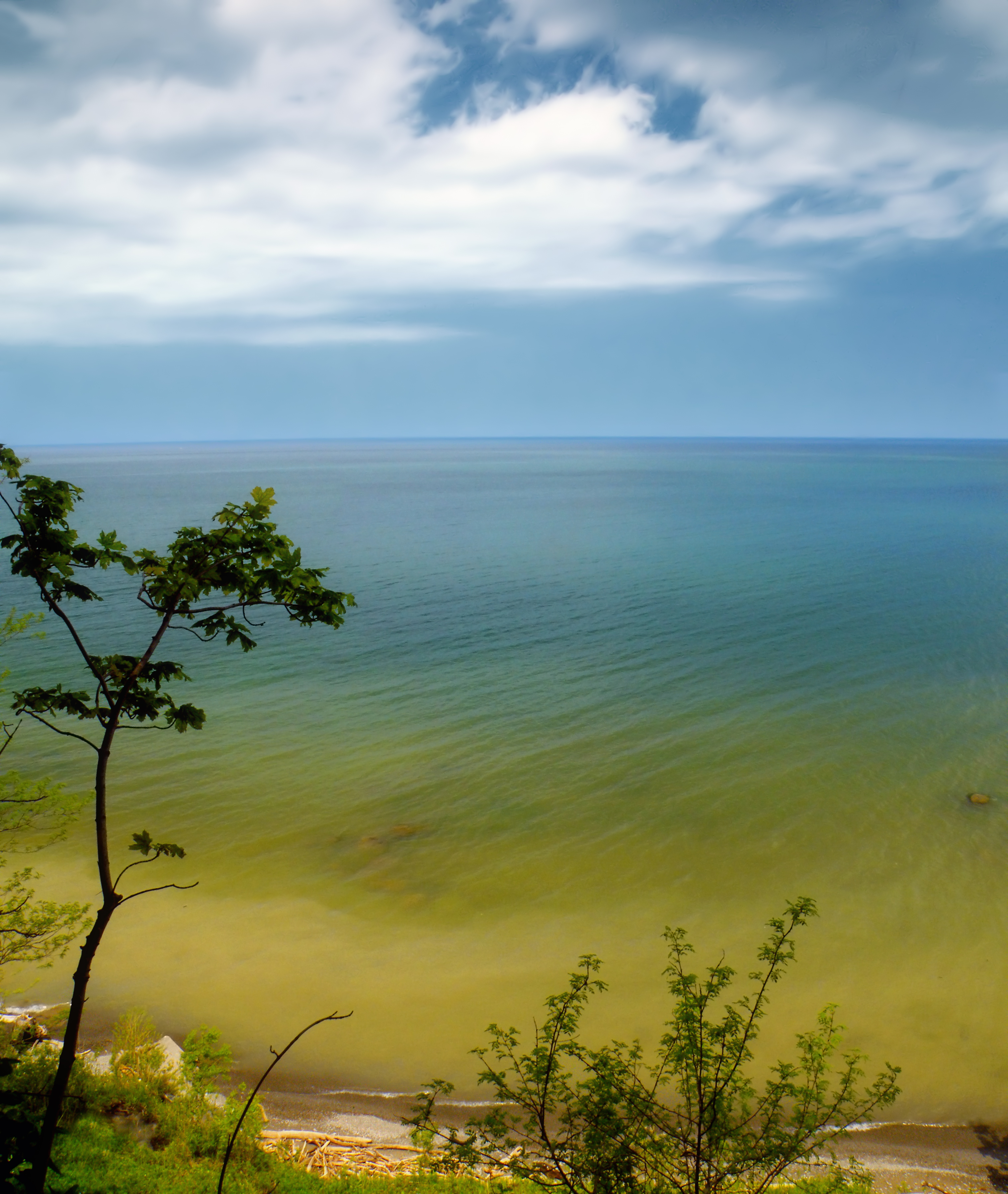
- Lake Erie as seen from the trail along the edge of the bluffs.

- Location within Pennsylvania Location within the United States
- Interactive map of Erie Bluffs State Park
- Location: Erie County, Pennsylvania, United States
- Coordinates: 42°00′59″N 80°22′19″W
- Area: 587 acres (238 ha)
- Elevation: 636 feet (194 m)
- Established: June 4, 2004
- Administrator: Pennsylvania Department of Conservation and Natural Resources
- Website: Official website
- Pennsylvania State Parks

Erie Bluffs State Park is a 587-acre (238 ha) Pennsylvania state park in Girard and Springfield Townships, Erie County, Pennsylvania in the United States. The park is the largest undeveloped stretch of land overlooking Lake Erie in Pennsylvania. Erie Bluffs State Park is just north of Pennsylvania Route 5 near Lake City and 12 miles (19 km) west of Erie. It is one of Pennsylvania's newest state parks.

The park was one of four Pennsylvania State Parks in the path of totality for the solar eclipse of April 8, 2024, with 3 minutes and 44 seconds of totality.

== Ecology ==
Most of the Lake Erie coastline in Pennsylvania is highly developed. Erie Bluffs State Park is the largest undeveloped stretch of coastline in Pennsylvania. It is therefore highly prized as an example of the wild nature that once stretched up and down the coast of Lake Erie. This 1 mile (1.6 km) stretch of coastline is at an elevation of 636 feet (194 m). It features bluffs approximately 90 feet (27 m) tall, patches of old-growth forest, rare, endangered and threatened plant species, a "world-class" steelhead fishery, a savanna ecosystem, wetlands and several archaeological sites.

The Pennsylvania Department of Conservation and Natural Resources in cooperation with the Western Pennsylvania Conservancy conducted a biological survey in the summer of 2004 at Erie Bluffs State Park. Their goal was to survey the forests, streams, and beaches of the park for every species of wild bird, fish, reptile, mammal, amphibian, plant, and insect that they could find. Biologists from Carnegie Museum, Shippensburg University of Pennsylvania, Gannon University, the Cleveland Museum of Natural History, the Pennsylvania Game Commission, the Pennsylvania Fish and Boat Commission, the Western Pennsylvania Conservancy and the Pennsylvania Department of Environmental Protection took part in the survey and found:

- 80 species of birds in the park included two bald eagles, a cerulean and hooded warbler, and an Acadian flycatcher.
- a colony of more than 3,000 bank swallow found nesting in the bluffs is believed to be one of the largest colonies of bank swallows in Pennsylvania
- 19 species of mammals, including white-tailed deer and red and gray foxes. The mammalogists noted that they did not find any Norway rats or house mice. This is significant because both animals are alien to the area and would only be present due to human development.
- 4 species of bats, including the European pipistrel, little brown bat, big brown bat and the red bat.
- 302 species of vascular plants and 92 species of fungi
- Entomologists found 477 taxa of land-dwelling insects, 172 species of butterflies and moths and 32 taxa of spiders.
- 33 species of land snails, 13 species of aquatic snails and mussels including the invasive zebra mussel
- 14 different reptiles and amphibians
- 7 species of fish

== History ==
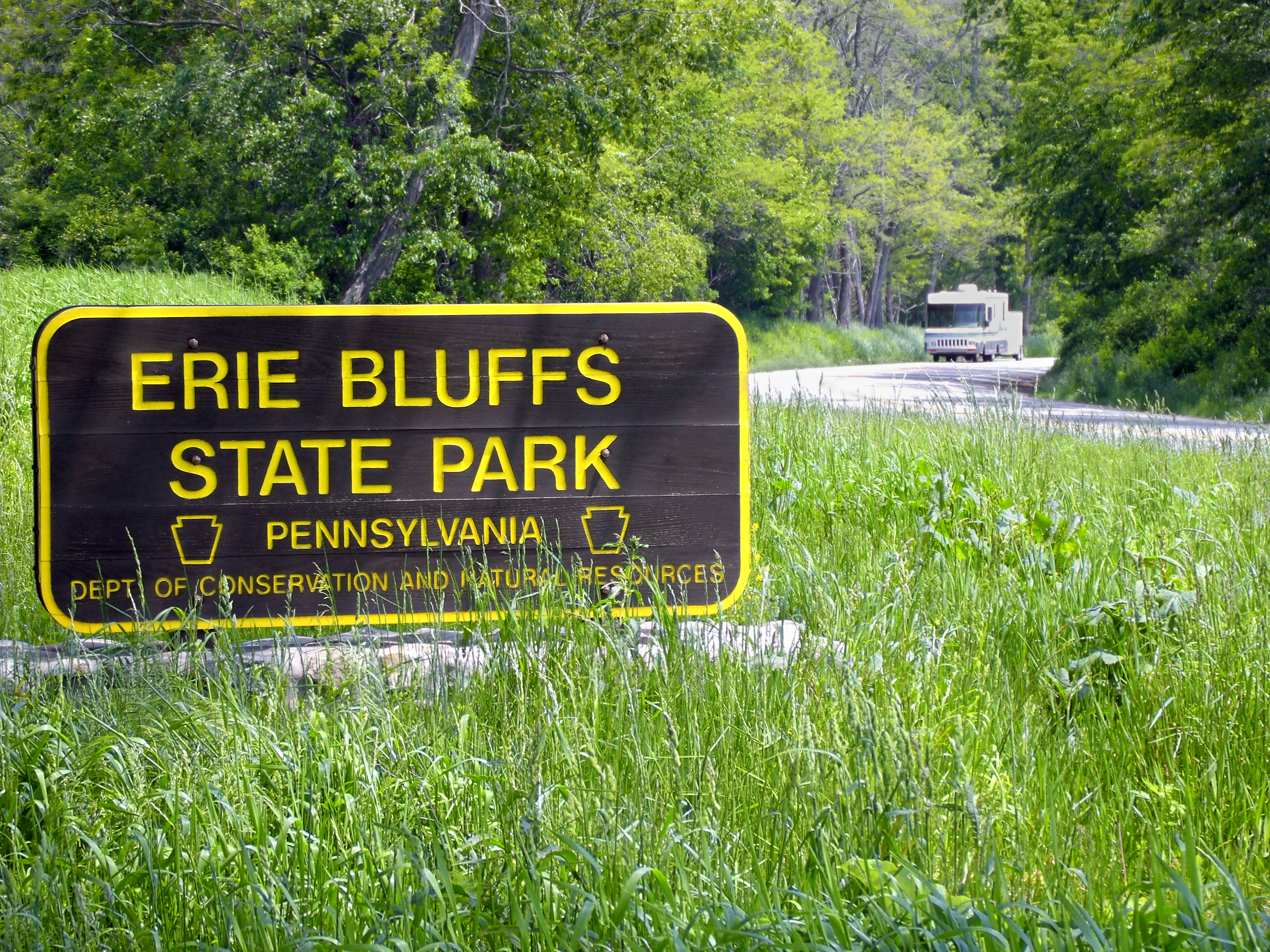
An Erie Bluffs State Park entrance sign

Erie Bluffs State Park was officially established as a Pennsylvania State Park on June 4, 2004. It became Pennsylvania's 117th state park. Pennsylvania Governor Edward G. Rendell stated, at the opening of the park,

This acquisition fulfills a decades-long vision to make this distinctive tract a state park to be enjoyed by Pennsylvania citizens and visitors to this region. With its spectacular scenic vistas over Lake Erie and an adjacent world-class shallow stream steelhead fishery, Erie Bluffs will prove to be a unique eco-tourism destination. Add Erie Bluffs to Presque Isle State Park and the Tom Ridge Environmental Center and you have a trifecta – a winning combination of recreational and educational experiences that will be an economic engine for this region. A visit to Erie will not be complete without a stop at all three locations.

The land on which Erie Bluffs State Park is located was acquired in 2004 by the Western Pennsylvania Conservancy from Reliant Energy. The conservancy then turned over ownership of the parklands to the Commonwealth of Pennsylvania, to be managed by the Pennsylvania Department of Conservation and Natural Resources.

== See also ==
- Erie Triangle
