= Bear Run =

Stream in Pennsylvania, US

Bear Run Tributary to Youghiogheny River
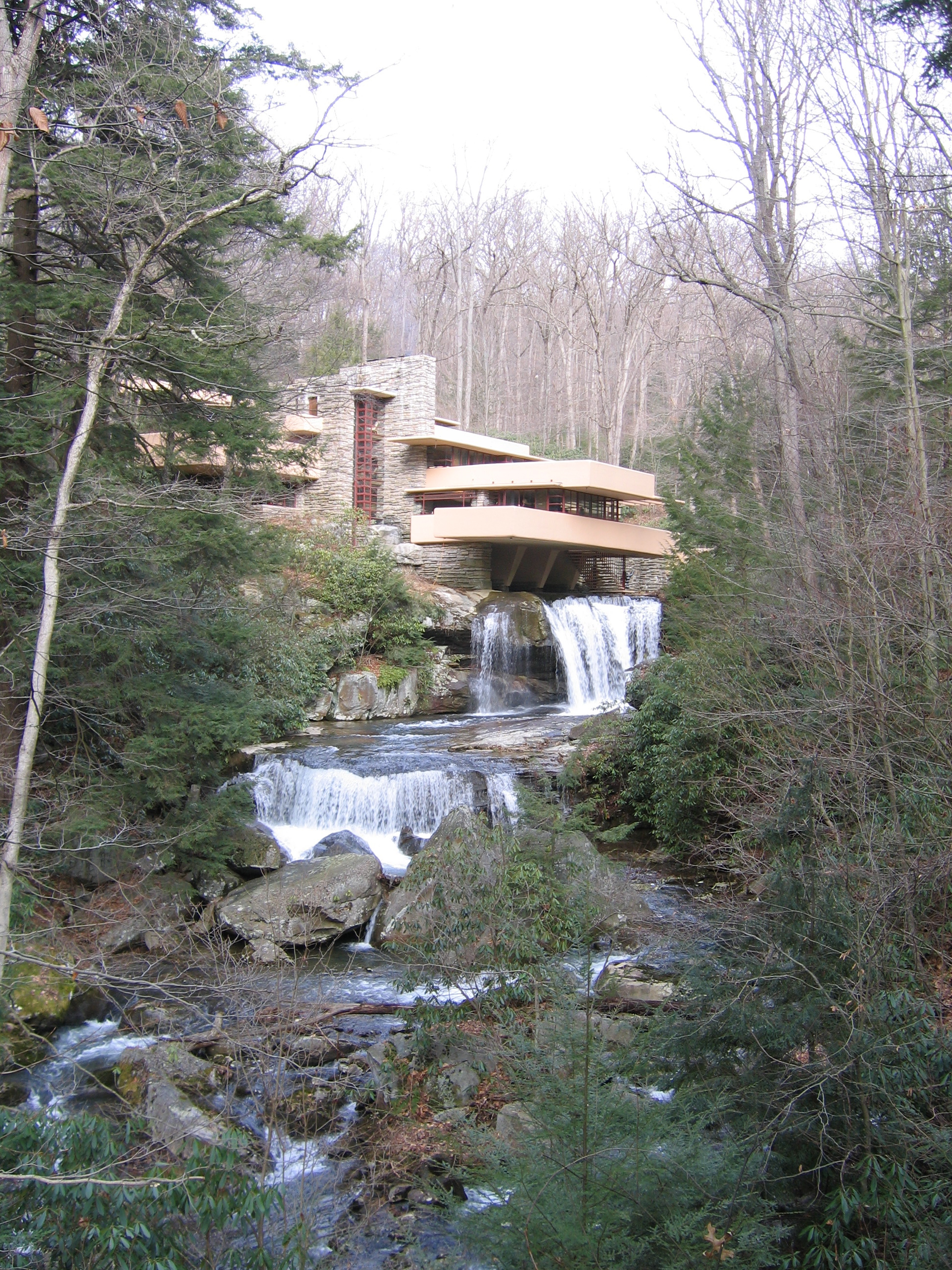
- Bear Run beneath Frank Lloyd Wright's Fallingwater

- Location of Bear Run mouth Bear Run (the United States)

Location
- Country: United States
- State: Pennsylvania
- County: Fayette

Physical characteristics
- Source: Fulton Run divide
  - location: about 3 miles northeast of Kaufmann, Pennsylvania
  - coordinates: 39°55′12″N 79°25′02″W
  - elevation: 2,370 ft (720 m)
- Mouth: Youghiogheny River
  - location: about 0.25 miles west of Kaufmann, Pennsylvania
  - coordinates: 39°54′11″N 79°29′28″W
  - elevation: 1,000 ft (300 m)
- Length: 4.56 mi (7.34 km)
- Basin size: 6.44 square miles (16.7 km^{2})
- Discharge
  - location: Youghiogheny River
  - average: 12.94 cu ft/s (0.366 m^{3}/s) at mouth with Youghiogheny River

Basin features
- Progression: southwest and west
- River system: Monongahela River
- Tributaries
  - left: unnamed tributaries
  - right: unnamed tributaries
- Bridges: PA 381

Bear Run is a 5.0-mile-long (8.0 km) tributary of the Youghiogheny River in Fayette County, Pennsylvania, United States.

Bear Run is in the Appalachian Mountains and part of the Pittsburgh metropolitan area. The Fallingwater house, designed by architect Frank Lloyd Wright, is located on this stream at the locality known as Mill Run.

Bear Run is inside the Bear Run Nature Reserve, protected by the Western Pennsylvania Conservancy. Bear Run is a designated Pennsylvania Scenic River. The nearest incorporated town is Ohiopyle, once a resort town for affluent Pittsburghers reaching the Ferncliff peninsula via rail. Ohiopyle today is the focal point of tourism in the Laurel Highlands, drawing many of the same visitors as Fallingwater, located a few miles away on PA State Route 381.

== Course ==
Bear Run rises about 3 miles northeast of Kaufmann, Pennsylvania, and then flows southwest and west to join the Youghiogheny River about 0.25 miles west of Kaufmann.

== Watershed ==
Bear Run drains 6.47 square miles (16.8 km^{2}) of area, receives about 48.1 in/year of precipitation, has a wetness index of 357.26, and is about 89% forested.

== Natural history ==
Bear Run is the location of Bear Run Watershed BDA. The large forested area of Bear Run, an exceptional value stream, provides habitat for three plant species of special concern.

== See also ==
- List of rivers of Pennsylvania
