= Springfield Township, Erie County, Pennsylvania =

Township in Pennsylvania, US

Coordinates: 41°58′00″N 80°30′29″W

Springfield Township
- Township
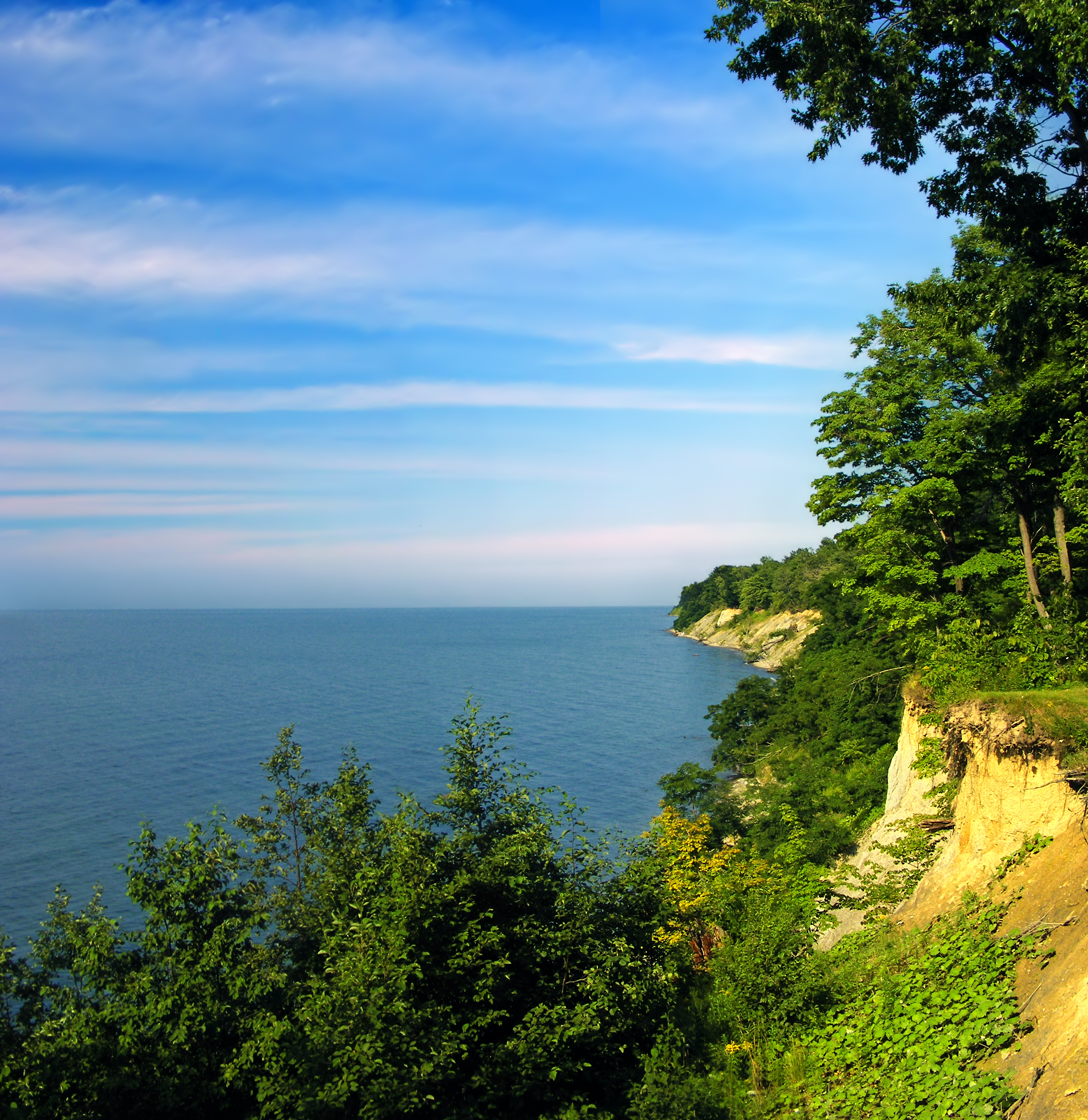
- Lake Erie bluffs as seen from the David M. Roderick Wildlife Reserve

- Location in Erie County and the U.S. state of Pennsylvania
- Country: United States
- State: Pennsylvania
- County: Erie

Area
  - Total: 37.66 sq mi (97.55 km^{2})
  - Land: 37.38 sq mi (96.82 km^{2})
  - Water: 0.28 sq mi (0.73 km^{2})
- Highest elevation (on Albion Road): 890 ft (270 m)
- Lowest elevation (Lake Erie): 572 ft (174 m)

Population (2020)
  - Total: 3,077
  - Estimate (2023): 3,015
  - Density: 88.9/sq mi (34.33/km^{2})
- Time zone: UTC-5 (EST)
  - Summer (DST): UTC-4 (EDT)
- Area code: 814
- FIPS code: 42-049-73048
- Website: https://springfieldtownshippa.com/

Springfield Township is a township in Erie County, Pennsylvania, United States. The population was 3,077 at the 2020 census, down from 3,425 at the 2010 census.

== Geography ==
Springfield Township is at the western end of Erie County, bordered to the north by Lake Erie, to the east by Girard Township, to the south by Conneaut Township, and to the west by the city of Conneaut, Ohio.

According to the United States Census Bureau, the township has a total area of 37.6 square miles (97.5 km^{2}), of which 37.4 square miles (96.8 km^{2}) is land and 0.27 square miles (0.7 km^{2}), or 0.74%, is water.

== History ==
Springfield's early history and development was tied to the construction of New York's Erie Canal in the early 19th century and the commerce that resulted from it. A notable example of its past is passage through Springfield for work related to the canal of James Hutchinson Woodworth, a former farmer and teacher from Onondaga County, New York, who was making his way west to Chicago, where he finally settled and eventually become mayor. William Blakely Holliday had a major impact on how the township was formed. He purchased land from the Native Americans in 1806 A.D. and eventually owned most of the eastern and northern parts of the township. The Holliday family still resides in North Springfield today.

== Demographics ==
Historical population
Census	Pop.	Note	%±
2000	3,378		—
2010	3,425		1.4%
2020	3,077		−10.2%
2023 (est.)	3,015		−2.0%
U.S. Decennial Census

As of the census of 2000, there were 3,378 people, 1,253 households, and 943 families residing in the township. The population density was 89.6 inhabitants per square mile (34.6/km^{2}). There were 1,462 housing units at an average density of 38.8 per square mile (15.0/km^{2}). The racial makeup of the township was 97.87% White, 0.62% African American, 0.21% Native American, 0.27% Asian, 0.27% from other races, and 0.77% from two or more races. Hispanic or Latino of any race were 0.56% of the population.

There were 1,253 households, out of which 34.3% had children under the age of 18 living with them, 59.9% were married couples living together, 10.6% had a female householder with no husband present, and 24.7% were non-families. 20.7% of all households were made up of individuals, and 8.0% had someone living alone who was 65 years of age or older. The average household size was 2.70 and the average family size was 3.11.

In the township the population was spread out, with 26.7% under the age of 18, 7.0% from 18 to 24, 29.3% from 25 to 44, 24.8% from 45 to 64, and 12.1% who were 65 years of age or older. The median age was 37 years. For every 100 females, there were 101.8 males. For every 100 females age 18 and over, there were 102.6 males.

The median income for a household in the township was $39,872, and the median income for a family was $42,352. Males had a median income of $36,491 versus $21,786 for females. The per capita income for the township was $17,389. About 6.6% of families and 9.3% of the population were below the poverty line, including 9.9% of those under age 18 and 11.1% of those age 65 or over.

== Notable people ==
- Caleb C. Harris, Wisconsin physician and politician, was born in the township.
- Jean Graetz, American civil rights activist, was born in the township.
