= Western Pennsylvania Conservancy =

American private nonprofit organization

Coordinates: 40°27′51.73″N 79°58′37.10″W

The Western Pennsylvania Conservancy (WPC) is a private nonprofit conservation organization founded in 1932 and headquartered in Pittsburgh, Pennsylvania. WPC has contributed land to 12 state parks and conserved more than 290,000 acres of natural lands. The Conservancy plants and maintains more than 130 gardens in 20 Western Pennsylvania counties, as well as planting tens of thousands of trees through its community forestry program. WPC has protected or restored more than 3,000 miles (4,800 km) of rivers and streams. In 1963, Edgar Kaufmann Jr. entrusted Frank Lloyd Wright's masterwork Fallingwater to the Conservancy. The house was called the most important building of the 20th century by the American Institute of Architects.

WPC is organized as a 501(c)(3) Public Charity. In 2024 it claimed $32,834,272 in total revenue, $28,888,562 in total expenses, and $139,538,974 in total assets. It reported giving of $51,802.

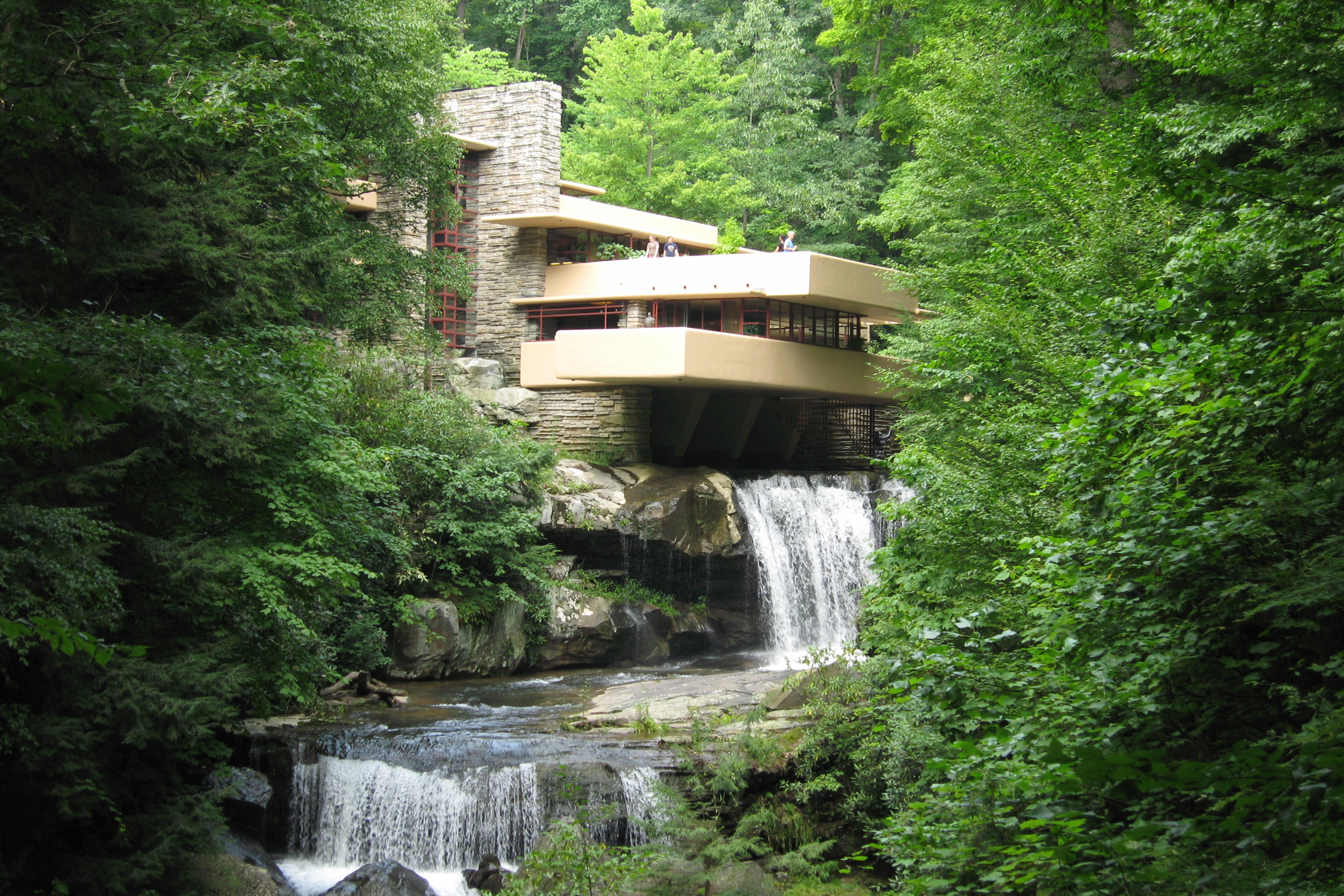
Fallingwater, maintained and preserved by the Western Pennsylvania Conservancy, is open to visitors.

== History ==
Three years into the Great Depression, ten citizens came together to found a nonprofit conservation organization. The organization’s goal was to alleviate widespread unemployment through public works programs that would also create a positive impact on the region’s natural resources. Formerly known as the Greater Pittsburgh Parks Association, WPC began its work landscaping a park along Pittsburgh's Bigelow Boulevard. By 1945, the Conservancy was acquiring large tracts of land in Lawrence County that eventually became part of McConnells Mill State Park. In 1961, a 300-acre wildflower reserve was acquired in Beaver County and is still considered to be one of the finest stands of native wildflowers in southwestern Pennsylvania. The wildflower reserve is now part of Raccoon Creek State Park.

== Offices ==
The Western Pennsylvania Conservancy's main headquarters is in Pittsburgh. The organization has several regional offices: Indiana, Mill Run, Ridgway, Franklin, Ligonier, Hollidaysburg and Harrisburg.

== Land and Water Conservation ==
The Conservancy has protected more than 290,000 acres of land since 1932. The Conservancy’s work enables protection of important natural resources and creates economic benefits through an area’s tourism, recreation and forestry. Most of the land preserved by WPC is now publicly owned, becoming some of Pennsylvania's premier parks, forests, game lands and natural areas, or subject to conservation easements that allow public access. WPC acquired land for the creation of 11 state parks, including:

- Ohiopyle State Park, including Ferncliff Peninsula National Natural Landmark
- Laurel Ridge State Park
- Oil Creek State Park
- McConnell's Mill State Park
- Moraine State Park
- Erie Bluffs State Park
- Canoe Creek State Park
- Cook Forest State Park
- Shawnee State Park
- Raccoon Creek State Park
- Clear Creek State Park

WPC also owns and manages nearly 15,000 acres of land on 45 nature preserves throughout Western Pennsylvania. Many of these natural areas offer hiking trails for the public to enjoy. Its largest natural area is Bear Run Nature Reserve in Fayette County, located down the road from Fallingwater. Totaling more than 5,100 acres, this nature preserve features 20 miles of hiking trails and several campsites.

WPC has also protected or restored more than 3,000 miles of waterways. Its watershed conservation work began as a technical assistance program for watershed groups in Western Pennsylvania. In 2011, the program was formalized to include a full suite of watershed restoration services for local communities. Currently, the Western Pennsylvania Conservancy's watershed conservation program offers in-stream monitoring and assessment, stream restoration and habitat improvement, abandoned mine drainage remediation, riparian buffer plantings, agricultural best management practices and other projects and surveys. The watershed conservation program also provides schools and students of all ages with hands-on educational presentations that help people understand the importance of clean water and healthy ecosystems in Pennsylvania.

== Community Gardens, Forestry and Greenspaces ==
WPC's community gardens and greenspace program plants and maintains 130 community gardens every spring in 20 Western Pennsylvania counties, with the help of approximately 10,000 volunteers annually. For many decades, the Conservancy has worked with PennDOT, municipalities and other local entities to transform vacant land into community flower gardens. Many gardens feature native perennial beds to support pollinator habitat, and several gardens feature rain gardens and bioswales to help mitigate stormwater runoff and filter pollutants.

WPC is also the managing partner of TreeVitalize Pittsburgh, a joint project of Allegheny County, City of Pittsburgh, Tree Pittsburgh, Pennsylvania Department of Conservation and Natural Resources and the Western Pennsylvania Conservancy. Since 2008, with the help of thousands of volunteers TreeVitalize Pittsburgh has planted more than 41,000 trees since 2024 to improve the quality of life and the environment in the Pittsburgh region, including in Justice40 areas, which are disadvantaged communities that are marginalized, underserved, and overburdened by pollution. Through this program, any Allegheny County resident may apply for trees on behalf of their community and all trees are planted on public property. Other community forestry projects led by the WPC include the Pittsburgh Redbud Project, Trees for Ligonier, and the Pittsburgh Street Tree Inventory.

The Conservancy’s School Grounds Greening program, in partnership with Pittsburgh Public Schools and supported by the Grable Foundation, PNC Grow Up Great and Richard King Mellon Foundation, has transformed concrete and/or grass-only areas into engaging, nature-focused outdoor play and greenspaces at nearly 80 schools in Pittsburgh and across the region since 2007. The projects provide outdoor classrooms, natural play spaces and low-care plantings to provide shade, landscape accents and natural points of interest for children.

Since 2005, with funding from Laurel Foundation, WPC grows, hangs and cares for more than 400 flower baskets that beautify bridges and major streets of the Golden Triangle during spring and summer months. Since 2008, with funding from Colcom Foundation, WPC plants and maintains seasonal flower displays in more than 400 large planters that line the streets of downtown Pittsburgh year round.

== Biodiversity Conservation and Conservation Science ==
The Western Pennsylvania Conservancy uses science as an essential tool to prioritize the places that it seeks to protect and set long-term conservation goals. Through its conservation science program and the Pennsylvania Natural Heritage Program (PNHP), WPC scientists provide scientific information, expertise and assistance to support the conservation of Pennsylvania's biological diversity.

The PNHP is a partnership of the Pennsylvania Department of Conservation and Natural Resources, the WPC, and the Pennsylvania Game Commission and the Pennsylvania Fish and Boat Commission. Established in 1981, PNHP is responsible for the inventory and monitoring of threatened and endangered species of (both state and federal) and natural communities. The program also maintains the Pennsylvania Natural Diversity Inventory (PNDI) database, which contains records for threatened, endangered and other listed species and communities.

== Fallingwater ==
The Frank Lloyd Wright-designed Fallingwater house, perched over the Bear Run waterfall at Mill Run, Pennsylvania, is an internationally renowned architectural landmark. Fallingwater was entrusted to the Conservancy by Edgar Kaufmann Jr. in October 1963. Included with this gift was more than 460 acres of surrounding land known as Bear Run Nature Reserve, now expanded to more than 5,100 acres. The Kaufmann family became acquainted with the Conservancy when they were involved with the early acquisition of Ferncliff Peninsula, later to become the cornerstone of Ohiopyle State Park.

Received under a deed of trust, the donation requires the Conservancy to preserve and maintain the buildings. In 2013, more than 160,000 people visited the house and grounds of Fallingwater, and Fallingwater’s total visitation has surpassed six million guests since it opened to the public in 1964.

On July 10, 2019, the United Nations Educational, Scientific and Cultural Organization (UNESCO) World Heritage Committee inscribed Fallingwater and seven other Frank Lloyd Wright-designed sites to the UNESCO World Heritage List at a meeting in Baku, Azerbaijan.

The inscription, The 20th-Century Architecture of Frank Lloyd Wright, to the UNESCO World Heritage List represents the first modern architecture designations in the United States.

Guided tours are offered daily from March through November, except Wednesdays, and weekends during December.

== See also ==
- Pennsylvania Historical and Museum Commission
- List of Pennsylvania state parks
- Conservation
- Architectural conservation
