= Radziner =

Radziner or Radzyner may refer to:

- Radziner Chassidim, followers of the Izhbitza – Radzin (Hasidic dynasty)
- Ron Radziner, a principal of Los Angeles-based architectural firm Marmol Radziner
- Radzyner Law School, at the Interdisciplinary Center in Herzliya, Israel
- Joanna Radzyner, an Austrian journalist
