= Kaufmann House =

Kaufmann House may refer to either of two houses commissioned by Edgar J. Kaufmann:

- Fallingwater in Pittsburgh, Pennsylvania, designed by Frank Lloyd Wright in 1935.
- Kaufmann Desert House in Palm Springs, California, designed by Richard Neutra in 1946.
