= Edgar Kaufmann =

Edgar Kaufmann may refer to:

- Edgar J. Kaufmann (1885–1955), Jewish German-American businessman and philanthropist
- Edgar Kaufmann Jr. (1910–1989), American architect, author, and professor
