= Edgar Kaufmann Jr. =

American architect and academic (1910–1989)

- Born: Edgar Jonas Kaufmann Jr. April 9, 1910; Pittsburgh, Pennsylvania
- Died: July 31, 1989 (aged 79); Manhattan, New York
- Education: School for Arts and Crafts; Taliesin East
- Occupations: Educator and author in architectural studies
- Partner: Paul Mayén
- Parent(s): Edgar J. Kaufmann; Lilian S. Kaufmann

Edgar Kaufmann Jr. (stylized as Edgar Kaufmann jr.; April 9, 1910 – July 31, 1989) was an American educator, lecturer, author, and an adjunct professor of architecture and art history at Columbia University.

== Biography ==
He was the son of Edgar J. Kaufmann, a wealthy Pittsburgh businessman and philanthropist who owned Kaufmann's department store, and his wife Liliane. Kaufmann Jr. attended the School for Arts and Crafts at the Austrian Museum of Applied Art in Vienna, in the late 1920s. He studied painting and typography for three years with Victor Hammer in Florence. After reading Frank Lloyd Wright's autobiography, Kaufmann decided to become a resident apprentice in architecture at Wright's Taliesin East School and Studio in 1933. He was asked to leave in 1935 because of his homosexuality, possibly by Wright himself. Kaufmann preferred to stylize his name as "Edgar Kaufmann jr.", spelling the suffix using lowercase letters.

When he left Wright's Taliesin Fellowship in 1935, he joined the family business and became merchandise manager for home furnishings, and in 1938, was elected secretary of the Kaufmann Department Stores, Inc. In 1940, Edgar wrote to Alfred Barr of the Museum of Modern Art, proposing the Organic Design in Home Furnishings Competition, won by Charles Eames and Eero Saarinen. That same year, he left Kaufmann's to join the Museum of Modern Art.

He served with the Army Air Forces from 1942 to 1946 during World War II. Afterwards, he was director of the Industrial Design Department at the Museum of Modern Art (MOMA) in New York City. While there, he had a relationship with the architecture curator, John McAndrew. Edgar's greatest accomplishment during his tenure at MOMA was the 'Good Design' program of 1950 to 1955, in which the museum joined with the Merchandise Mart in Chicago, promoting good design in household objects and furnishings. His Edgar J. Kaufmann Foundation also hired Finnish architect Alvar Aalto to design the Kaufmann Conference Center in New York City, which was completed in 1964.

From 1963 to 1986, Kaufmann was an adjunct professor of Architecture and Art History at Columbia University. He authored several books on Wright architecture and modern design, and was a contributor to Arts + Architecture journal and Encyclopædia Britannica.

=== Personal life ===
Kaufmann strongly supported his father's decision to commission Frank Lloyd Wright for the famous 1936 Fallingwater house over Bear Run, in Stewart Township, Pennsylvania. After his father's death in 1955, Kaufmann inherited the Fallingwater house, continuing to use and share it as a mountain retreat until 1963. Then, he entrusted the Wright structures and several hundred acres of the surrounding pristine Laurel Highlands lands in the Allegheny Mountains to the Western Pennsylvania Conservancy as an architectural house museum and conservation open space preserve, in memory of his parents. Kaufmann was also among the public figures at the core of the effort to save Olana, the home of Frederic Edwin Church, before it was designated a National Historic Landmark in 1965 and subsequently became a New York State Historic Site.

Kaufmann, who did not marry and had no children, died in 1989. His ashes were scattered around the property at Fallingwater by his partner Paul Mayén, with whom he had shared his life since the 1950s. Mayén oversaw the building of the Fallingwater pavilion from 1979 to 1981, which houses the café, gift store, and visitor's center at Fallingwater. Following his own death in 2000, Mayén's ashes were also scattered at Fallingwater in accordance with his wishes.

After his death, 21 pieces of his collection of art and sculpture were auctioned off at Sotheby's in New York. They included Mondrian's Facade in Tan and Grey and Composition in a Square, Klee's Face of a Flower, Picasso's Guitar and Pink Fruit Dish, Braque's Harlequin, a Matisse's Nude With Pink Shoes, Léger's Forms in Contrast and Acrobats, de Kooning's Untitled III, Calder's Little Tree, Monet's Waterlilies, Duchamp's Small Horse, Giacometti's Woman With a Broken Shoulder, and Miró's Bird Flying Toward a Silver Tree.
