= Edgar J. Kaufmann Conference Center =

Conference hall in New York City

Coordinates: 40°45′04″N 73°58′06″W

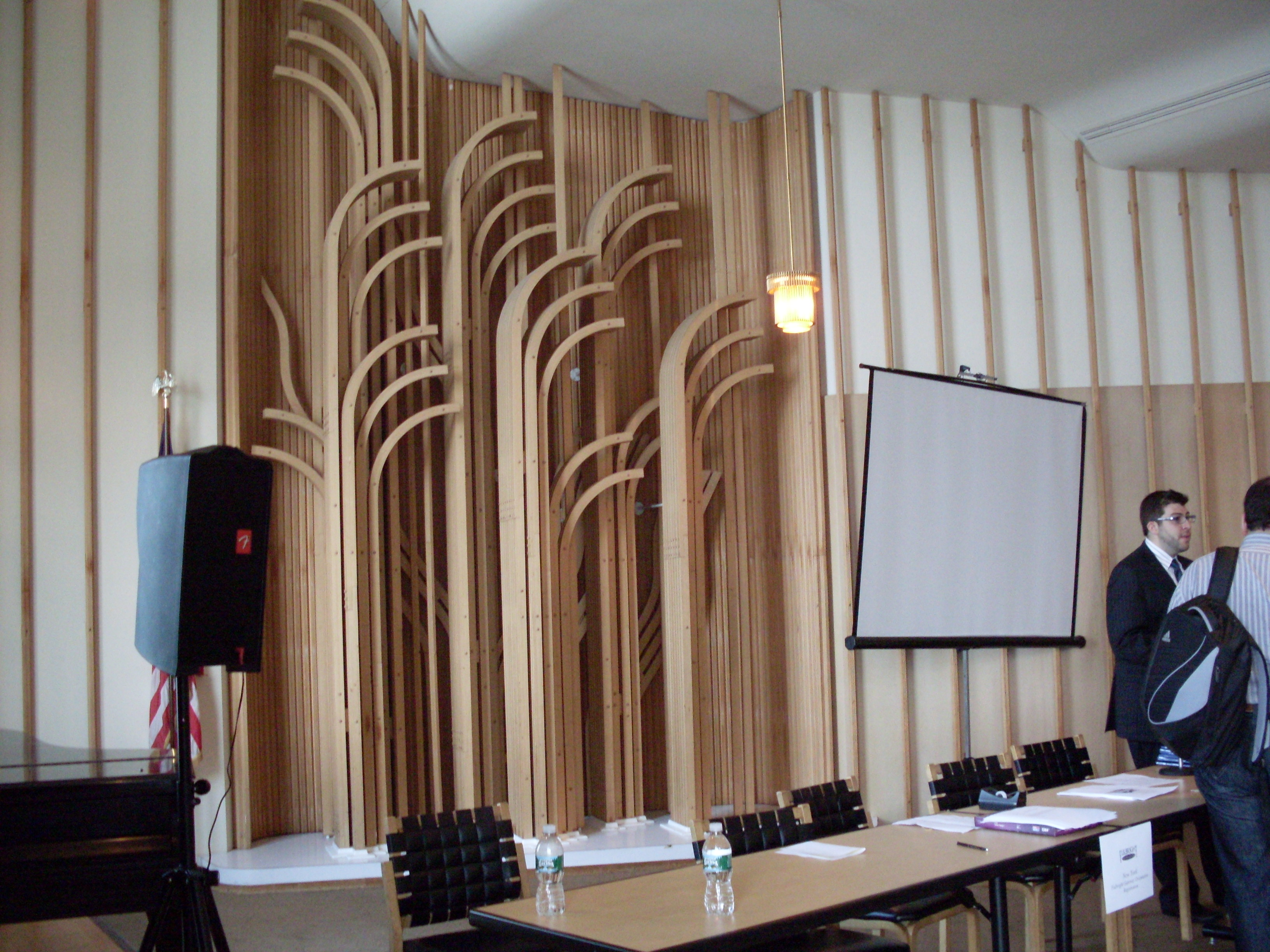
The birch rods on the walls of the Kaufmann Conference Center, retracted during an event

The Edgar J. Kaufmann Conference Center is a conference hall on the 12th floor of 809 United Nations Plaza in the Turtle Bay neighborhood of Manhattan in New York City. Designed by Finnish architect Alvar Aalto for professor Edgar Kaufmann Jr., it is one of four remaining designs by Aalto in the United States. The conference center was announced in 1962, during the construction of the Institute of International Education (IIE)'s headquarters, and was dedicated in December 1964. After the building was sold in 1998 to a group backed by Japanese financiers, there were several unsuccessful attempts to preserve the conference center as a New York City designated landmark.

The conference center includes an elevator lobby, a reception hall, and two smaller conference rooms. The 4,500-square-foot (420 m^{2}) reception hall contains birch rods, which Aalto characterized as resembling "spaghetti", as well as a sloping ceiling. Folding partition walls divided the reception hall from the smaller conference rooms. Aalto, working with his wife Elissa, designed various pieces of furniture within the conference center, which were largely manufactured in Finland.

== Description ==
The Kaufmann Conference Center was designed by the Finnish architect Alvar Aalto for the architecture professor Edgar Kaufmann Jr.. The conference hall is on the 12th floor of 809 United Nations Plaza, originally the headquarters of the Institute of International Education (IIE), at First Avenue and 45th Street in the Turtle Bay neighborhood of Manhattan in New York City. The conference center is located just across First Avenue from the United Nations General Assembly Building. It is one of Aalto's four remaining designs in the United States and his only design in New York City. The Kaufmann Conference Center, along with the Woodberry Poetry Room at Harvard University, are the only interior spaces in the U.S. designed by Aalto. Before the Kaufmann Conference Center was completed, Aalto's only other work in the U.S. (excluding demolished buildings) was Baker House at the Massachusetts Institute of Technology.

=== Rooms ===
The conference center includes a tiled lobby, a reception hall, and two smaller conference rooms. Access is via three elevators and two stairs near the north end of the 12th story. The reception hall occupies most of the eastern end of the 12th story, while the two conference rooms are to the west and southwest of the reception hall.

==== Elevator lobby ====
The wall of the 12th-story elevator lobby contains dark blue tiles on a cement-plaster background, which are laid in a vertical pattern. Each of the elevator lobby's tiles is made of porcelain and has a horseshoe-shaped cross section. The wall itself is angled obliquely, a design element meant to draw visitors into the lecture hall. The hallway is clad with cobalt tiles, which are used to highlight the doorways. The hallway connects with a 4,500-square-foot (420 m^{2}) reception hall which can be divided into a 300-seat lecture hall and two meeting spaces.

==== Reception hall ====
The reception hall is decorated in ivory and white with black accents. The walls are paneled with blond birch wood. One wall contains birch rods, which are curved at their tops and were created using a bentwood technique. Aalto characterized these rods as resembling "spaghetti", since they resembled inverted hockey sticks or the branches of a tree. Aalto had wanted to install a large "forest" of rods, but New York City fire regulations only permitted a limited number of rods. The other walls contain vertical birch battens, which are placed on the ash paneling at regular intervals. Each vertical birch batten reaches from the floor to the ceiling and is composed of 61 rods arranged in a hexagonal pattern. The centers of each group of battens are spaced 12 inches (300 mm) apart. The eastern wall, which overlooks the headquarters of the United Nations, is made of glass and contains a grille to reduce glare.

The ceiling is made of white plaster and reaches up to 22 feet (6.7 m) high. The wavy surface of the ceiling slopes upward from its lowest point, near the reception hall's entrance, to its highest point, near the windows. The mechanical systems above the room were relocated to accommodate this design . Progressive Architecture described the reception hall as a place where "space and light burst outward and upward". A freestanding column, the only one in the reception hall, is placed next to the eastern wall. In front of this column is a semicircular white wall, which surrounds a speaker's rostrum.

==== Smaller conference rooms ====
The two smaller conference rooms have flatter walls and are separated from the reception hall by folding partition walls. The moving partitions could be activated by a hidden lever. At the south end of the reception hall is a smaller room, which contains hexagonal battens on its walls. The outer walls of the smaller conference rooms also contain hexagonal battens. Kaufmann's involvement with the rooms' details extended to exposed brass screws in each room. The screws at the bottoms of the battens are parallel to the floor, but the screws in electrical outlets and switch plates are perpendicular to the floor.

=== Furniture ===
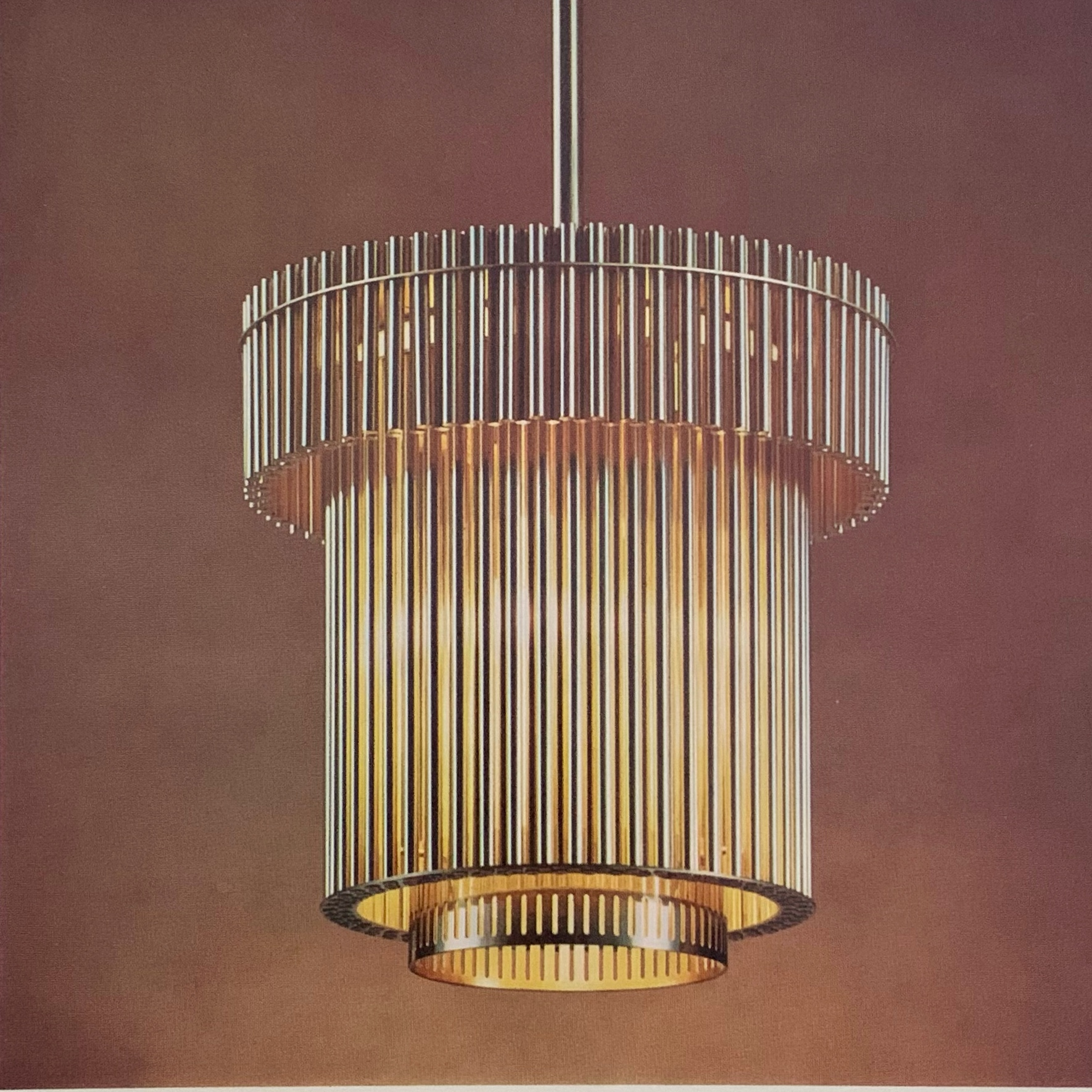
Chandelier in the Kaufmann Conference Center

Aalto, working with his wife Elissa, designed various pieces of furniture within the conference center. These include birch chairs upholstered with black leather, as well as a movable bar. The birch chairs were meant to complement the color scheme of the walls in the lobby and the reception hall. In addition, the conference center contains side chairs with reflective quilting on their backs. Elissa Aalto designed brown rugs for the space as well. Most of the design elements were made in Finland. Many spare pieces of decoration were stored in the IIE building's basement.

There are vase-shaped shades, gold-plated chandeliers, upright lamps, and molded door handles made of bronze. The lighting fixtures contained gold-plated copper and leather, creating a sparkling effect. Each chandelier contains clusters of small rods arranged in concentric circles. The light passes through a metal filter at the bottom of each chandelier; according to Aalto, it took half a year to design this feature. The chandeliers near the reception hall's eastern wall are designed with white reflectors to admit more natural light. The lighting fixtures were created by 70 men who worked in Aalto's factory.

== History ==
=== Creation ===
When Henry Cabot Lodge Jr. was elected as a trustee to the Institute of International Education in 1961, the IIE was considering constructing a building on First Avenue between 45th and 46th Streets at a cost of $4.5 million. In early 1962, the IIE announced plans for its new 14-story headquarters, designed by the firm of Harrison, Abramovitz & Harris. The building would be a glass-walled structure with about 100,000 square feet (9,300 m^{2}) of floor space. In particular, this structure was to contain a 300-person meeting area on the 12th story "for concerts, lectures and dinners". The cornerstone of the building was laid on October 24, 1963. The building, completed in 1964, was characterized by architect Robert A. M. Stern as a "straightforward" edifice.

The academic Edgar Kaufmann Jr. proposed a conference center in the IIE building, both to entertain visitors from other countries and to host conferences with up to 300 attendees. His organization, the Edgar J. Kaufmann Foundation, donated a conference center to the IIE. Kaufmann hired Alvar Aalto to design the conference center. Harrison, Abramovitz & Harris collaborated with Aalto in the design of the conference center, since the project involved structural modifications to the IIE building. At Kaufmann's request, Aalto manufactured most of the design elements in Finland. The conference center was completed in December 1964. Upon the center's completion, architectural critic Ada Louise Huxtable wrote that the 12th floor had been "transformed for an undisclosed and probably formidable price into the most beautiful and distinguished interior that New York has seen in many years. A landmark is gained."

=== Sale and preservation efforts ===
In 1998, the IIE sold the building to Foundation for the Support of the United Nations (FSUN), a group backed by Japanese financiers. The IIE retained seven stories in the building and was allowed to use the conference center 30 days a year. After the sale, the New York City Landmarks Preservation Commission (LPC) was considering designating the room as an interior landmark. The agency's rules mandated that interior landmarks had to be public spaces, but the Kaufmann Conference Center could only be accessed by invitation. By 2000, FSUN was planning to convert the Kaufmann Conference Center into offices. At the time, FSUN estimated that the space could earn more than $2 million a year if it were rented out as office space. FSUN offered to sell the conference center's decorations to anyone who was willing to remove them. The Preservation League of New York State put the rooms on a list of "threatened historic sites". The LPC convinced FSUN to temporarily refrain from selling off the conference center until the commission could hold a hearing on the rooms.

FSUN ultimately withdrew their offer to sell the conference center in June 2001. Following the September 11 attacks in 2001, public access to 809 United Nations Plaza was restricted because of security concerns, since the building contained two countries' missions to the United Nations. The LPC held public hearings on the rooms in 2001 and again in 2002. Preservationists wrote over 30 letters in support of designating the rooms as a landmark. According to The New York Times, the letters described the center as having hosted such events as "wedding receptions, a three-day Scandinavian Christmas party and a reception for the king and queen of Spain". The IIE continued to rent out the Kaufmann Conference Center for events until 2008, when the conference center was temporarily converted into offices.

In late 2015, the LPC again hosted a public hearing on whether to designate the Kaufmann Conference Center as an interior landmark. This was part of a review of 95 listings that had been calendared by the LPC for several decades but never approved as city landmarks. The LPC rejected the interior-landmark designation in February 2016 because the interior was a private space, and the LPC could only give interior-landmark designation to spaces that were ordinarily open to the public.
