= Malibu Country Mart =

Coordinates: 34.035950°N 118.686059°W

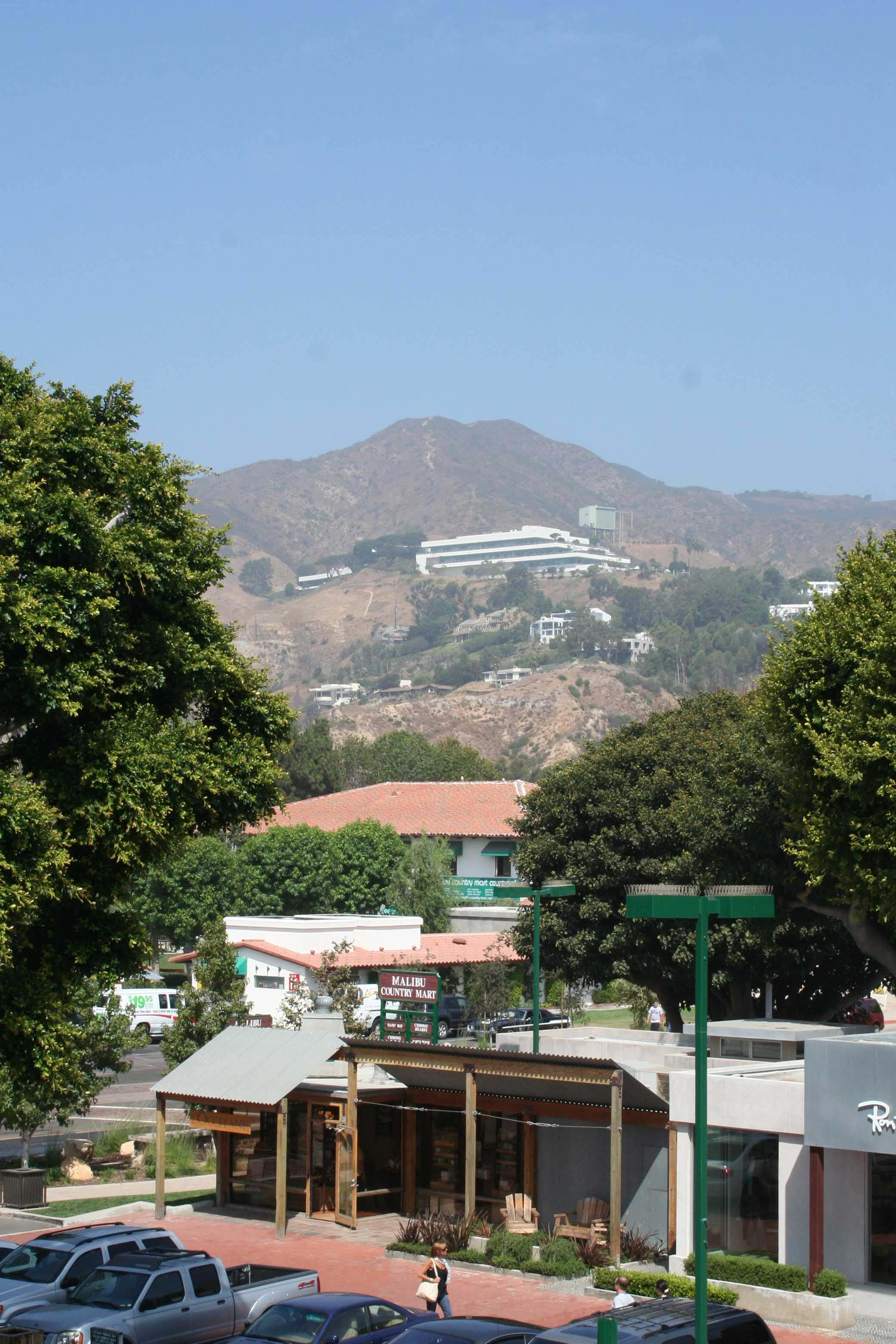
- View of the Malibu Country Mart
- Location: Malibu, California, United States
- Address: 3835 Cross Creek Road
- Owner: Koss Real Estate Investments
- Num. of stores: 67
- Floor area: Approx. 82,000 square feet (7,600 m^{2})
- Floors: 1-2
- Website: malibucountrymart.com

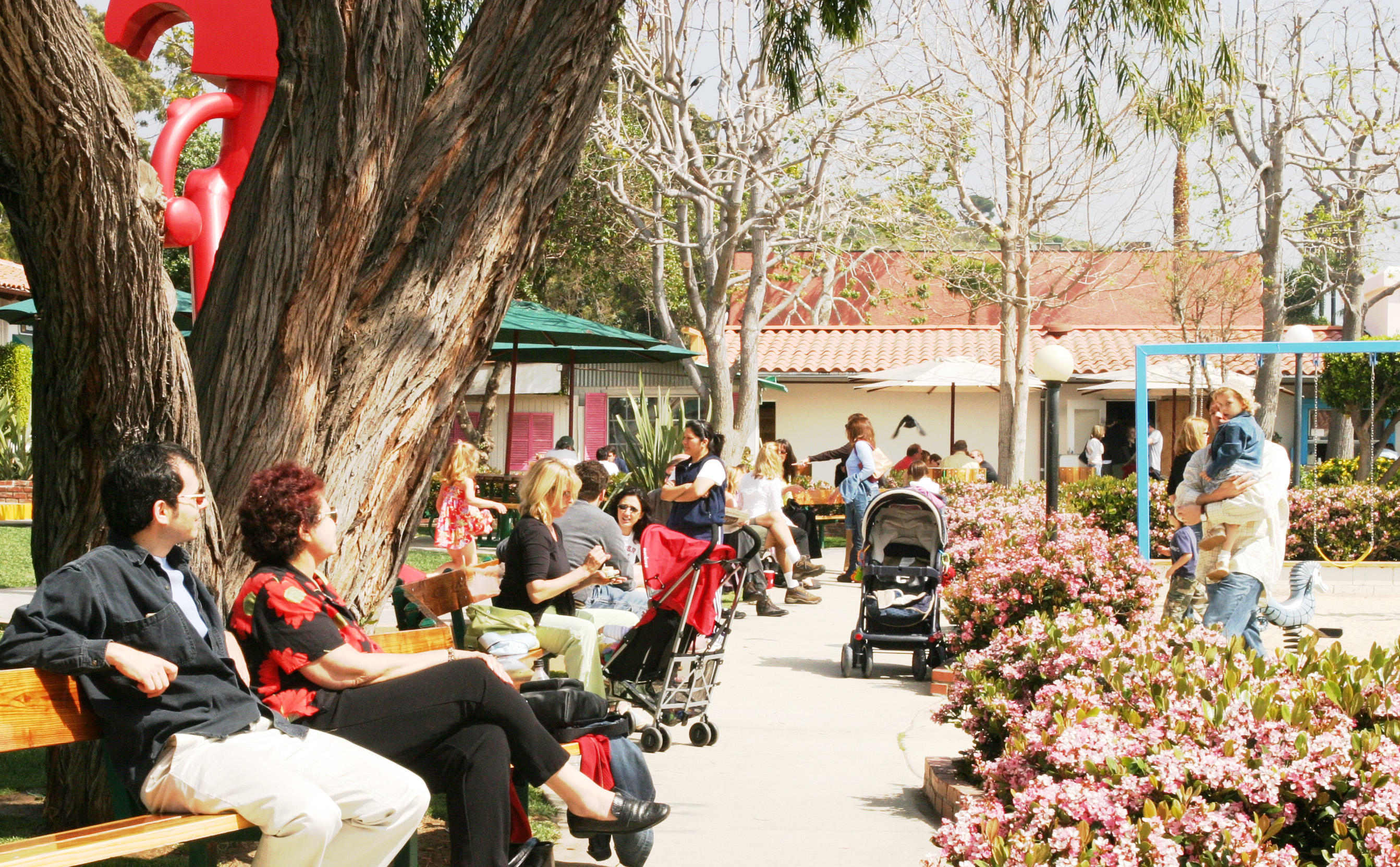
Families at the Malibu Country Mart

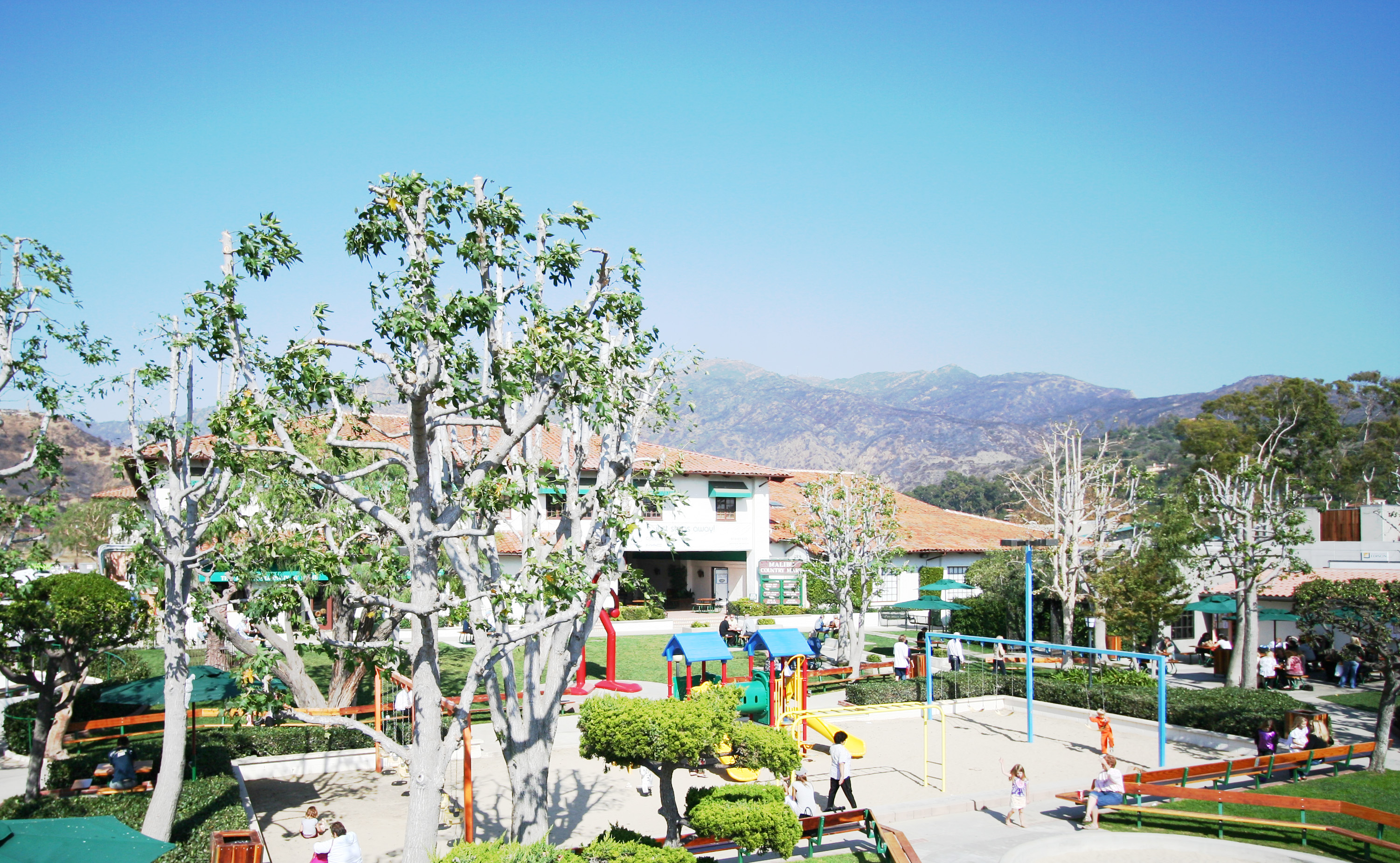
The Playground, Picnic, and Courtyard Areas

The Malibu Country Mart (also the Country Mart or MCM) is a large outdoor lifestyle center or "boutique mall" located in the heart of Malibu at the Civic Center of Malibu, California. The center features a popular public playground, outdoor dining and picnic area, unique sculptures and public art, multiple restaurant options, free Wi-Fi, and on-site parking.

== Description ==
The Malibu Country Mart encompasses 6 acres (24,000 m^{2}) of land in the heart of the Malibu Civic Center and comprises approximately 90,000 square feet (8,400 m^{2}) of high-end retail, dining, and service providers. Its buildings are a mix of architectural styles, displaying Spanish, Mediterranean, modern, and rustic influences. Other features of the property include unique gardens and sculptures, outdoor dining and picnic areas, and a children's playground.

Because of its retailers, the Malibu Country Mart has been a destination for the famous and locals. The Malibu Civic Center area is the primary local gathering place, frequented by locals and visitors. Some reports suggest that the area has also become an increasingly popular venue for paparazzi.

Limited development and high demand continue to lead to rising real estate prices, and in turn lead to a market in which each successive generations of property buyers is typically wealthier than the one that preceded them. These demographic trends help to explain both a burgeoning market for luxury goods and a diminishing market for prosaic and practical homegoods. Some in Malibu are said to express concern that there will be a "multitude of places to buy a $200 t-shirt, but no place to buy a hammer or a nail."

== Location ==
The Malibu Country Mart is located one block off the Pacific Coast Highway in the heart of the Malibu Civic Center, minutes away from Pepperdine University, Malibu High School (MHS), and the Malibu Pier.

The property is approximately 20 minutes from West Los Angeles, the City of Santa Monica, the San Fernando Valley, and the Conejo Valley.

== Ownership ==
The property was purchased in 1986 by Koss Companies, now known as Koss Real Estate Investments.

=== Malibu Legacy Park Project ===
Directly adjacent to the Malibu Country Mart is a currently vacant, 20-acre (81,000 m^{2}) plot of land formerly owned by billionaire media tycoon and Colony resident Jerry Perenchio and sold to the City of Malibu in 2005 with strict deed restrictions prohibiting any commercial use.

Current plans for the site involve the development of a state-of-the-art park that is said to work as an "environmental cleaning machine", reducing pollution impacts in Malibu Creek, Malibu Lagoon, and the world-famous Surfrider Beach while simultaneously improving water quality, restoring a native riparian habitat, and preserving open space. The project will be linked by a "linear park" to the neighboring Surfrider Beach, Malibu Pier, Malibu Lagoon, and Malibu Bluffs Park.

Between Cross Creek Road and Webb Way east to west, and between Civic Center Way and PCH north to south, it has been the site of the annual Labor Day Weekend Chili Cook-Off festival since 1982.

== Tenants ==
The Malibu Country Mart has 67 merchants encompassing a variety of upscale boutiques, restaurants, spa services, and art galleries. Many new tenants have signed leases at the Malibu Country Mart in recent years.

=== Retailers ===
- All Things Bell
- ba&sh
- Bleusalt
- Brandy Melville
- Chrome Hearts
- Faherty Brand
- John Varvatos
- M.FREDRIC
- Malibu Colony Co.
- PAIGE
- Ralph Lauren
- Ron Herman
- Sunroom
- Tobi Tobin
- Vince
- Vuori
- Madhappy

=== Dining ===
- Tra di Noi
- Taverna Tony
- Lucky's Steakhouse
- John's Garden
- Starbucks
- SunLife Organics
- Malibu Mutt's Grill
- Malibu Kitchen

== Gallery ==
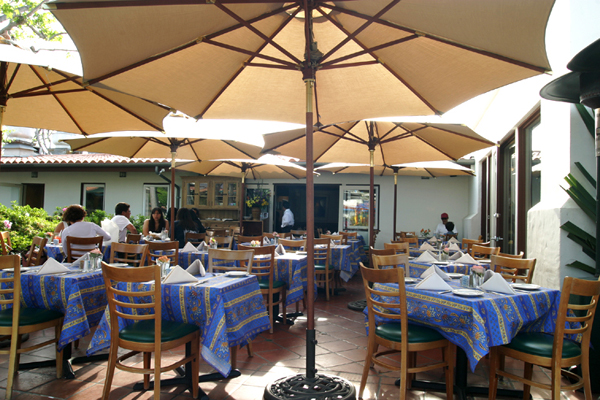
Tra di Noi

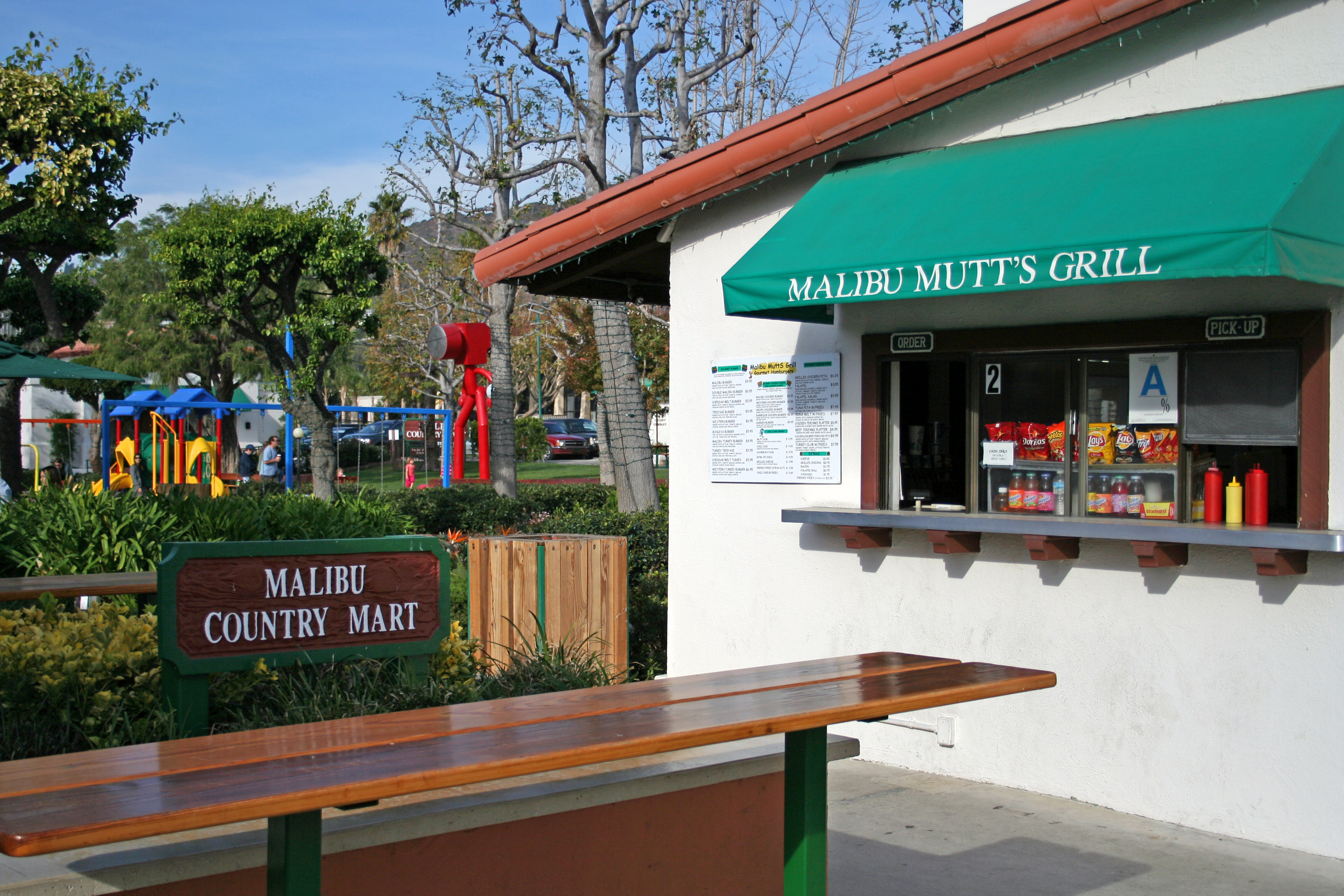
Malibu Mutt's Grill

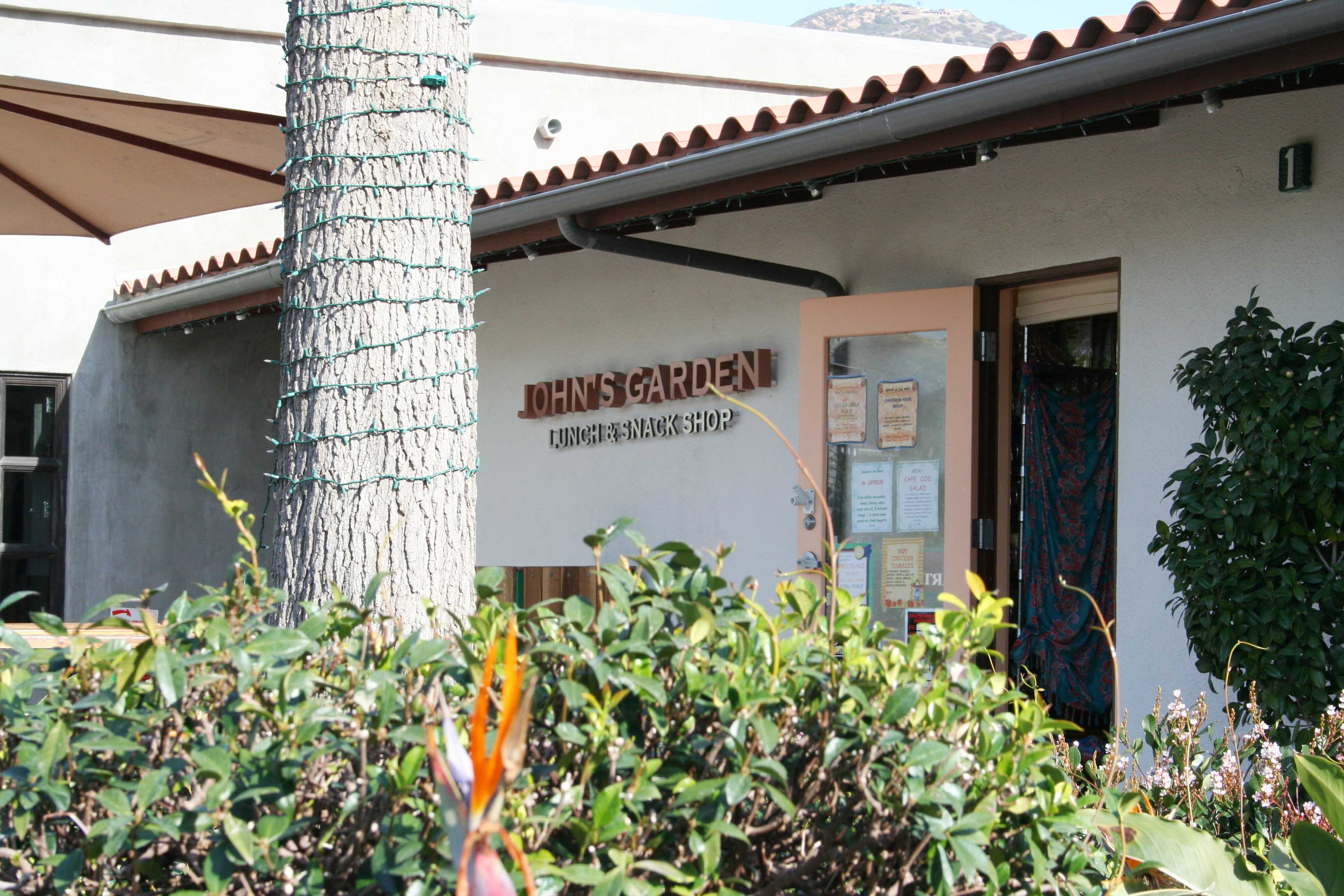
John's Garden

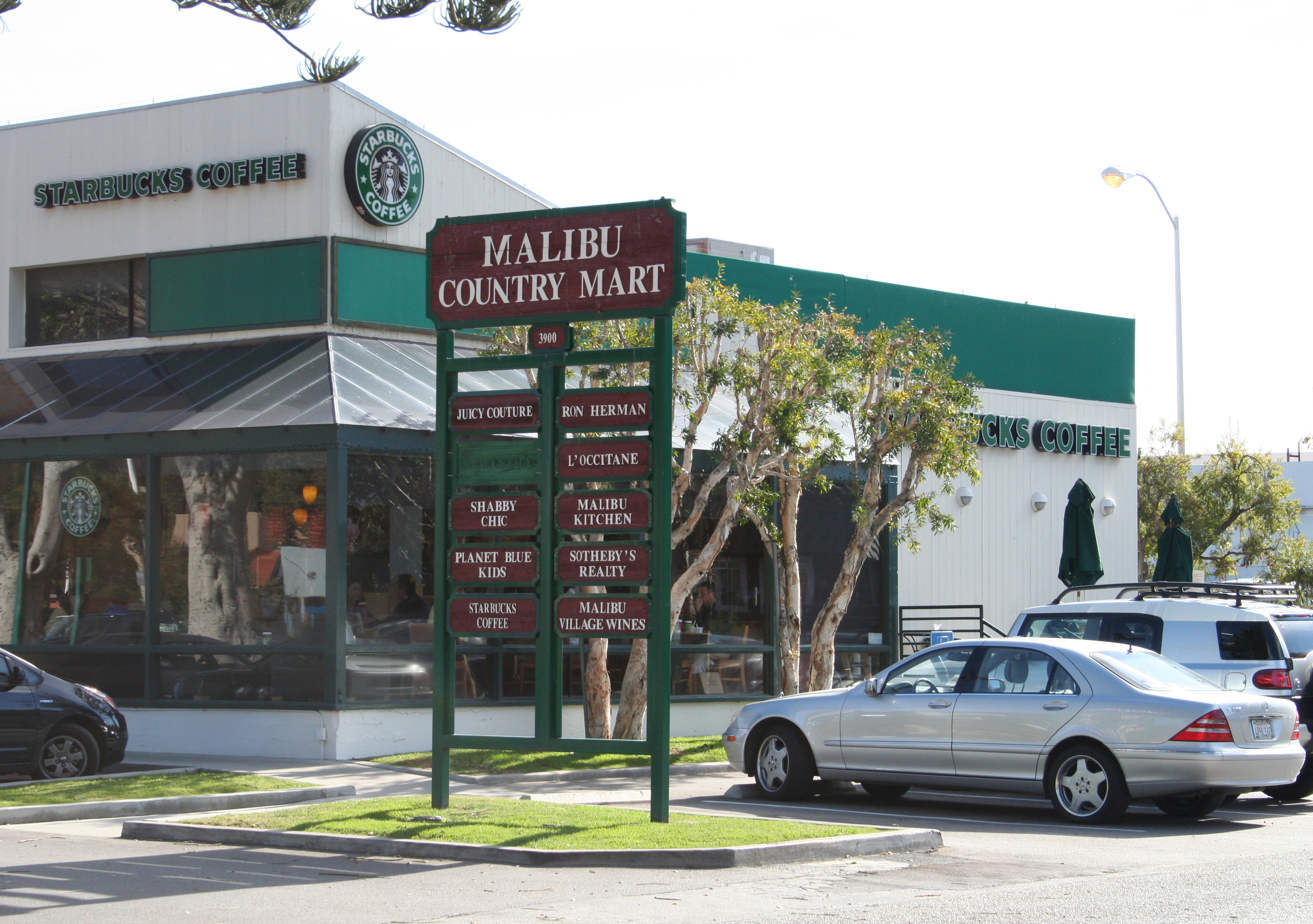
Starbucks

== See also ==
- Shopping Malls in the United States
