= Bellcamp Stores =

Bellcamp Stores operated a store chain which sold Kaufmann's hats in forty-one stores in sixteen states in the 1930s. Benjamin H. Kaufmann was president of the business.

Bellcamp filed for permission to reorganize under the Bankruptcy Act of 1898, on June 30, 1936. A casualty of the Great Depression, the corporation listed liabilities of $261,940 and assets of $333,030. The business was important because it sold merchandise in multiple regions of the United States. It was based at 123 West 42nd Street.

Bellcamp Stores emerged from bankruptcy and continued to do business in New York City. The company leased space in a building located at 13 - 25 Astor Place in January 1939. Prior to its bankruptcy reorganization the firm leased a store at 954 Flatbush Avenue to Griddle Eats, Inc. In July 1935 Bellcamp Stores leased to London Hats, Inc., building space at 600 West 181st Street.
