= Marmol Radziner =

Architecture firm based in Los Angeles

Practice information
- Partners: Leo Marmol; Ron Radziner
- Founded: 1989
- No. of employees: 160
- Location: Los Angeles, CA

Significant works and honors
- Projects: Restoration of the Kronish House; Restoration of the Garcia House
- Awards: American Institute of Architects National Honor Award, 2000; Firm of the Year, American Institute of Architects, California Council, 2004

Marmol Radziner is a design-build practice based in Los Angeles that was founded in 1989 by American architects Leo Marmol and Ron Radziner. The firm specializes in residential, commercial, hospitality, cultural, and community projects, and offers various design services, including architectural design, construction, landscape design, interior design, furniture design, jewelry design, and modern architecture restoration.

== Company ==
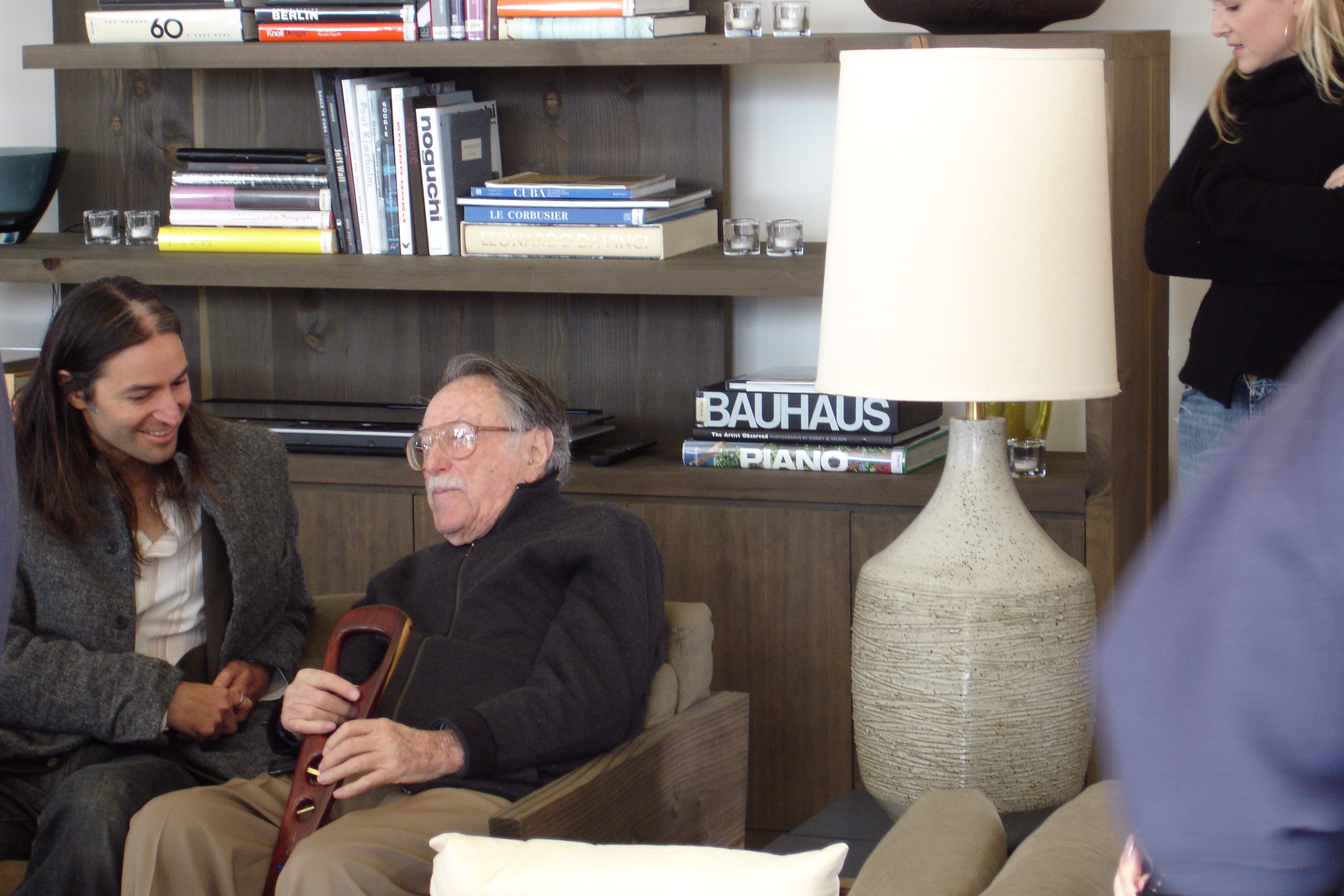
Ron Radziner speaking with architectural photographer Julius Shulman at Marmol Radziner's modernist Pre-Fabricated Desert House.

Architectural Digest has described the firm as following the "master builder" tradition by operating as "a single-source shop offering everything from architectural drawings and construction documents to prefab, custom cabinetry, fixtures, and furniture". The firm's employees "work across multidisciplinary teams of architects, landscape designers, interior designers, furniture designers, and construction crews". The firm frequently designs and fabricates original furnishings specific to each project through its in-house cabinet and metal shop in El Segundo. Founded in 1989, by 1999 Los Angeles Magazine noted in the annual "Best of Los Angeles" issue that the firm was "best known for their meticulous restoration of homes by Richard Neutra, Albert Frey, and other modernist architects".

In 2005 the firm launched Marmol Radziner Prefab to address sustainable construction. Its work received design honors for both architectural and industrial design, including an International Design Excellence Award (IDEA), sponsored by BusinessWeek. By 2015, the company had five prefab designs, "for about $200 per square foot". In 2007, it was critically lauded for the restoration of Richard Neutra's Kaufmann Desert House. In 2009, the firm debuted Marmol Radziner Jewelry, a handmade collection produced in the firm’s metal shop. Radziner's wife, Robin Cottle, who had received a Master of Fine Arts degree from the California Institute of the Arts, proposed to have that department make other pieces, which the company began selling commercially, with Cottle as the lead designer.

In 2012, The Hollywood Reporter named the firm one of the 25 "most influential interior designers in L.A.", describing them as "[m]asters of creating clean, modern environments coupled with a timeless aesthetic". In 2016, the same source listed them as one of the "10 hottest architects changing L.A. real estate". The firm opened a second office in the Mission District in San Francisco in 2014, and in 2019 an office in New York City, announcing as its first project there the interior design for a new residential tower in Brooklyn Heights.

An August 2019 piece in Architectural Digest stated that the firm, "fully embodies the concept of indoor-outdoor living". In November 2019, the American Institute of Architects awarded the firm the top spot in their annual Top 50 Firms in Business list, noting its substantial revenue increase over the previous year and its high per capita revenue relative to its number of employees.

== Selected work ==
=== Residential ===
==== Single-family ====
Co-founder Ron Radziner has described the process of designing a residence as being "like telling a story" of the family for whom the design is produced. The firm's design-build residential projects include Glencoe Residence (2002) in Venice, California; Ward Residence (2003) in Pacific Palisades; Altamira Residence (2006) in Palos Verdes; Trousdale Residence (2009) in Beverly Hills; Vienna Way Residence (2007) in Venice, California; Lilac Drive Residence (2011) in Montecito; Moreno Residence (2014) in Brentwood, Los Angeles; Mandeville Residence (2006) in Brentwood, Los Angeles; and Jackson House in Pacific Heights, San Francisco.

In 2007, the firm was called upon by Los Angeles interior designer and frequent collaborator Brad Dunning, to find a way to expand the 1950s house of Ashton Kutcher and Demi Moore, in a way that would preserve a mountain meadow overlook. The architects designed an addition "cantilevered from the front so it wouldn't block the prized views of oaks and sycamores". In 2009, cinematographer Robert Richardson employed the firm to renovate his L.A. West Side house, set in a wooded valley and originally designed by Cliff May in 1952. Marmol Radziner was selected for their "wide experience restoring midcentury jewels", and the rebuild aimed to "soften the house" in order to complement its natural surroundings, and to "avoid distracting from the drama" of nature "by focusing attention on the house's strengths".

Fashion designer Tom Ford brought in the firm to remodel the Holmby Hills estate of Betsy Bloomingdale. They also implemented the design of architect Tadao Ando for the buildings on Ford's ranch, a 20,662-acre Cerro Pelon Ranch estate in the Galisteo Basin of New Mexico, for which the firm was "responsible for the entire property's construction" including several houses and a ranch manager's headquarters with a detached office building and additional horse facilities. In 2000, Ford purchased the Brown-Sidney House in Los Angeles, also designed by Richard Neutra, and "enlisted Ron Radziner of Marmol-Radziner to helm the renovation", with assistance from Brad Dunning.

On Ford's recommendation, photographer Steven Meisel hired the firm to renovate a 1963 Hawaiian modern house in the Trousdale Estates neighborhood of Beverly Hills, California, originally designed by George MacLean. They increased the size of the home by more than a third, "extending the structure to the east and west so that it zigzags along the top of the ridge in the same rhythm as the existing house". Another fashion industry client, Cameron Silver, had the firm restore his hillside tri-level mid-century modern Los Angeles home, The Elliot House, which had originally been designed by Rudolf M. Schindler in 1930.

Ellen DeGeneres had the firm renovate her house, writing about the experience in her 2015 book, Home, describing how the house "uses only a handful of materials" to make everything feel connected, providing "a natural feel and continuous flow". At the 2016 American Institute of Architects convention in Philadelphia, keynote speaker Julia Louis-Dreyfus "offer[ed] insights into her experiences working to design a sustainable home in Los Angeles with architect Marmol Radziner, waxing on the details that keep her up at night".

Other clients have included Flea and Anthony Kiedis, Cameron Silver, and Bradley Cooper.

==== Multi-family ====
Marmol Radziner provided interior design services for multiple luxury residential properties owned by The Related Companies, including The Century in Century City; the Waverly in Santa Monica; the Emerson in Downtown Los Angeles; The Paramount in San Francisco; and Argyle House in Hollywood. The firm also designed special needs housing for Santos Plaza, Los Angeles.

As of June 2017, the firm was designing a tower for real estate company Brookfield central to the modernization of the California Market Center in the Fashion District of downtown Los Angeles. It also designed the Quay Tower in Brooklyn Bridge Park (New York City) and the Harland building in West Hollywood.

=== Commercial ===
==== Retail ====
Marmol Radziner’s retail projects include boutiques for Costume National in Los Angeles; Maxfield in Malibu; and Chan Luu in Los Angeles; and the Santa Monica flagship store and Hollywood store for art and design bookstore Hennessey + Ingalls. Marmol Radziner designed the first retail store location for contemporary clothing line VINCE., on Robertson Boulevard in Los Angeles, followed by Vince Mercer Street; Vince Prince Street; Vince Women Washington Street; Vince Greenwich in Greenwich, Connecticut; Vince Melrose; Vince Malibu Country Mart; and Vince San Francisco.

Oliver Peoples turned to the firm for the design of its location in San Francisco and a pop-up shop in East Hampton, New York. When Oliver Peoples opened its first London location, it "enlisted architects Marmol Radziner from its home city of Los Angeles to design the boutique, which features textured oak flooring and is furnished with teak and leather original pieces and authentic optometry stools". Oliver Peoples also had the firm redesign its East Hampton, New York store, "to reconstruct the organic-looking pop-up store for a more permanent look", for which the firm "merged the raw, rough-hewn quality of the pop-up with the warmth and leisure of a beach house gathering".

The firm also designed retail stores for James Perse in East Hampton, New York, and the Malibu Country Mart, as well as Elyse Walker in Newport Beach, California.

In November 2019, the firm made its first public presentation of interior renovation plans for the historic Cecil Hotel in Los Angeles, proposing to restore classical features dating from the hotel's 1924 reconstruction.

==== Workplace ====
The firm designed the offices for the ad agency TBWA\Chiat\Day in San Francisco.

==== Community ====
Los Angeles Magazine noted of Marmol Radziner that "some of the most creative work is pro bono—the Inner City Arts facility downtown, a South-Central school and a planned cultural center in Watts". Other community-based projects include a Pre-K-12 campus for The Accelerated School, Los Angeles, and a conference Center for TreePeople Center for Community Forestry.

== Notable restorations ==
The firm has restored projects by Richard Neutra; Roland Coate; Albert Frey; Buff, Straub, and Hensman; Erle Webster; John Chapman; Harwell Hamilton Harris; Rudolph Schindler; A. Quincy Jones; Thornton Ladd; W. McAllister; Robert Kennard; John Lautner; Cliff May; Raphael Soriano; and E. Stewart Williams. Marmol Radziner is currently serving as the preservation architect on the redevelopment of the Minoru Yamasaki-designed Hyatt Regency Century Plaza Hotel in Century City, Los Angeles, "focusing on the historic restoration components of the project".

== Honors and awards ==
The firm was named Firm of the Year by the American Institute of Architects (AIA), California Council in 2004. It was also awarded the AIA National Honor Award in 2000, recognizing their restoration of the Kaufmann Desert House in Palm Springs, California. In 2007, Leo Marmol and Ron Radziner were elevated to the College of the Fellows of the AIA. In 2009, Interior Design inducted them into the magazine’s Hall of Fame, and Architectural Digest named Marmol Radziner one of its AD100 in 2010, 2012, 2014, and 2016. The firm has won American Society of Landscape Architects Honor Awards in 2006 (for the Horizon Residence, Venice, California), 2008 (for the Altamira Ranch, Palos Verdes, California), 2009 (for the Vienna Way Residence, Venice, California), and 2016 (for the Kronish House, Beverly Hills, California). In November 2019, the firm was awarded the top spot in the annual Top 50 Firms in Business list assembled by the AIA.

== Marmol Radziner furniture ==
Marmol Radziner designs and produces furniture collections available for custom order, and for other designers.
