= Paul Mayén =

Spanish architect and industrial designer

- Born: May 31, 1916; La Línea de la Concepción, Cádiz, Spain
- Died: November 3, 2000 (aged 84); Westchester County, New York, U.S.
- Education: Cooper Union; Columbia University
- Occupations: Architect, industrial designer
- Partner: Edgar Kaufmann Jr.

Paul Mayén (May 31, 1916 – November 3, 2000) was a Spanish architect and industrial designer known for his work at Frank Lloyd Wright's Fallingwater.

== Early years ==
Mayén was born on May 31, 1916, in La Línea de la Concepción, a town in Cádiz in Andalucia, Spain. He graduated from Cooper Union in New York City with a Bachelor of Fine Arts and from Columbia University with a master's degree during World War II.

== Career ==
Mayén was an industrial designer, and following his graduation from Columbia, taught classes in advertising design at his alma mater, Cooper Union, and The New School, both in Manhattan.

His lamps, tables, and other furniture are featured in the permanent collection of the Museum of Modern Art in New York City, and was the founder of Habitat, Intrex and Architectural Supplements, Inc.

=== Fallingwater ===
Mayén's partner, Edgar Kaufmann Jr., inherited the 1936 Frank Lloyd Wright designed Fallingwater house, over Bear Run, in Stewart Township, Pennsylvania, after his father's death in 1955, continuing to use and share it as a mountain retreat until 1963. Kaufmann entrusted the Wright structures and several hundred acres of the surrounding pristine Laurel Highlands lands in the Allegheny Mountains to the Western Pennsylvania Conservancy as an architectural house museum and conservation open space preserve, in memory of his parents.

From 1979 to 1981, Mayén oversaw the building of the Fallingwater pavilion, which houses the café, gift store, and visitor center at Fallingwater.

== Personal life ==
In the 1950s Mayén met fellow art student Edgar Kaufmann Jr. with whom he would have a relationship and work partnership that would last until Kaufmann's death in 1989. In 1975, Mayén built a country house for himself and Kaufmann in Garrison, New York, on the east side of the Hudson River. Known as Water Run, this property was sold in 2021 for $1.6M. Kaufmann died in 1989, and his ashes were scattered around the property at Fallingwater by Mayén.

Mayén died on November 3, 2000. His ashes were also scattered at Fallingwater in accordance with his wishes.

== See also ==
- Fallingwater
