= Kaufmann's =

Department store that originated in Pittsburgh, Pennsylvania

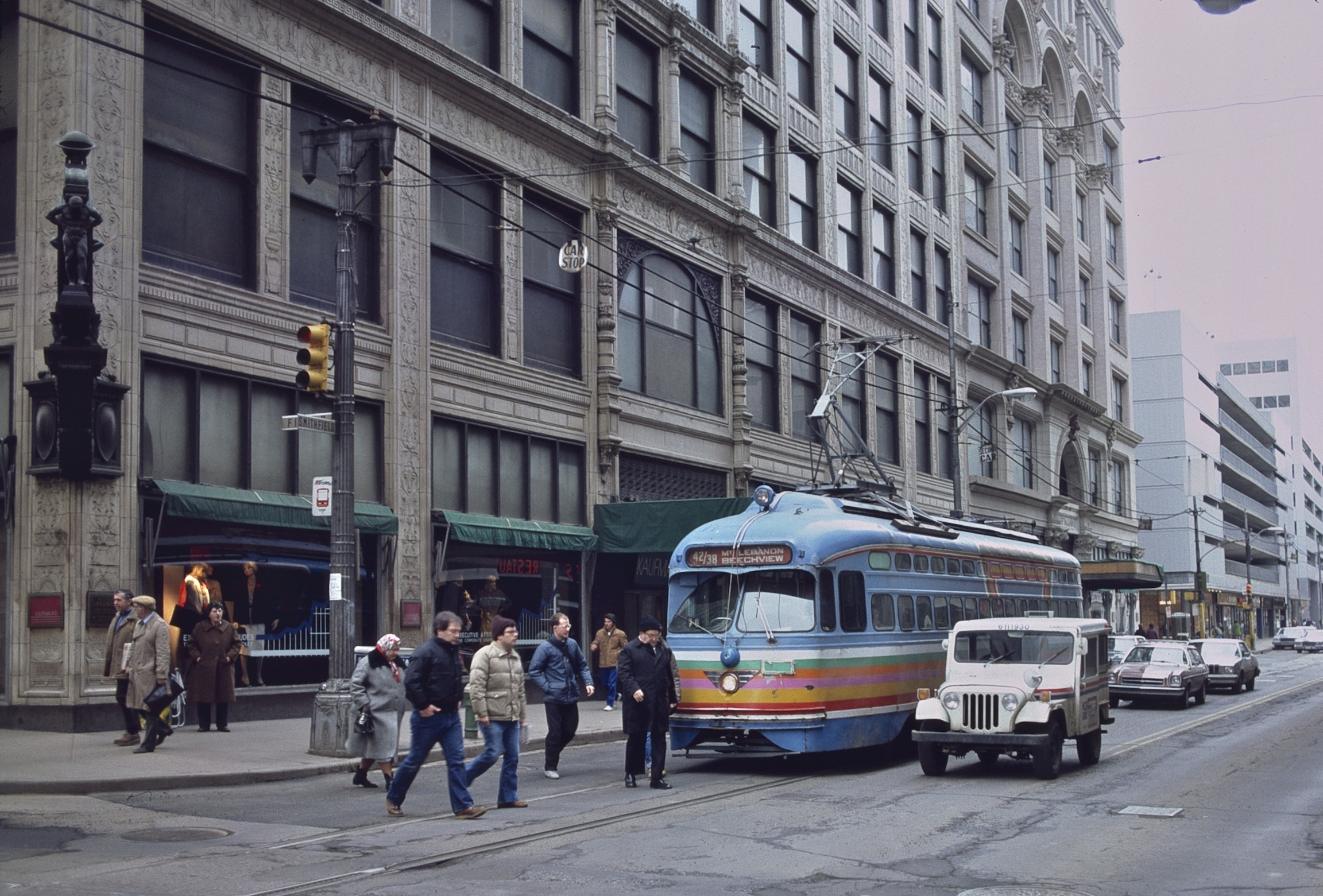
- Kaufmann's flagship store in downtown Pittsburgh in 1984, with a trolley car stopping in front
- Industry: Retail
- Founded: 1871; 155 years ago
- Defunct: September 9, 2006; 20 years ago
- Fate: Acquired by Macy's
- Successor: Macy's
- Headquarters: Pittsburgh, Pennsylvania, U.S.
- Key people: Jacob Kaufmann, Isaac Kaufmann, and Edgar J. Kaufmann
- Products: Clothing, footwear, bedding, furniture, jewelry, beauty products, housewares, and auto centers
- Parent: Federated Department Stores (2005–2006); The May Department Stores Company (1946–2005)
- Website: Archived official website at the Wayback Machine (archive index)

Kaufmann's Department Store Final Logo

Kaufmann's was a department store chain in the United States that originated in Pittsburgh, Pennsylvania. The first store was owned in the early 20th century by Edgar J. Kaufmann, patron of the famous Fallingwater house. In the post-war years, Kaufmann's became a regional chain in the eastern United States, and was last owned by Federated Department Stores. At the height of its existence, it had some 59 stores in 5 states.

Formerly part of May Department Stores prior to that company's acquisition by Federated Department Stores on August 30, 2005, Kaufmann's operated as part of the Filene's organization in Boston, Massachusetts. On February 1, 2006, the Filene's/Kaufmann's organization was dissolved and the management of its stores was assumed by Macy's East and the new Macy's Midwest. Later that year, on September 9, 2006, Macy's retired the Kaufmann's name as Federated Department Stores converted the former May Company brands to its masthead.

In 2015, Macy's closed and sold the iconic downtown Pittsburgh store for redevelopment as part of the company's ongoing reorganization of its owned properties. Core Realty of Philadelphia, the new owners of the building, have named the proposed mixed-use property "Kaufmann's Grand on Fifth" in honor of the historic department store.

== History ==
Kaufmann's was founded in Pittsburgh in 1871 by brothers Morris, Jacob, and Isaac Kaufmann as a small South Side men's store. In 1877, the brothers moved downtown to a location that became known as The Big Store. In the first half of the 20th century, the store was owned by Edgar J. Kaufmann. For a time, Kaufmann's was the most prominent of seven department stores in downtown Pittsburgh which included Kaufmann & Baer, founded by cousins of the original Kaufmann's founders and which later became Gimbels in 1925; Joseph Horne Co.; Boggs & Buhl; Frank & Seder's, Rosenbaum's, and Boggs & Buhl of Allegheny Center. In 1913, Morris Kaufmann and his son Edgar bought out the other family members and incorporated the Kaufmann's department store.

Isaac, Ludwig and Nathan Kaufmann partnered with Morris and Julius Baer to start a new department store, Kaufmann & Baer Co., which ultimately became Gimbels. They built the 13 story, 700,000 square foot building at the corner of Sixth and Smithfield in downtown Pittsburgh. The store opened on March 18, 1914, advertising that there was "no connection with any other store". On December 2, 1925, the Gimbel Brothers purchased Kaufmann & Baer Co., with the store name updated to Gimbels on January 3, 1928. Batus Inc., a tobacco conglomerate, purchased the entire Gimbels chain in 1974. In 1986, after years of declining sales, Batus announced that Gimbels was for sale. Unable to find a buyer for the entire chain, Batus closed the unprofitable Gimbels-Pittsburgh division, closing all of its locations and selling the properties, except for some of the high profit Gimbels locations in shopping malls rebranded as Kaufmann's stores.

With Edgar J. Kaufmann remaining as president, the Kaufmann's chain was acquired by the St. Louis Missouri based May Department Stores in 1946. The Kaufmann's division operated stores in Pennsylvania, New York, Ohio and West Virginia. The Kaufmann's chain dominated its local region, absorbing several other department stores including Strouss (1986) based in Youngstown, Ohio; Sibley's (1990) based in Rochester, New York; May Company Ohio (1992) based in Cleveland, Ohio (which had merged with O'Neil's (1989) in Akron, Ohio); and in 1994 the remnants of McCurdy's stores of Rochester and Hess's of Allentown, Pennsylvania.

In 2002, the Kaufmann's stores' Pittsburgh business headquarters closed, and its back-office operations were consolidated into those of Filene's Department Stores in Boston. In 2005, Federated Department Stores Inc., agreed to buy May Department Stores Co. for $11 billion (equivalent to $17.4 billion in 2025).

== Kaufmann's Flagship Store ==
Designed by architect Charles Bickel, the Kaufmann's flagship store was built in 1887 at 400 Fifth Avenue in downtown Pittsburgh. Known as The Big Store, it continued to undergo several expansions and renovations in later years. By 1916, the architects Janssen & Abbott designed a larger white terra cotta-sheathed addition that included a large public clock at the corner. In the late 1920s, Edgar G. Kaufmann commissioned a redesign of the main floor of the department store. Local architect Benno Janssen and his partner William Cocken rose to the challenge to complete the project. At one point, the building was the largest department store in Pittsburgh with twelve retail floors, and spanning an entire downtown city block. It eventually reached 13 floors and covered 1.2 million square feet. Kaufman commissioned Frank Lloyd Wright to design his executive offices on the top floor of The Big Store, as well as his country house 'Fallingwater' (1934) at the company's Bear Run retreat in Pennsylvania. The office interior was saved and reinstalled in the Victoria and Albert Museum in London. He also commissioned architect Richard Neutra to design the desert Kaufmann House (1946) in Palm Springs, California.

=== "Meet me under Kaufmann's clock" ===
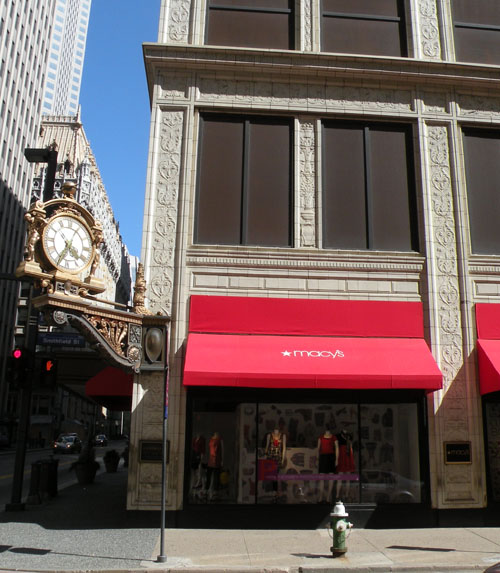
Kaufmann's Clock at the flagship store

Kaufmann's flagship Big Store had a landmark outdoor clock at Fifth Avenue and Smithfield Street that existed since the building was first constructed. The original clock was installed in 1887 and was free-standing with four dials. With the expansion of the store in 1913, the current clock was installed. The clock is a Pittsburgh icon, and is often featured in visual materials representing and marketing the city. It immediately became a popular downtown meeting place, with the oft-used phrase "Meet me under Kaufmann's clock." In 1983, the clock was the site of a political media spectacle between City Councilman "Jeep" DePasquale and Councilwoman Michelle Madoff, wherein Madoff challenged DePasquale to meet her under the clock and make good on a promise after a tax she proposed raised funds he didn't believe possible. Both the Kaufmann's flagship building and the clock are designated as Pittsburgh Historical Landmarks.

In 2013, for the Clock's 100th anniversary, Macy's sold merchandise and redecorated the store's windows along Smithfield Street with photos of the iconic clock from over the years, including one that featured the results of a contest held by the Pittsburgh Post-Gazette in which readers submitted their best memories of "Meeting Under Kaufmann's Clock". Macy's also held a weekend of festivities including a block party on Smithfield Street in front of the store.

==== Rebrand to Macy's ====
Following the purchase by Macy's in 2006, USA Today ran an article about the regional chains merging into Macy's which featured memories from Pittsburgh residents about the store and the clock: "As girls in their best dresses and Mary Jane shoes, they rode streetcars downtown to the 11-story Kaufmann's department store here. Jean Wenner, 81, and her friends grew up on Kaufmann's, meeting under the store's ornate clock, lunching at the Tic Toc restaurant and bringing their own children to the Secret Santa."

=== Kaufmann's Parade ===
Kaufmann's was the main sponsor of the Celebrate the Season Parade, which ran through downtown Pittsburgh, at its inception in 1980. The parade was held the Saturday after Thanksgiving for 32 years, with Macy's taking over the sponsorship after purchasing May/Kaufmann's in 2006. The parade included balloons, musical acts, and celebrities for the main acts in front of the Kaufmann's Fifth Avenue flagship store. In February 2014, Macy's announced it would end its partnership with WPXI as main sponsors of the parade. Pittsburgh Public Schools sponsored the parade with WPXI from 2014- 2016.

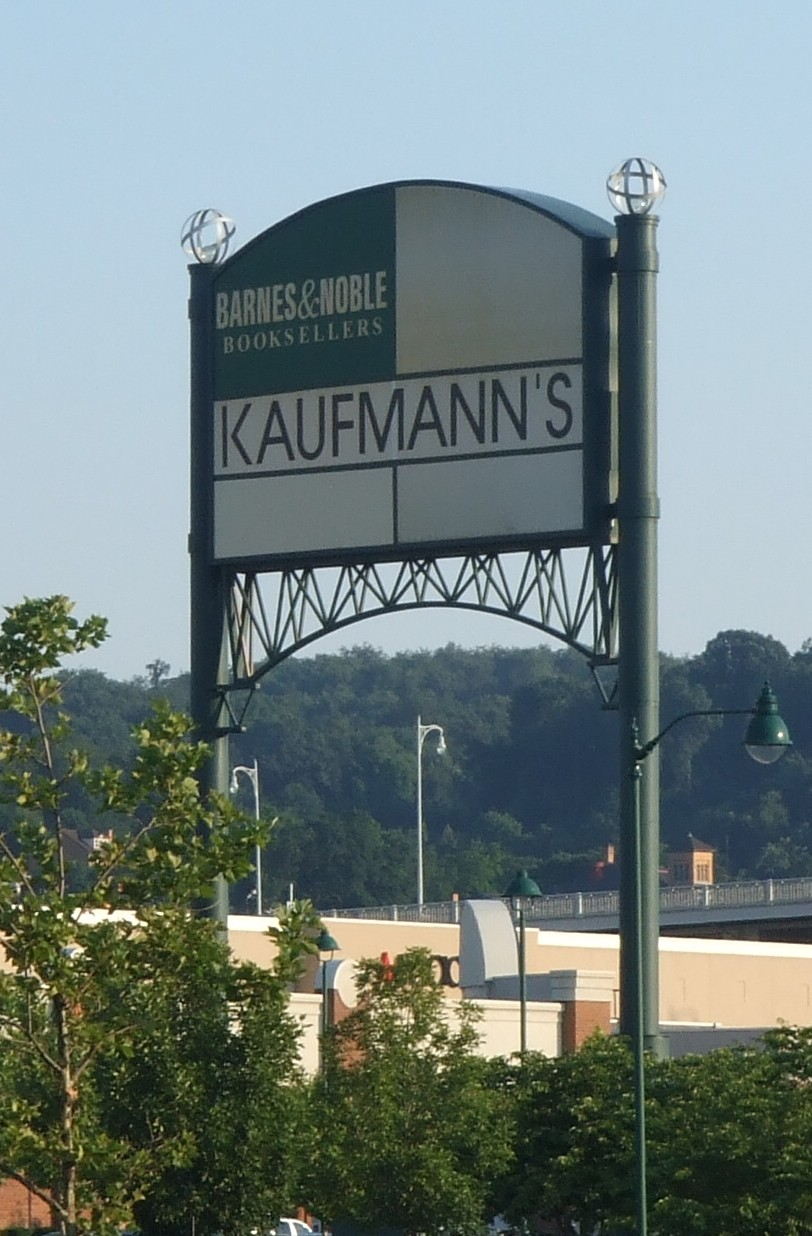
Though converted a year prior to this image's creation, this Macy's store located at The Waterfront still had Kaufmann's signage. The current Macy's sign can be seen slightly behind the trees. Macy's later put a sign over this, but Kaufmann's is still readable beneath. This Macy's closed in 2018.

=== Acquisitions and closure ===
The Kaufmann's flagship store was rebranded as Macy's after the company acquired Kaufmann's parent company in 2005. Several Kaufmann's holiday traditions continued to prevail after the company was taken over by Macy's, including animated Christmas windows and Santa Land. As of 2006, several Kaufmann's plaques were still visible on the building.

On July 13, 2015, Macy's announced it sold the downtown property to Core Realty, ending the building's use as a department store after 128 years on September 20, 2015, with plans to redevelop the building for mixed use. The new development, which includes apartments, restaurants and a hotel, was slated to open in late 2017, but was delayed because the building was without a permanent power source. As of August 2018, restaurant, hotel and apartment owners were expecting to be able to allow occupants by the end of the year. By April 2020 the Project was still unfinished and to be sold to another development company. In 2020, Target Corporation announced they will open a 22,000 SF location on the first floor of the former Kaufmann's space by Christmas, 2021. Burlington Coat Factory took over as the 2nd floor tenant in September 2023. In total, the upper floors have been redeveloped into 311 apartments as well as a 410-space parking garage.

== See also ==
- Bellcamp Stores
- List of department stores converted to Macy's
- List of defunct department stores of the United States
