= Edgar J. Kaufmann =

American businessman (1885–1955)

Edgar Kaufmann
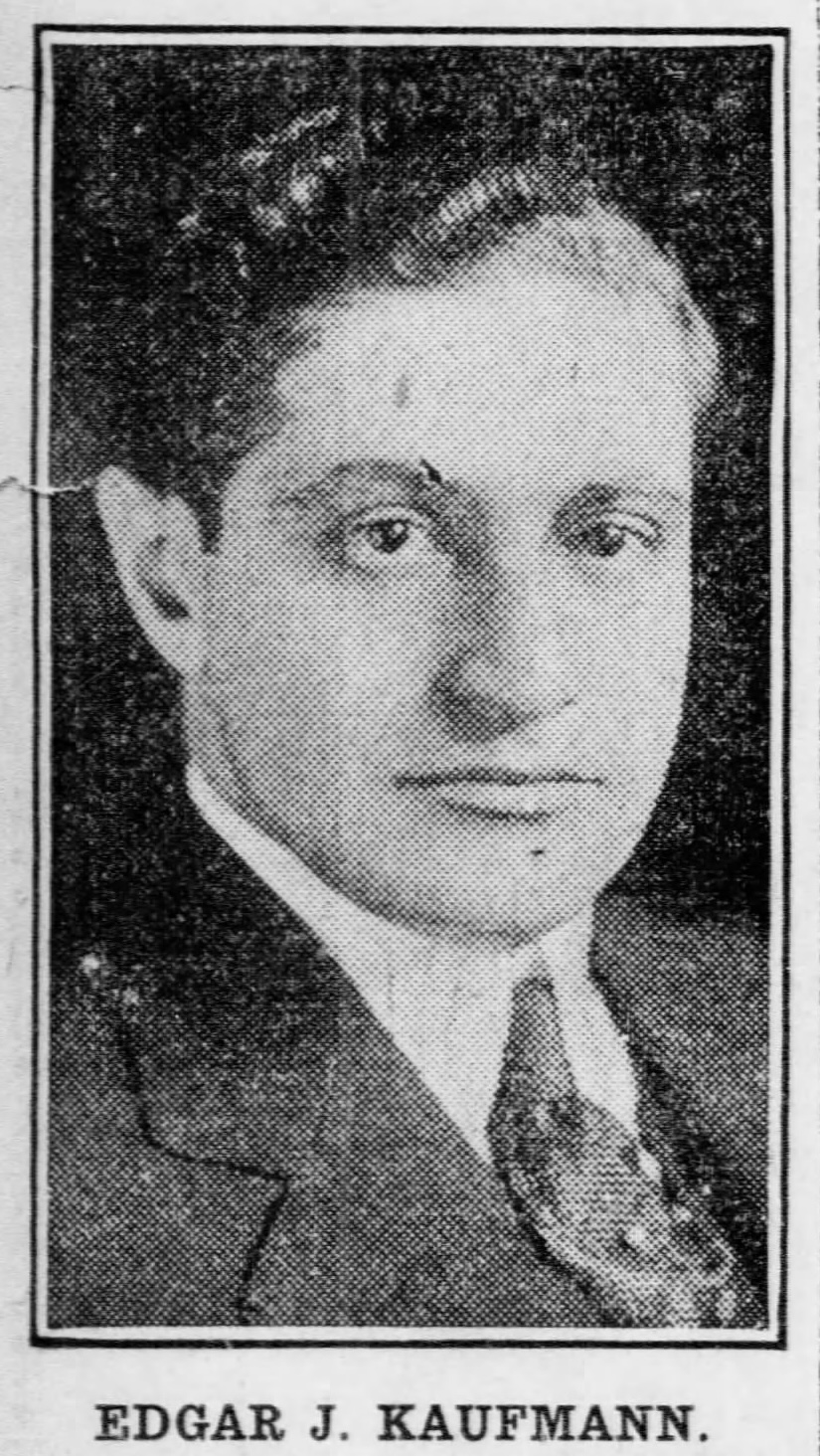
- Pittsburgh Post, 1916
- Born: Edgar Jonas Kaufmann; November 1, 1885; Pittsburgh, Pennsylvania
- Died: April 15, 1955 (aged 69); Palm Springs, California
- Education: Shady Side Academy
- Alma mater: Yale University
- Occupation: Businessman
- Known for: Owner of Kaufmann's and commissioner of Fallingwater
- Spouses: Lillian Sarah Kaufmann (m. 1909; died 1952) Grace Stoops (m. 1954)
- Children: Edgar Kaufmann, Jr.

Edgar Jonas Kaufmann (November 1, 1885 – April 15, 1955) was an American businessman and philanthropist who owned and directed Kaufmann's Department Store, in Pittsburgh. He is also known for commissioning two modern architectural masterpieces, Fallingwater, designed by Frank Lloyd Wright, and the Kaufmann Desert House in Palm Springs, designed by Richard Neutra.

== Early life ==
Edgar Kaufmann was born to a Jewish family on November 1, 1885, the eldest son of Morris Kaufmann, who was born in Viernheim, Germany. His uncles, Jacob and Isaac Kaufmann, founded Kaufmann's department store in 1871.

Kaufmann graduated from Shady Side Academy, a boarding school in Pittsburgh, Pennsylvania, and Yale University in New Haven, Connecticut.

== Commissions ==
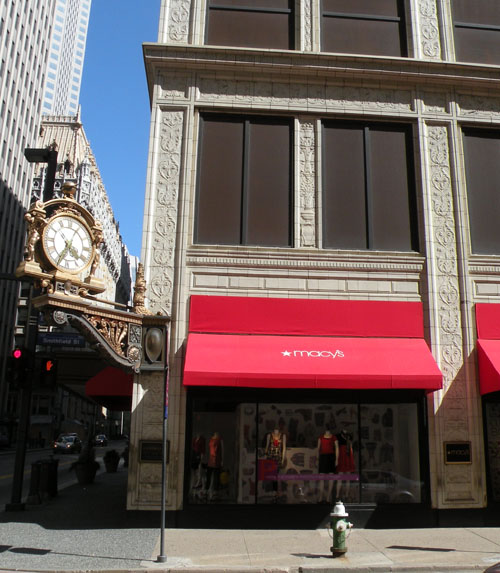
Kaufmann's department store in downtown Pittsburgh, designed by Charles Bickel in 1898, with an addition done by Janssen & Abbott in 1913

In 1926, Kaufmann commissioned American artist Boardman Robinson to create a series of nine murals for his flagship department store in Pittsburgh on the history of trade. In 1929, Kaufmann started to modernize the interiors of the Pittsburgh department store. For the interior design of the ground floor he commissioned Benno Janssen who created an American version of French Art Deco style. In 1935 the architect Frank Lloyd Wright designed the executive offices on the top floor. The carpet and textiles for the office were designed by Loja Saarinen. The Kaufmann Office is now installed at the Victoria and Albert Museum in London, England.

Architect Benno Janssen designed several structures for Kaufmann including his private residence (1924–1925) known as La Tourelle in Fox Chapel, Pennsylvania. The Pittsburgh Chamber of Commerce in 1930 awarded an "Excellence in Design" for the facades. For the city of Pittsburgh, Edgar Kaufmann generously financed the Pittsburgh Civic Light Opera Company, and donated US$1.5 million for the erection of the Civic Arena. Edgar Kaufmann was one of the city's leading citizens who welcomed Albert Einstein when he visited Pittsburgh in 1934. Improving the infrastructure of the city was one of his concerns, another was art patronage.

== Landmark residences ==
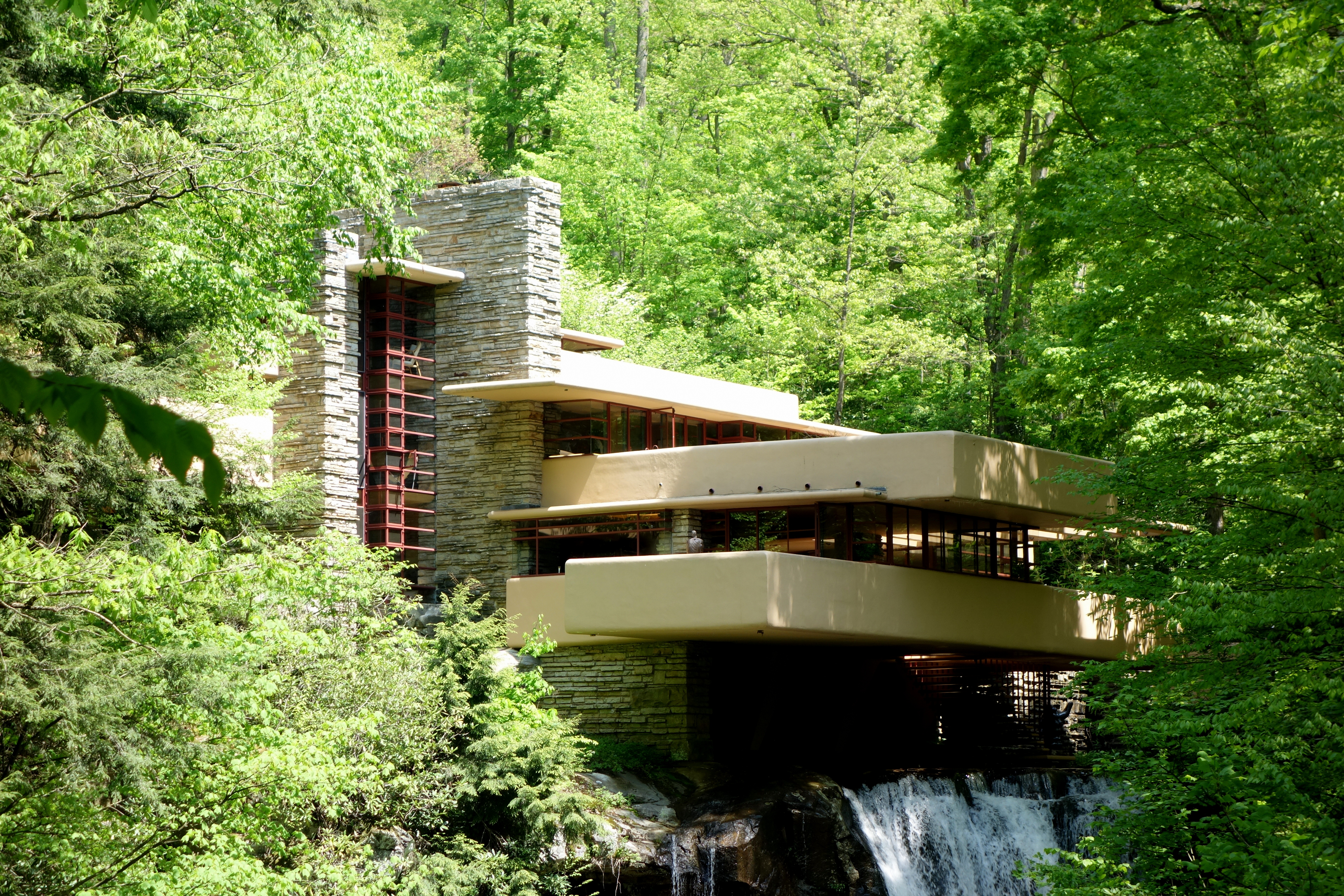
Fallingwater, 2013

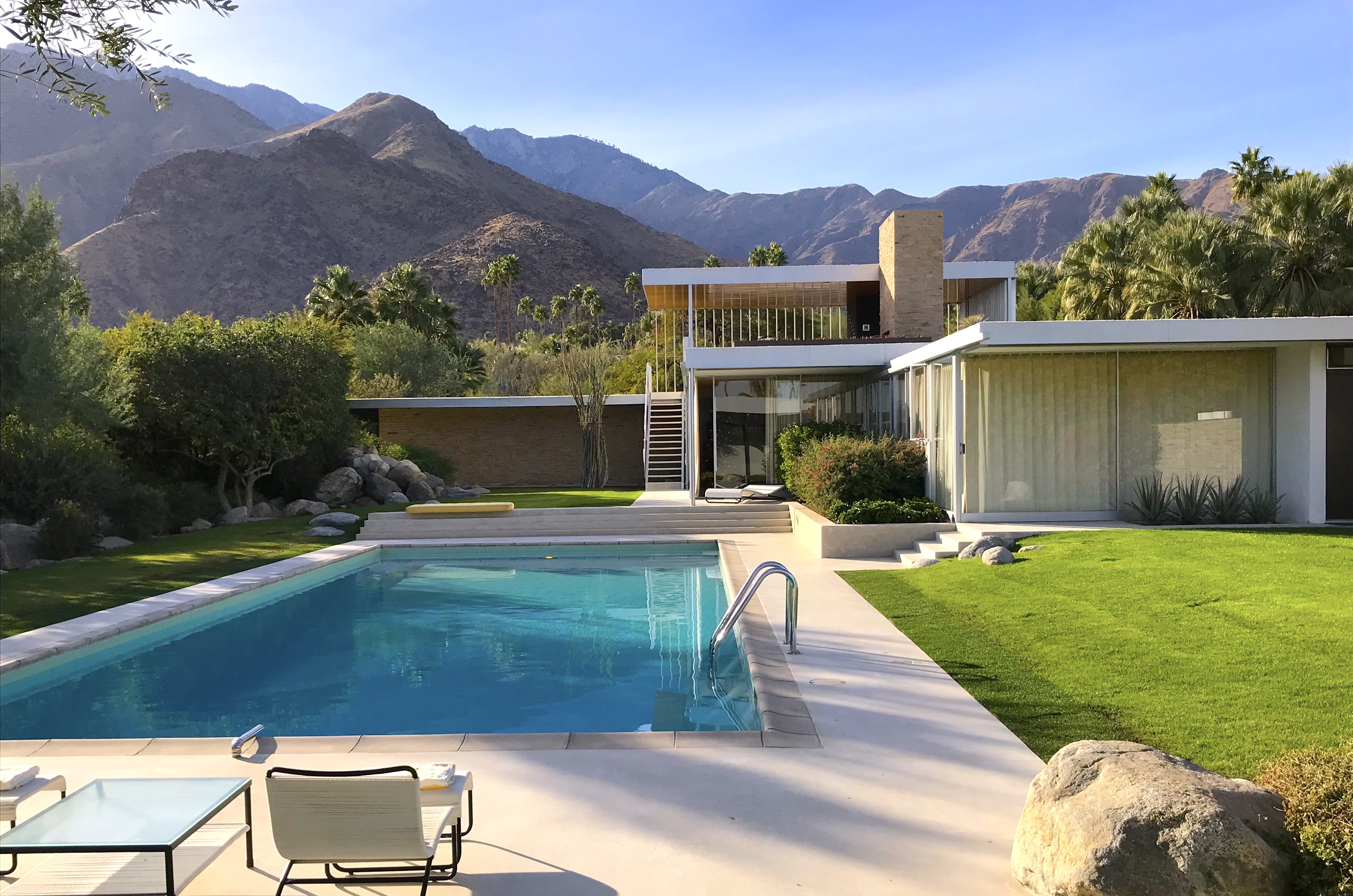
Kaufmann Desert House, 2017

Edgar J. Kaufmann and his wife, Lilian, commissioned two of the most recognized landmarks of 20th-century American modernism architecture: Pennsylvania's Fallingwater and California's Kaufmann Desert House.

Fallingwater is a National Historic Landmark and on the National Register of Historic Places. Designed by renowned architect Frank Lloyd Wright in 1935, it is a distinctive country house over the Bear Run waterfalls at the family's Laurel Highlands property southeast of Pittsburgh. A unique designer/patron relationship evolved between Wright and Kaufmann during the complex design-construction process. The success of the house resurrected Wright's career after the Great Depression.

The Kaufmann Desert House in Palm Springs, California, was designed by architect Richard Neutra and completed in 1946. The photographer Julius Shulman created an iconic photograph of it in 1947. In the 1990s, the residence was extensively restored to the Kaufmanns' era by architects Marmol Radziner + Associates, and is a City of Palm Springs Class One Historic Landmark, although its application for inclusion on the National Register of Historic Places was denied.

== Personal life ==
In 1909, he married Lillian Sarah Kaufmann (d. 1952) in New York City: they could not marry in Pennsylvania as they were first cousins. Lillian was the daughter of Edgar's uncle, Isaac Kaufmann. They had one child, Edgar Jonas Kaufmann, Jr. (1910–1989).

In 1954, after the death of his first wife by an overdose of Seconal, he married his secretary and long-time mistress, Grace A. Stoops.

Edgar J. Kaufmann died of bone cancer in 1955 in Palm Springs, California, after seven months of marriage to Stoops. With his first wife, he is entombed in the family mausoleum at Fallingwater. His son's ashes were spread on the property. The majority of his and his wife's estate was left to the Edgar J. Kaufmann Charitable Fund, which concentrates efforts on improving the lives of Pittsburgh's residents. His son Edgar Kaufmann, Jr. inherited Fallingwater, and in 1963 donated it, along with the pristine natural mountain acreage, to the Western Pennsylvania Conservancy. Both are open to the public: the house for tours, and the preserve for walks and hiking.

The office of Edgar J. Kaufmann from the Kaufmann store in Pittsburgh was given by his son Edgar Jr. to the Victoria and Albert Museum in London in 1974.
