= Kaufmann Desert House =

House in Palm Springs, California

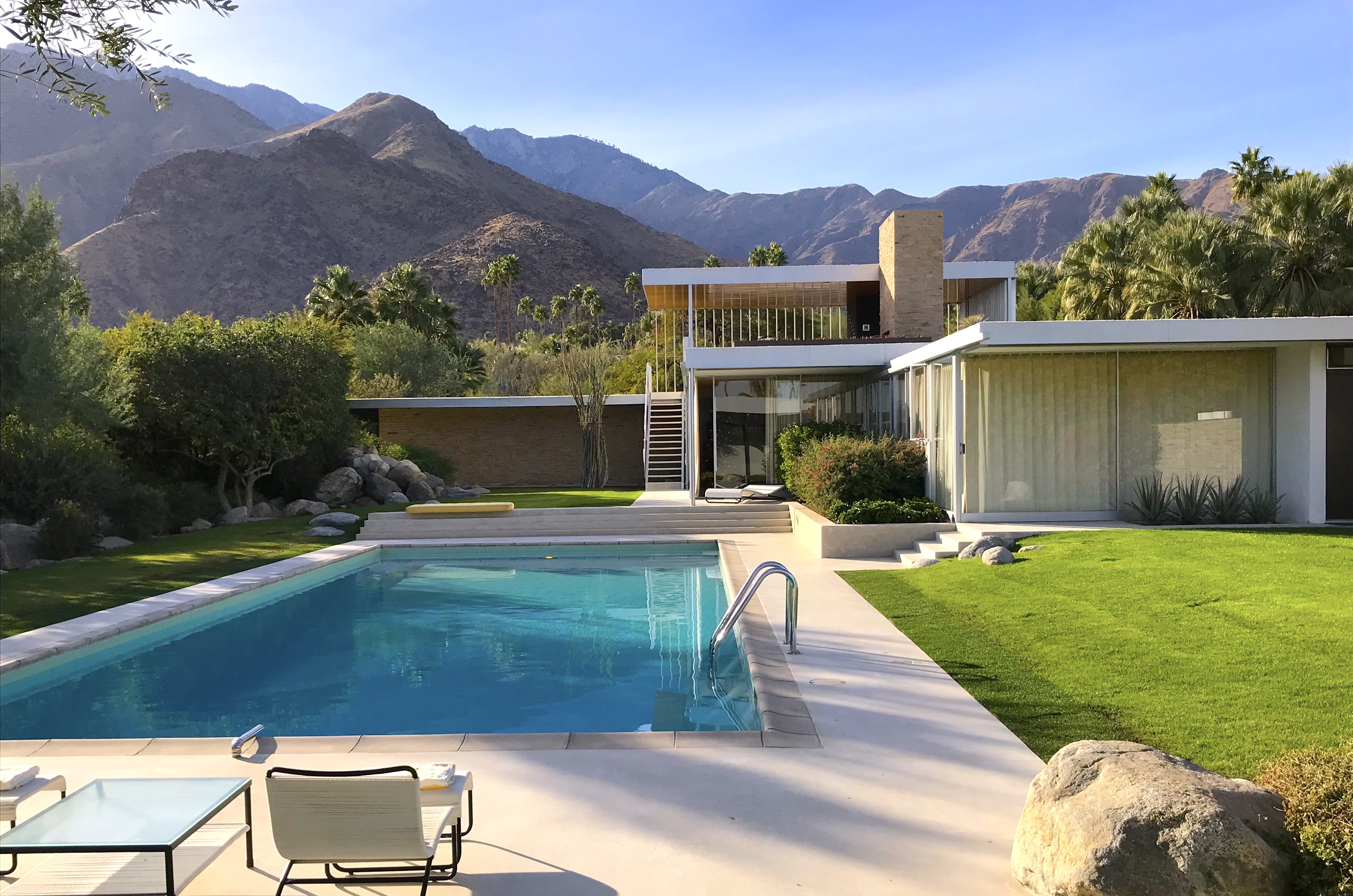
- Kaufmann Desert House, December 2017
- Interactive map of the Kaufmann Desert House area

General information
- Status: Completed
- Architectural style: International Style
- Location: 470 West Vista Chino; Palm Springs, California; United States
- Coordinates: 33.8451°N 116.5529°W
- Completed: 1946

Design and construction
- Architect: Richard J. Neutra

The Kaufmann Desert House, or simply the Kaufmann House, is a house in Palm Springs, California, that was designed by architect Richard Neutra in 1946. It was commissioned by Edgar J. Kaufmann, Sr., a businessman who also commissioned Fallingwater by Frank Lloyd Wright.

The house has been described as "an architectural marvel that helped define the modernist aesthetic of the resort city of Palm Springs".

It is designated a Class 1 Historic Site by Palm Springs City Council.

== History ==
The house was commissioned by Edgar J. Kaufmann, Sr., the owner of Kaufmann's Department Store in Pittsburgh, as a desert retreat from harsh winters. It was made famous by photographs taken by Julius Shulman in 1947 and the 1970 photograph "Poolside Gossip" by Slim Aarons. In 1935, Kaufmann had commissioned Frank Lloyd Wright to design Fallingwater in Pennsylvania.

After Kaufmann died in 1955, the house stood vacant for several years. It then had a series of owners, including singer Barry Manilow and San Diego Chargers owner Eugene V. Klein, and had several renovations. These renovations enclosed a patio, added floral wallpaper to the bedrooms and removed a wall for the addition of a media room. The roof lines were also altered with the addition of air-conditioning units. After being listed for sale for 3½ years, the home was purchased in 1992 by Brent Harris, an investment manager, and his wife Beth Edwards Harris, an architectural historian, for $1.5 million.

Seeking to restore the home to its original design, the Harrises contacted Marmol Radziner + Associates to undertake the five-year project, which began in 1993. For references, the Harrises looked through the extensive Neutra archives at UCLA, found additional documents through Columbia University, and were able to work with Shulman to access some of his unpublished photos of the home's interior. They were able to obtain pieces from the original suppliers of paint and fixtures, and purchased a metal-crimping machine to reproduce the sheet-metal fascia that originally lined the roof.

The Harrises were also able to have a long-closed section of a Utah quarry reopened to mine matching stone to replace what had been removed or damaged. To help restore the desert buffer Neutra had envisioned for the house, the Harrises also bought several adjoining plots to more than double the land around the 3,200-square-foot (300 m^{2}) house. They rebuilt a pool house that served as a viewing pavilion for the main house, and kept a tennis court that was built on a parcel added to the original Kaufmann property.

After the Harrises divorced, the home was sold on May 13, 2008, for US$15 million at auction by Christie's as a part of a high-profile sale of contemporary art. It had a presale estimate of US$15 million to US$25 million. The sale later fell through, as the bidder breached terms of the purchase agreement.

In October 2008, the house was listed for sale at US$12.95 million, but it was not sold. It was again listed for sale in October 2020 at US$25 million. The house eventually sold for US$13 million in 2022, a record for the Palm Springs market.

The Kaufmann house was included in a list of all-time top 10 houses in Los Angeles, despite its location in Palm Springs, in a Los Angeles Times survey of experts in December 2008.

The house was a filming location for the 2022 film Don't Worry Darling.
