= Ron Radziner =

American architect

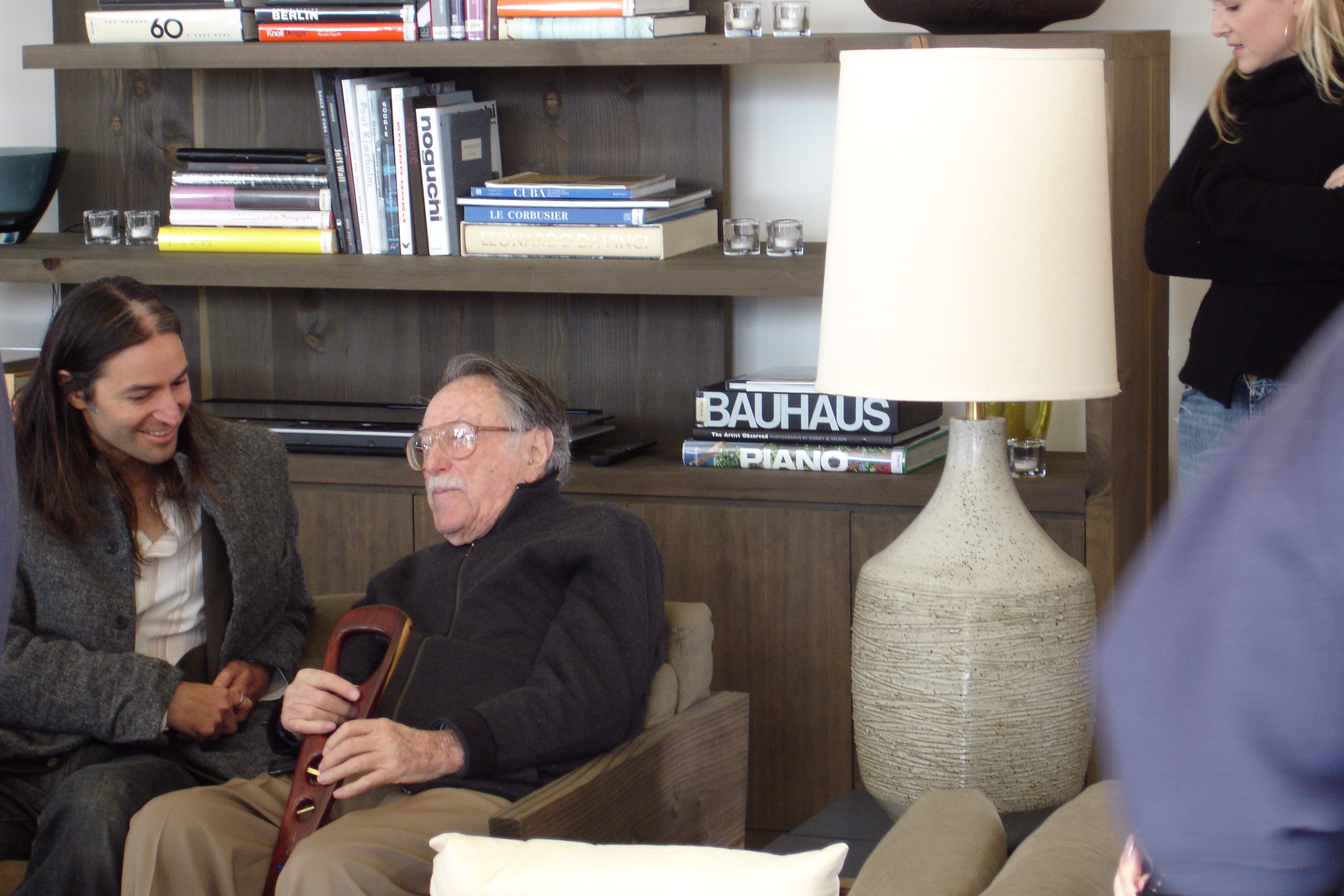
- Ron Radziner (left) speaking with architectural photographer Julius Shulman at Marmol Radziner's modernist Pre-Fabricated Desert House.
- Education: B.S. in Architecture; M.Arch
- Alma mater: Cal Poly; University of Colorado
- Occupation(s): Architect, interior designer
- Known for: Co-founder of Marmol Radziner
- Website: www.marmol-radziner.com

Ron Radziner is an American architect who is the co-founder and design partner of the design-build practice, Marmol Radziner.

== Early life and education ==
Radziner grew up in the Los Angeles area. His parents were survivors of the Dutch Holocaust who immigrated to Los Angeles in the 1950s.

Radziner graduated from Reseda High School before going on to attend California Polytechnic State University (Cal Poly). While studying architecture at Cal Poly, he met and became friends with Leo Marmol, with whom he would later found Marmol Radziner. Radziner earned his Bachelor of Science in Architecture at Cal Poly in 1984 and his Master of Architecture at the University of Colorado in 1986.

== Career ==
After graduating from the University of Colorado, Radziner worked at various architectural firms in Los Angeles. With Leo Marmol in 1989, he established the architectural design firm, Marmol Radziner and Associates, in the Venice neighborhood of Los Angeles. Early on, Radziner and Marmol worked on small projects including a restaurant, some home additions, and an apartment. In 2007, both Marmol and Radziner were elevated to the College of the Fellows of the American Institute of Architects, and in 2009, Interior Design inducted them into the magazine's Hall of Fame.

By 2014, Radziner had worked on restoration projects originally designed by architects like Cliff May, John Lautner, and E. Stewart Williams (notably, the Santa Fe Federal Savings and Loan building in Palm Springs). The firm also completed the restoration of Neutra's Kronish House in Beverly Hills that year. Over the course of his career, Radziner had helped design homes for clients like Tom Ford, Demi Moore, Bradley Cooper, and Ellen DeGeneres among others.
