= Vince (brand) =

American clothing brand

- Type: Public
- Traded as: NASDAQ; VNCE
- Founded: 2002
- Headquarters: New York City
- Key people: Brendan Hoffman; Jill Norton; Yuji Okumura; Akiko Okuma; Caroline Belhumeur; Marie Fogel
- Products: Apparel, Footwear, Accessories
- Website: www.vince.com

Vince is a contemporary clothing and global luxury fashion brand founded in 2002. Vince offers women's and men's ready-to-wear, footwear, and accessories through brick-and-mortar retail stores (including outlets), vince.com, as well as through premium wholesale channels globally.

In 2023, Authentic Brands Group purchased its intellectual property in a $76.5 million deal.

== History ==
Vince was founded in 2002 by Rea Laccone and Christopher LaPolice.

In September 2006, Vince was sold to Kellwood Company.

In the fall of 2007, Vince introduced a menswear collection.

In spring 2008, Vince opened its first retail store on Robertson Blvd. in Los Angeles. That same month Vince launched its online store. Retail locations in New York City and Melrose Place followed shortly.

In July 2013, Vince filed with the SEC, an IPO worth up to $200 million.

November 22, 2013, Vince began trading under the ticker VNCE on the NYSE. In October 2025, Vince transferred its stock listing to NASDAQ to align with other high-growth companies.

Caroline Belhumeur joined Vince in May 2017 as Senior Vice President, Creative Director. In 2021, she was promoted to Chief Creative Officer and currently leads all aspects of creative for the brand, from women's and men's apparel to footwear and accessories, as well as brand, store, and collaboration direction.

Brendan Hoffman first joined Vince as Chief Executive Officer in 2015 before leaving the organization in September 2020. Mr. Hoffman rejoined Vince as CEO in February 2025. Since Mr. Hoffman's return to the business, Vince has seen strong financial results.

In August 2026, Vince Holding Corp. acquired the operating business of October's Very Own (OVO). OVO is the Canadian lifestyle brand founded by Drake, Oliver El-Khatib, and Noah “40” Shebib. OVO offers premium apparel and accessories and is known for its distinctive owl logo and black-and-gold aesthetic. The brand has grown into a globally recognized enterprise with 12 flagship stores and a worldwide e-commerce presence.
